= White Mountain art =

19th-century art depicting New Hampshire, US

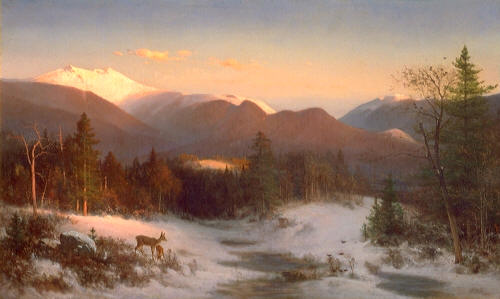
Thomas Hill (1829–1908) Mount Lafayette in Winter 1870

White Mountain art is the body of work created during the 19th century by over four hundred artists who painted landscape scenes of the White Mountains of New Hampshire in order to promote the region and, consequently, sell their works of art.

In the early part of the 19th century, artists ventured to the White Mountains of New Hampshire to sketch and paint. Many of the first artists were attracted to the region because of the 1826 tragedy of the Willey family, in which nine people lost their lives in a mudslide. These early works portrayed a dramatic and untamed mountain wilderness. Dr. Robert McGrath describes a Thomas Cole (1801–1848) painting titled Distant View of the Slide that Destroyed the Willey Family thus: "... an array of broken stumps and errant rocks, together with a gathering storm, suggest the wildness of the site while evoking an appropriate ambient of darkness and desolation". The images stirred the imagination of Americans, primarily from the large cities of the Northeast, who traveled to the White Mountains to view the scenes for themselves. Others soon followed: innkeepers, writers, scientists, and more artists. The White Mountains became a major attraction for tourists from the New England states and beyond. The circulation of paintings and prints depicting the area enabled those who could not visit, because of lack of means, distance, or other circumstance, to appreciate its beauty.

Transportation improved to the region; inns and later grand resort hotels, complete with artists in residence, were built. Benjamin Champney (1817–1907), one of the early artists, popularized the Conway Valley. Other artists preferred the Franconia area, and yet still others ventured to Gorham, Shelburne and the communities of the north. Although these artists all painted similar scenes within the White Mountains, each artist had an individual style that characterized his work. These landscape paintings in the Hudson River tradition, however, eventually fell out of favor with the public, and, by the turn of the century, the era for White Mountain art had ended.

== The Willey tragedy ==
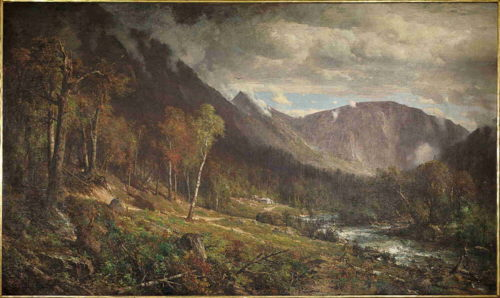
Thomas Hill (1829–1908) Crawford Notch 1872 Collection of the New Hampshire Historical Society

On August 28, 1826, torrential rains in the White Mountains caused a mudslide on Mount Willey. The Willey couple, with their five children, lived in a small house in Crawford Notch, a pass through the White Mountains between Mounts Willey and Webster. They evacuated their home with the help of two hired men to escape the landslide, but all seven Willeys and the two hired men died in the avalanche. The Willey home was left standing. Rescuers later found an open Bible on a table in the home, indicating that the family retreated in haste.

The news of the Willey tragedy quickly spread across the nation. During the ensuing years, it would become the subject of literature, drawings, local histories, scientific journals, and paintings. One such example is the painting by Thomas Hill (1829–1908) titled Crawford Notch, the site of the Willey tragedy before the slide. The Willey disaster started a new awareness of the American landscape and the raw wilderness of the White Mountains.

This allure — tragedy and untamed nature — was a powerful draw for the early artists who painted in the White Mountains of New Hampshire. Thomas Cole (1801–1848) in his diary entry of October 6, 1828, wrote, "The site of the Willey House, with its little patch of green in the gloomy desolation, very naturally recalled to mind the horrors of the night when the whole family perished beneath an avalanche of rocks and earth."

The incident provided the basis for an 1835 story by Nathaniel Hawthorne titled "The Ambitious Guest".

== Early artists ==
In 1827, one of the first artists to sketch in the White Mountains was Thomas Cole, founder of the style of painting that would later be called the Hudson River School. Cole's 1839 work, A View of the Pass Called the Notch of the White Mountains, is perhaps the best and finest example of early 19th-century White Mountain art. Catherine Campbell, in her reference New Hampshire Scenery, stated, "The Notch of the White Mountains [is a] magistral work, one of the undisputed masterpieces of White Mountain painting." Two other early White Mountain painters were the Massachusetts artists Alvan Fisher (1792–1863) and Thomas Doughty (1793–1856). The works of these early artists depicted dramatic landscapes and man's relative insignificance compared to nature. "Fisher's turbulent view [of The Notch] also emphasizes the power of the mountains and the fragility of human enterprise." These paintings helped to promote the region at a time when the White Mountains were an unknown wilderness.

Beginning in the 1830s, the landscape painters of the Hudson River School "sought to define America and what it was to be an American. Artists of that time saw themselves as scientists making documents that expressed Christian truths and democratic ideals."

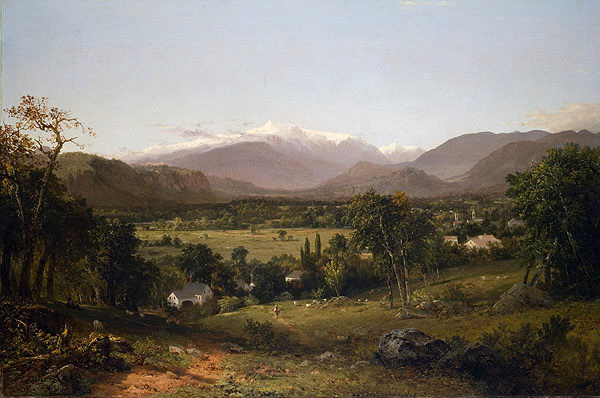
John Frederick Kensett (1816–1872) Mount Washington from the Valley of Conway

In 1851, John Frederick Kensett (1816–1872) produced a large canvas, 40 by 60 inches (1.0 m × 1.5 m), of Mount Washington that has become one of the best and finest later examples of White Mountain art. Barbara J. MacAdam, the Jonathan L. Cohen Curator of America Art at the Hood Museum of Dartmouth College, has written: "John Frederick Kensett first made the scene famous through his monumental landscape, Mount Washington from the Valley of Conway ... Kensett's image became the single most effective mid-nineteenth-century advertisement for the scenic charms of the White Mountains and of North Conway in particular. Mount Washington from the Valley of Conway, purchased by the American Art Union, was made into a print by the engraver James Smillie (1833–1909) and distributed to over 13,000 Art Union subscribers throughout the country. Many artists painted copies of this same scene from the print, and Currier and Ives published a lithograph of this view in 1860. Kensett's painting is another example of a work of art that helped to popularize the region. Catherine Campbell described the painting as "canonical among White Mountain paintings" and "the best known landscape view of the era."

Because of the proximity of Boston to the White Mountains, artists from that city became the predominant visitors and artists to capture White Mountain views. Beginning with Benjamin Champney in 1838, and continuing through the 19th century, his friends and fellow artists traveled to the mountains. In 1854 these artists, including Francis Seth Frost (1825–1902), Alfred T. Ordway (1821–1897), Samuel Lancaster Gerry (1813–1891), and Samuel W. Griggs (1827–1898), were the founding members of the Boston Art Club, which for many years became a venue to view White Mountain paintings.

== Travel to the region ==
Early coach travel to the White Mountains was time-consuming. Before the advent of rail travel, a stagecoach ride from Portland, Maine, to Conway, New Hampshire, a distance of 50 miles (80 km), took a day. When the St. Lawrence and Atlantic Railroad completed its route from Portland to Gorham in 1851, tourists and artists could travel in relative comfort to the White Mountains, and were within 8 miles (13 km) of Mount Washington and the Glen House.

Although rail lines to North Conway were not complete until the early 1870s, an innkeeper in the area, Samuel Thompson, established coach service from Conway to North Conway and, subsequently, to Pinkham Notch. Thompson is also credited with enticing artists to North Conway in order to promote the region. In the early 1850s, Thompson convinced a young artist, Benjamin Champney, to visit North Conway.

== Benjamin Champney and the allure of North Conway ==
Benjamin Champney at the age of 17

Benjamin Champney, a New Hampshire native, made his first trip to the White Mountains in 1838 on a summer excursion. As an emerging artist in the second half of the 19th century, Champney's style was influenced by the Hudson River School, yet he developed a unique style of his own. Dr. Donald D. Keyes has stated, "Champney witnessed major artistic changes; yet his art remained solidly in the camp of the Romantic artists of his youth."

In 1853, Champney bought a home in North Conway and spent the rest of his life painting in the greater Conway area. He attracted other artists to the region and opened his studio to them as well as to tourists. Champney, in his autobiography of 1900, wrote: "My studio has been the resort of many highly cultivated people from all parts of our country and even from foreign lands, and I have enjoyed much and learned much from the interchange of ideas with refined and intelligent minds." He also described the popularity of North Conway: "Thus every year brought fresh visitors to North Conway as the news of its attractions spread, until in 1853 and 1854 the meadows and the banks of the Saco were dotted all about with white umbrellas in great numbers."

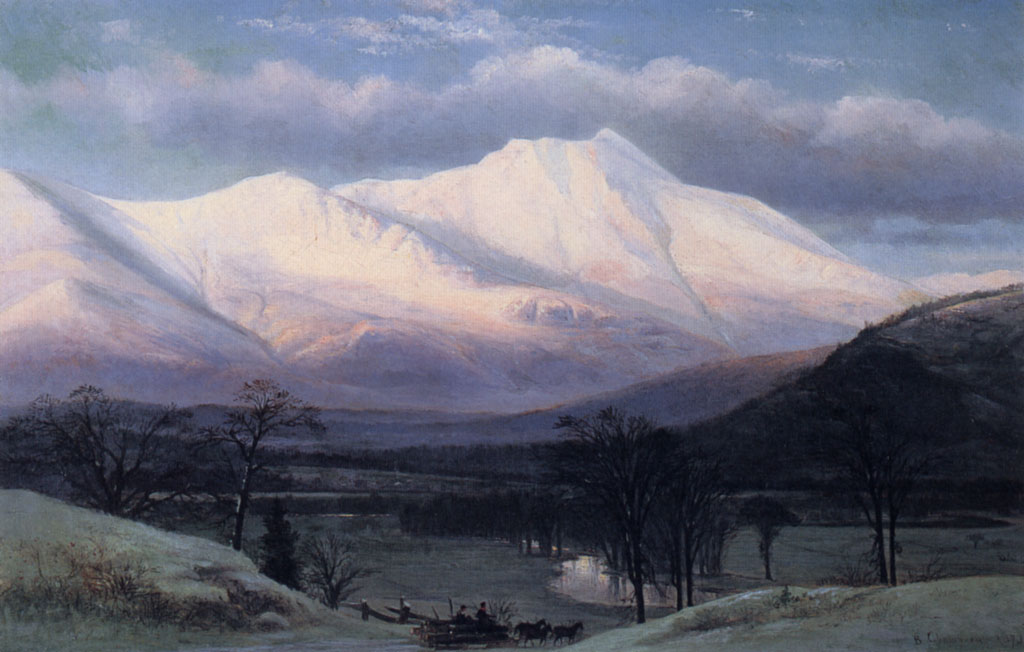
Benjamin Champney (1817–1907) Moat Mountain from North Conway

Largely because of Champney's promotion of the area, these artists traveled to North Conway in the summer to paint. The area was filled with artists painting en plein air. By 1855, North Conway had become " … the pet valley of our landscape painters. There are always a dozen or more here during the sketching season, and you can hardly glance over the meadows, in any direction, without seeing one of their white umbrellas shining in the sun," thus echoing Champney's own words. By the 1850s, North Conway had arguably become the first artist colony in the United States. Winslow Homer (1836–1910) depicted these artists in his 1868 painting titled Artists Sketching in the White Mountains.

== Later artists ==
In all, over four hundred artists are known to have painted White Mountain views during the 19th century. They came from the Boston area, Maine, Pennsylvania, and New York. Most of the Hudson River School painters worked in the White Mountains while maintaining studios in New York City, including such well-known artists as Sanford Robinson Gifford (1823–1880) and Jasper Francis Cropsey (1823–1900).

Most artists came to the White Mountains in the summer, but returned to their urban studios, or sometimes to warmer climates like Florida, in the winter. Therefore, paintings of winter scenes are not common. A few artists, like Champney, Edward Hill (1843–1923), and Edward's brother, Thomas Hill, sometimes painted these rarer winter scenes. Two examples of winter paintings, both illustrated in this article, are Thomas Hill's Mount Lafayette in Winter and Benjamin Champney's Moat Mountain from North Conway. Frank Henry Shapleigh (1842–1906) had a home in Jackson and was a prolific painter of New Hampshire scenes, both in summer and winter.

George Albert Frost(1843–1907) Franconia Notch (left); Franconia Notch in 2004 (right)

By mid-century, the later painters changed their style from the idealized views of the earlier painters to more literal views of the mountains. Dr. Donald D. Keyes has written, " ... the aesthetics of the time [1840s and 1850s] were also changing, with less emphasis placed on the Sublime and more on fact — 'realism'." These more literal views were sought after by tourists as mementos of their travels in an era before photography. As an example of how literal these depictions were, see the composite image where a painting by George Albert Frost (1843–1907) of Franconia Notch painted in 1883 is compared to a photograph of the scene in 2004.

== Grand resort hotels ==
It was during the 1860s that many of the region's resort hotels were built and became popular as major summer destinations for affluent city dwellers from Boston, New York, and Philadelphia. By 1865, White Mountain tourism was "so immense that it tasks to the utmost the capacity of all the hotels and boarding houses". During the latter half of the 19th century, many of the artists took up residence at one of these grand hotels and became known as artists-in-residence. This arrangement had advantages for both the artist and the hotel. Once established, the artists invited guests to their studios to view their works. The guests purchased original works to bring home as a remembrance of the White Mountains. The hotel benefited by having another attraction to keep guests for an extended stay.

Two well-known artists-in-residence were Edward Hill and Frank Henry Shapleigh. Hill worked at the Profile House in Franconia Notch for fifteen years, from 1877 to 1892, and spent shorter stays at the Waumbek Hotel and the Glen House. Frank Shapleigh was the artist-in-residence at the Crawford House in Crawford Notch for sixteen years, from 1877 to 1893.

== Working in North Conway, Franconia, and points north ==
Horace Wolcott Robbins (1842–1904) The Northern Presidentials

North Conway, by virtue of its unique location in the southern Mount Washington Valley, was a gathering place for many of the artists. The artist Asher B. Durand (1796–1886), in a letter to The Crayon in 1855, described the appeal of North Conway:

Mount Washington, the leading feature of the scene, ... rises in all his majesty, and with his contemporary patriots, Adams, Jefferson, Munroe [sic], bounds the view at the North. On either hand, subordinate mountains and ledges slope, or abruptly descend to the fertile plain that borders the Saco, stretching many miles southward, rich in varying tints of green fields and meadows, and beautifully interspersed with groves and scattered trees of graceful form and deepest verdure ... where every possible shade of green is harmoniously mingled.

A favorite spot in North Conway for viewing and painting Mount Washington was Sunset Hill. Typical for this view, in 1858 Champney painted Mount Washington from Sunset Hill that looks down on his own house and backyard, and out across North Conway's Intervale. North Conway afforded vantage points for other frequently painted views — Moat Mountain, Kearsarge North, and Mount Chocorua. North Conway was also a short distance from two of the three notches of the White Mountains: Pinkham Notch, and Crawford Notch.

Many artists also traveled to the third notch, Franconia Notch, to paint. A rivalry developed between the Franconia artists and the North Conway artists. Each faction believed that their location had the most beautiful view of the mountains. Those who preferred Franconia felt that North Conway, as early as 1857, had been overrun by tourists. Barbara J. MacAdam, in her essay "A Proper Distance from the Hills", stated: "To meet this growing demand [for tourists], railroad lines were extended and new hotels constructed on a grand scale. In the process, those qualities that had drawn artists to North Conway in the first place became endangered." Daniel Huntington (1816–1906), writing from West Campton in 1855, described the appeal of the Franconia region to the landscape painter.

I find it indeed a very agreeable and desirable place for landscape study ... The Pemigewasset river which winds through the valley, is somewhat like the Saco in the vicinity of Conway. Its banks are mostly of sand, occasionally varied by broken masses of rock ... The valley is narrower than that of the Saco, and is quite different in the character of its half-wooded hill-sides.

In the Franconia region, artists painted Mount Lafayette, Franconia Notch, Eagle Cliff, and New Hampshire's well-known icon, the Old Man of the Mountain. Edward Hill, George McConnell, and Samuel Lancaster Gerry all painted the subject of the Old Man. Fewer artists worked in the area north of the Presidential Range. Those who did painted less well-known scenes from Shelburne, Gorham, and Jefferson. These locations were strategically located along train or coach routes from Gorham and Franconia. The Northern Presidentials, pictured above, is one such example of a painting of the Presidential Range from the north.

== Characteristics of the artists ==
Each White Mountain artist had certain characteristics that would distinguish his work from that of other artists. These characteristics may be more suggestive of an artist than even his signature, since signatures are sometimes forged.

Benjamin Champney was a master at painting water and is known for warm autumn colors. William F. Paskell (1866–1951), in his later style, used broad brushstrokes and bright colors to create an impressionistic feeling. George McConnell (1852–1929) was known for the velvety pastel look of his paintings. Edward Hill often created a canopy-like depiction of trees to frame and accentuate the focus of a painting, a technique that gave many of his works a feeling of intimacy and solitude. Many of the works of Samuel Lancaster Gerry (1813–1891) included dogs, people on horseback, and women and men in red clothing. Francis Seth Frost (1825–1902) was known to use small figures, wispy clouds, and an oval format. Alfred Thompson Bricher (1837–1908) was known for his quiet, calm water. Sylvester Phelps Hodgdon (1830–1906) painted at the extremes of the day – sunrise and sunset scenes – and often in Franconia Notch. John White Allen Scott (1815–1907) frequently painted passing storm clouds in his skies. Frank Henry Shapleigh had his own primitive style and used the same "props" over and over again in his paintings. He is known for painting landscapes as seen from the inside of a house or barn looking out through an open door or window. Inside the room would be such props as a ladder back chair, a cat, a basket, a straw hat, a broom, and/or a tall clock.

Characteristics are illustrated for these representative artists in the image gallery below.

== End of an era ==
The scenes these artists painted became American icons, certainly to the people of New England. As tourists took these White Mountain paintings home, they were widely dispensed throughout the country. Today, these paintings are discovered as far away as California.

By the latter part of the 19th century, landscape images, such as Mount Washington, had lost their appeal with the public. Newer images, such as those of the Rocky Mountains, were outweighing interest in the White Mountains. Also, landscapes in the Hudson River style were "usurped both by new artistic ideas and by the social and technological changes that were rapidly occurring in the region and throughout the country." By the end of the 19th century, these factors, and the advent of photography, led to the gradual decline of White Mountain landscape painting. Many of these paintings, however, are preserved in both private collections and public institutions. Some of these paintings can be seen in New Hampshire at the New Hampshire Historical Society in Concord, the Currier Museum of Art in Manchester, and at the Hood Museum of Art in Hanover. In Massachusetts, the Woburn Public Library has a number of paintings by Benjamin Champney on display.

== Gallery: Characteristics of the artists ==
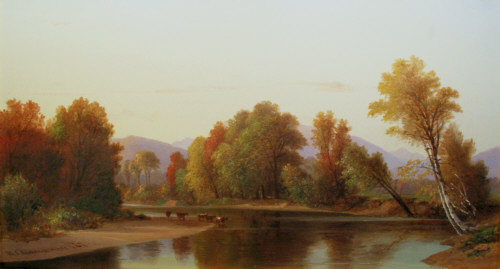
Benjamin Champney (1817–1907)
Autumn on the Saco River
Master at water; warm autumn colors

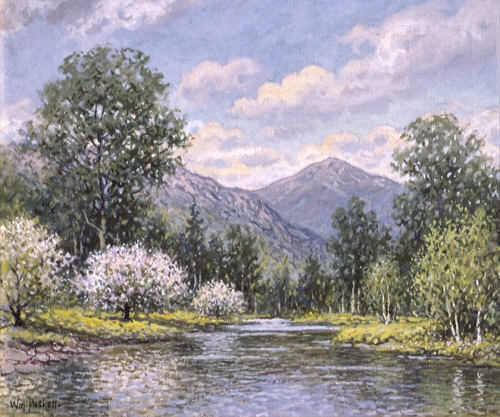
William F. Paskell (1866–1951)
Mount Kearsarge in Spring
Bright colors; impressionistic feeling

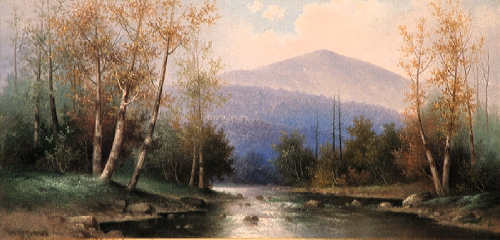
George McConnell (1852–1929)
Mount Washington
Velvety pastel look

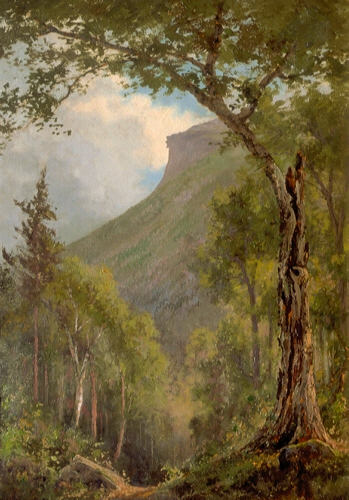
Edward Hill (1843–1923)
Old Man of the Mountain
Canopy of trees frames the scene.

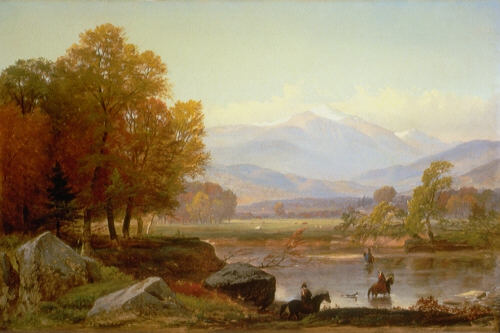
Samuel Lancaster Gerry (1813–1891)
Mount Washington
Dogs; people on horseback.

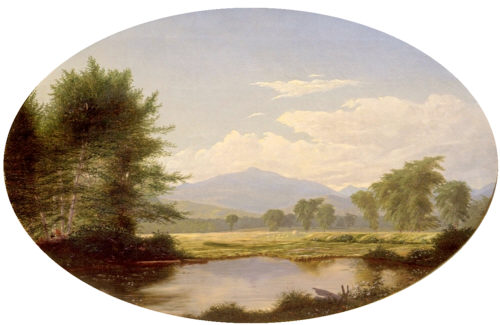
Francis Seth Frost (1825–1902)
Mount Washington
Small figures, wispy clouds, oval format

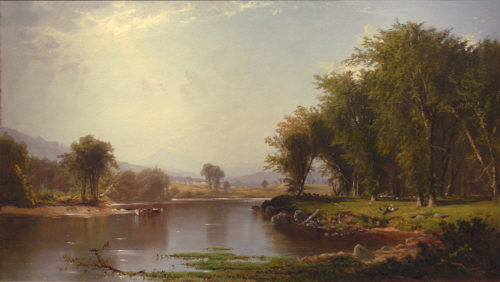
Alfred Thompson Bricher (1837–1908)
Summer on the Saco
Quiet, calm water

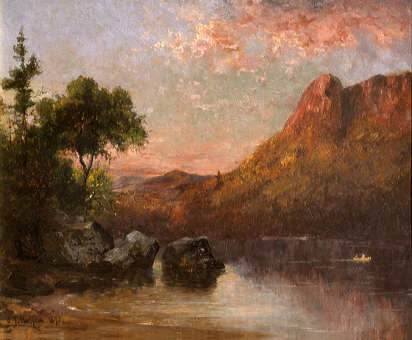
Sylvester Phelps Hodgdon (1830–1906)
Profile Lake, Evening
Extremes of the day

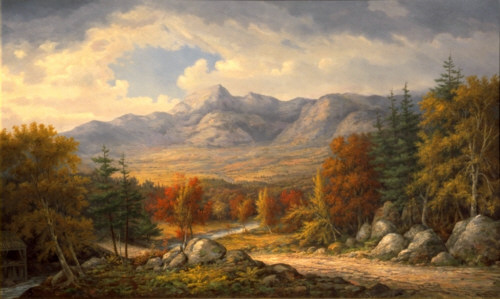
John White Allen Scott (1815–1907)
Mount Chocorua
Storm clouds in both corners of the sky

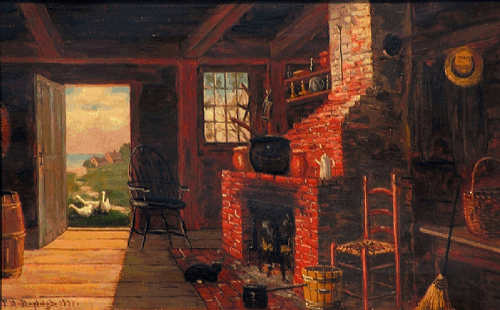
Frank Henry Shapleigh (1842–1906)
Old Kitchen
Ladder back chair, cat, basket, straw hat, broom

== Notable White Mountain artists ==
- Albert Bierstadt
- Alfred Thompson Bricher
- George Loring Brown
- Harrison Bird Brown
- Benjamin Champney
- Thomas Cole
- Jasper Francis Cropsey
- Ann Sophia Towne Darrah
- Thomas Doughty
- Asher B. Durand
- Alvan Fisher
- Francis Seth Frost
- George Albert Frost
- Samuel Lancaster Gerry
- Sanford Robinson Gifford
- William Hart
- Edward Hill
- Thomas Hill
- Winslow Homer
- Sylvester Phelps Hodgdon
- George Inness
- David Johnson
- John Frederick Kensett
- Edmund Darch Lewis
- Alfred T. Ordway
- William Trost Richards
- Horace Wolcott Robbins
- John White Allen Scott
- Frank Henry Shapleigh
- Aaron Draper Shattuck
- William Louis Sonntag
- Wesley Webber

== See also ==
- Landscape art
- New Hampshire Historical Marker No. 38: White Mountain School of Art
