= Studio Building (Boston, Massachusetts) =

Coordinates: 42°21′25.99″N 71°3′40.05″W

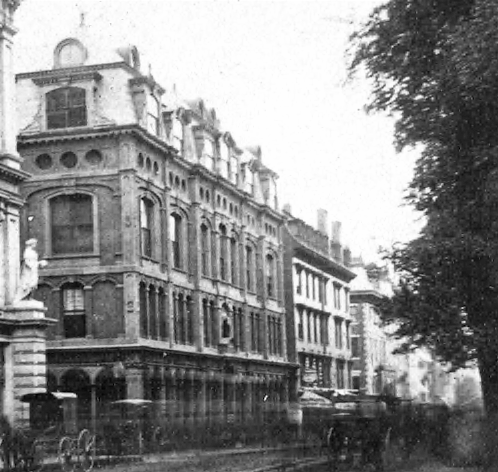
Studio Building, no.110 Tremont St., Boston, 19th century

The Studio Building (1861–1906) on Tremont Street (corner of Bromfield Street) in Boston, Massachusetts, housed artists' studios, theater companies and other businesses in the 19th century. It "held the true Bohemia of Boston, where artists and literati delighted to gather." Among the tenants were portraitist E.T. Billings, architect George Snell, sculptor Martin Milmore, artists William Morris Hunt, William Rimmer, Edward Mitchell Bannister, Phoebe Jenks; gallerist Seth Morton Vose, and many others.

Jonas Gilman Clark was an owner of the building from 1864 to 1872.

== History ==
=== Artists' studios ===
From 1861 the Studio Building stood adjacent to the Horticultural Hall, on the opposite side of Bromfield St. The building consisted of "a massive range of brick, four stories high, — the whole surmounted by a French roof; a handsome and imposing structure, in the lower story of which are six fine large stores, occupied [in 1869] by the Leavitt and Parker Sewing-Machine Cos., California Wine Agency, the Howard Clock Co., &c.; and, above-stairs, by numerous artists, painters, engravers, draughtsmen, &c."

"The Studio Building ... is a perfect hive of artists. This building, indeed, is the headquarters of the artists of Boston. ... There are delightful artists' receptions here, to which the general public is invited. Besides the devotees of art, there are many private teachers of music and the languages in the Studio Building, and not a few of the rooms are occupied as bachelors' apartments." Visitors included Sophia Peabody Hawthorne in 1863: "5 June, Thursday. Finest day - cool. We went out after breakfast with Annie. We visited Studio gallery - & saw good statue of Judge Shaw. Hunt's portrait by himself. Healy's Longfellow. Ames' Rachel. Gay's seashore & a pearly silvery sky of wondrous truth."

Beginning in November 1861, artist William Rimmer gave anatomy "lectures in Room 55 of the Studio Building. He was an inspiring teacher; John LaFarge ... Daniel Chester French, Frederick Vinton, Frank Benson and many others testified to it. ... He represented the first thorough art instruction based on the human figure to be given in Boston, and indeed in the entire United States. ... Rimmer's lectures were never mere dry analyses of muscles and their attachments. He drew brilliantly on the blackboard, combining technical diagrams with fantastic embellishments. His figures sprouted wings, were set off by elegant draperies, sat beside elaborate urns, were clad in fanciful armor, brandished trumpets and daggers." One of his students was May Alcott, who "studied sculpture with William Rimmer and painting with William Hunt at the new Studio Building in Boston, on the corner of Tremont and Broomfield streets."

The "studio and gallery" of William Morris Hunt "were the great attractions to visitors who came to the 'receptions' given by the artists in the building. The stirring picture, The Bugle Call, painted in Newport, was exhibited here; the drawing of The Drummer Boy, which attracted great crowds while on exhibition in Messrs. Williams & Everett's window, was conceived and executed here. Its motto, 'To arms! To arms!' found a response in the mood of the citizens, who were burning with patriotic ardor. I think this was just after the firing upon Fort Sumter, in 1861." According to one historian, however, Hunt himself probably found Boston "a far cry from the carefree vie de Boheme of Paris, and the life centering around the Studio Building on Tremont Street but a pale replica of the Latin Quarter -like a plaster cast, almost like a death mask, one might say, of the lively original."

=== Tremont Theatre ===
"The new Tremont Theatre, in the Studio Building, on Tremont street, was remodelled from Allston Hall, and opened as a theatre on Feb. 9, 1863, under the management of Mrs. Jane English, with a ballet and pantomime troupe. ... For a brief period K. L. Davenport and J. W. Wallack were managers of the house, but notwithstanding the high character of the dramatic work done here, it was not a prosperous theatre. It was finally converted into a hall for pedestrian matches, and [by 1892 was] used for a retail carpet-store."

Performances included:

- "Le Rue's great war show! The wonderful strato-pateticon, or walking-army"
- Theatre Francais, directed by Paul Juignet, 1864-1865
- Tom Taylor's The Ticket-of-Leave Man, 1865
- Holman Opera Troupe -Mr. George Holman, his wife, his daughter Sallie Holman (soprano/principal singer) and another daughter, and two sons, with some others, including William H. Crane and Sallie`s husband Mr. J. T. Dalton, which toured throughout Canada for many years.
- Morris Brothers, Pell & Trowbridge's Minstrels
- Cotton & Murphy Minstrels

=== Fire in 1906 ===
In December 1906 a fire "caused heavy damage in the block bounded by Tremont, Bromfield, Washington and Winter streets. ... The flames were confined ... to one structure, the Studio building."

== Images ==
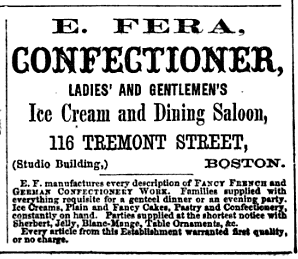
Advertisement for E. Fera's ice cream saloon, 1864

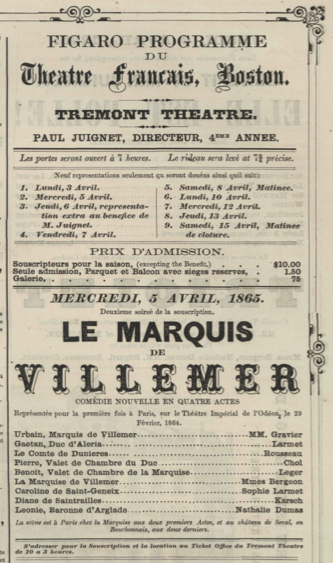
Detail of programme for Paul Juignet's Theatre Francais, 1865

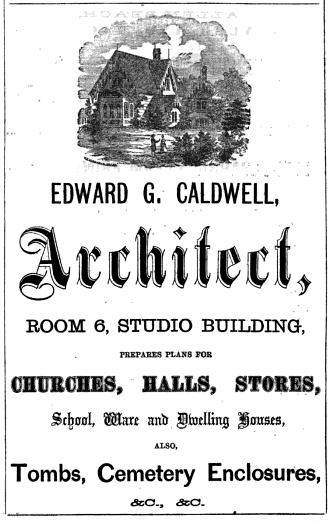
Advertisement for Edward G. Caldwell, architect, 1868

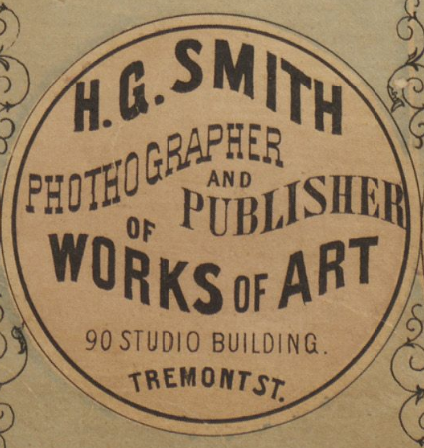
Advertisement for H.G. Smith, photographer, 1869

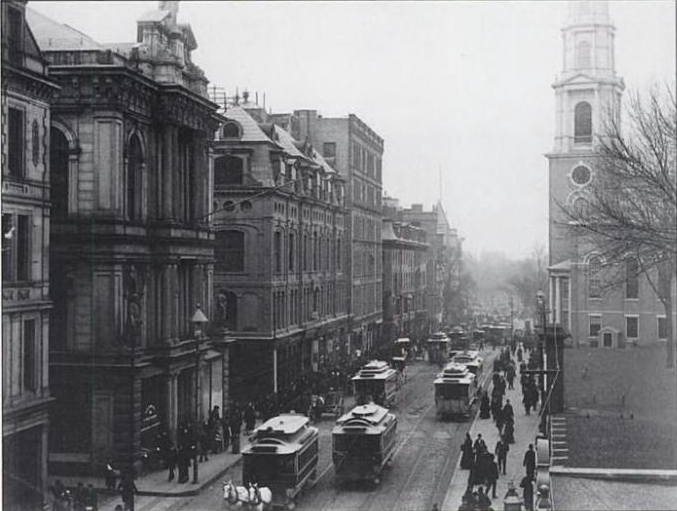
Tremont St., 1891, with view of Horticultural Hall, Studio Building (at left), Park St. Church, Granary Burying Ground (at right)

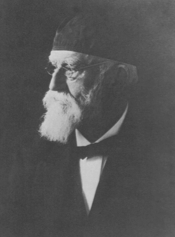
Portrait of Seth M. Vose, gallerist (photo 1900)

== Tenants ==
List of Tenants
- American Art Gallery
- Joseph Ames
- Miss M.K. Baker, artist
- E.M. Bannister, artist
- E.T. Billings, artist
- Edward Brackett
- Miss M.A. Bradford, artist
- Mrs. E.H. Brainard, artist
- Miss H.L. Brown, artist
- J. Appleton Brown, artist
- E.C. Cabot, architect
- Edward G. Caldwell, architect
- Miss E.M. Carpenter, artist
- William Carl, artist
- Miss A.E. Chandler, artist
- F. Myron Clark
- J.G. Cloudman, artist
- George A. Clough, architect
- Darius Cobb, artist
- Theodore E. Colburn, architect
- Henry Cook, artist
- Charles Copeland, artist
- J.C. Crossman, artist
- George L. Crosby, artist
- Cummings & Sears, architects
- Cyrus E. Dallin, artist
- Thomas W. Dewing, artist
- T.C. Doane
- John Donoghue, artist
- Morris Dorr, architect
- Grace Dow, artist
- Frank Duveneck, artist
- B.F. Dwight, architect
- Educational Committee for Freedmen
- L.D. Eldred, artist
- William R. Emerson, architect
- Miss M.M. Emery, artist
- Fabronius, artist
- A.C. Fenety, artist
- F.M. Fenety, artist
- Beatrice V. Folsom, artist
- Bradford Freeman, artist
- Francis Seth Frost
- Edmund H. Garrett, artist
- Ignaz Gaugengigl, artist
- S.L. Gerry
- Ellen L. Gilbert, artist, educator
- James Gilbert, artist
- Abbott Graves
- James R. Gregerson, architect
- S.W. Griggs, artist
- Louis K. Harlow, artist
- George F. Higgins, artist
- S.P. Hodgdon, artist
- Mrs. Horton, artist
- William Morris Hunt
- Phoebe A. Jenks, artist
- N.T. Johnson, artist
- D.C. Johnston and T.M.J. Johnston, artists
- Earnest Kuhn, artist
- Walter F. Lansil, artist
- A.W. Latham, artist
- Edmonia Lewis
- L.K. Long, artist
- W.P.P. Longfellow, architect
- G.A. Loring, artist
- Miss E.P. Mann, artist
- Marshall & Co., photographs
- Mrs. M.C. McGurk, artist
- H.W. Merrill, artist
- Samuel S. Miles, artist
- Martin Millmore, sculptor
- B.R. Morse, artist
- George C. Munzig, artist
- P. Nefflen, artist
- New England Loyal Publication Society (related to the Loyal Publication Society
- Jessie Noa, artist
- F. Evelyn Nute, artist
- Alfred Ordway, artist
- H. Winthrop Peirce, artist
- S.E. Perkins, artist
- Miss M.A. Platt, artist
- B.C. Porter, artist
- C.W. Reed, artist
- Miss H. Reed, artist
- Mrs. E.S. Remick, artist
- J.F. Reynolds
- William Rimmer, sculptor
- Thomas Robinson, artist
- S.W. Rowse, artist
- L.A. Schirmer, artist
- G.W. Seavey, artist
- Frank Henry Shapleigh, artist
- Anna H. Silloway, artist
- T.S. Slafter, artist
- H.G. Smith, photographer, publisher
- George Snell, architect
- Miss Southwick, artist
- Charles E. Stetfield, artist
- Miss S.C. Stetson, artist
- Frederick T. Stuart, artist, c. 1902
- Miss F.W. Tewskbury, artist
- Jerome Thompson, painter
- John D. Towle & Son, architects
- Henry Van Brunt and William Robert Ware, architects
- Herman Vogel, artist
- Seth Morton Vose, gallerist
- Lilian Walker, artist
- Florence I. Webber, artist
- George A. Weeden, artist
- Fred D. Williams, artist
- Joseph P. Woodbury, "inventor"
- Elizabeth Wyer, artist
