= Francis Frost =

Francis Frost may refer to:

- Francis Theodore Frost (1843–1916), Canadian manufacturer and politician
- Francis Seth Frost (1825–1902), painter, photographer and businessman

== See also ==
- Frank Frost (disambiguation)
