= Edward Hill (painter) =

American painter and writer

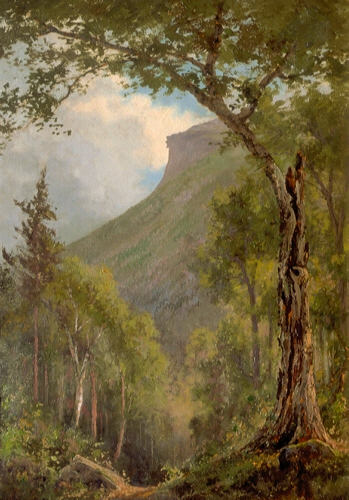
Edward Hill (1843-1923) Old Man of the Mountain

Edward Hill (December 9, 1843 – August 27, 1923) was a prolific artist as well as a published poet, songwriter, and newspaper correspondent. His paintings include White Mountain landscapes, southern genre scenes, still lifes, portraits, American Indians, European attractions, and the scenery of the American West.

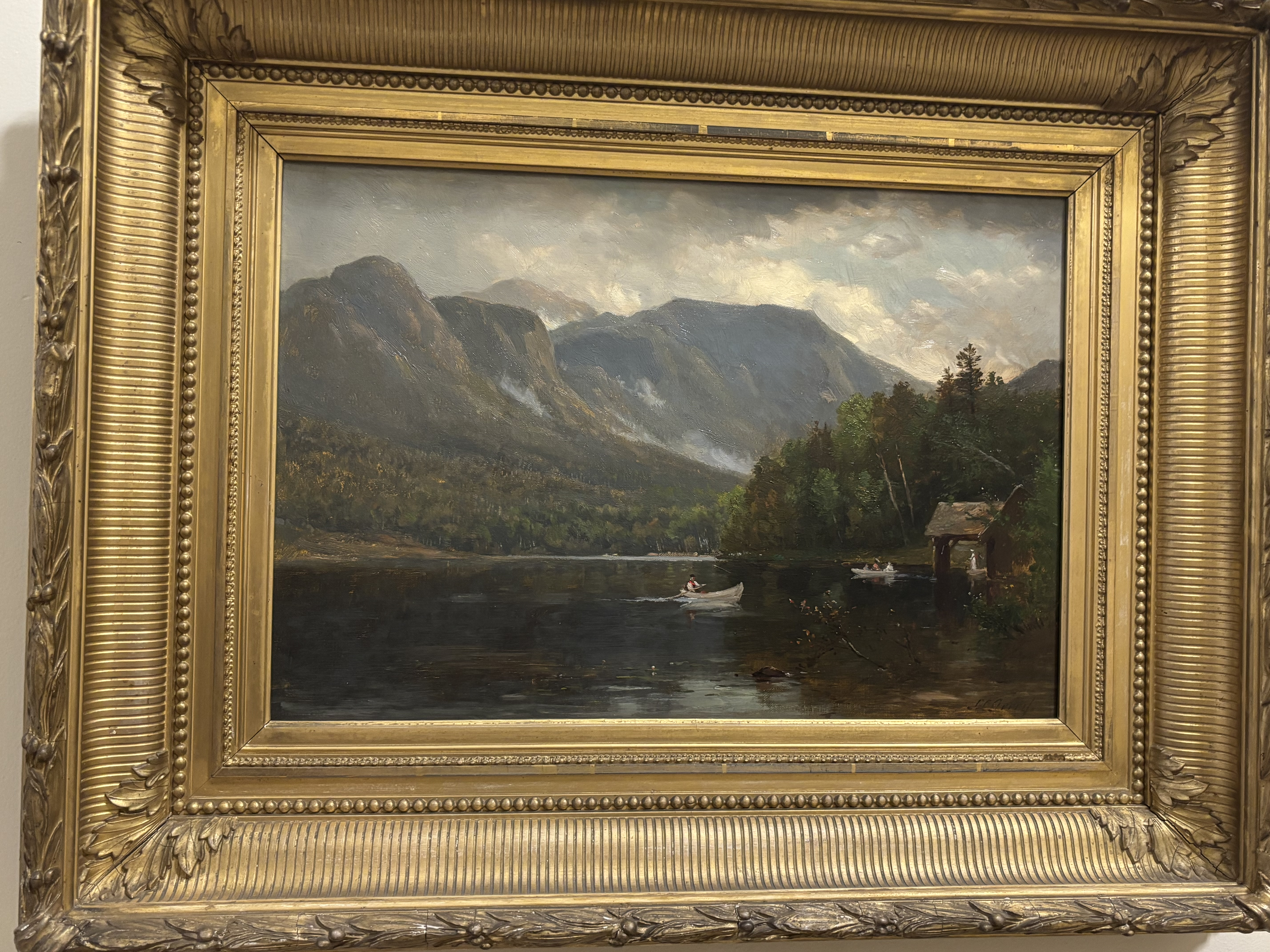
Presidential Range, painted by Edward Hill in 1886.

== Early life ==
Hill was born in the Union Poor House, Wolverhampton, Staffordshire, England on December 9, 1843. His family moved to the United States in 1844, settling in Taunton, Massachusetts. Moving frequently, the family finally settled in Gardner, Massachusetts in 1860. Edward and his brother, Thomas Hill, worked for Heywood Brothers & Company decorating furniture. Edward moved to San Francisco in 1862 where he shared a studio with Thomas who had settled there the previous year. By 1864, Edward returned to Boston and began painting in earnest.

== Artistic career ==
Hill married Sarah Lorla Brown in 1869 and moved to Littleton, New Hampshire the following year. In 1874, the family moved to Lancaster, New Hampshire. In 1875, while living in Lancaster, Hill painted The Presidential Range from Legro's Hill, Lancaster, one of his earliest known White Mountain pictures. From 1877 to 1892, Hill was artist-in-residence at the Profile House in Franconia Notch. The surrounding area provided subjects for his paintings that proved popular with the hotel guests - Profile Lake, the Old Man of the Mountain, Echo Lake, Eagle Cliff, The Flume, and Mount Lafayette.

Hill exhibited regularly at the Boston Art Club throughout the 1880s, where he was an artist member from 1881 to 1887. By this time, Hill's financial success and artistic acceptance were firmly established.

== Later years ==
Hill spent the last years of his life in the Pacific Northwest. At 67 years of age, Hill moved to Hood River, Oregon and opened a studio. His time had passed, however, and he could not find clients for his works. He died quietly on August 27, 1923 at the Cottage Hospital in Hood River. He was buried by the Hood River Masonic Lodge who were given Hill's paintings and studio effects towards payment of his hospital bills and burial expenses. He was buried in an unmarked grave at the Idlewilde Cemetery in Hood River. Sixty years after his death, a marker was placed on his gravesite through the generosity of Robert A. Goldberg, a well-known collector of White Mountain paintings. The marker reads, "EDWARD HILL, 1843 1923, ARTIST."
