= John W. A. Scott =

John White Allen Scott
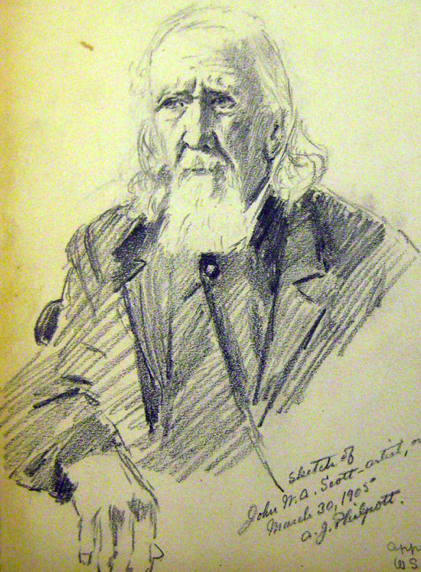
- Born: 1815; Roxbury, Massachusetts
- Died: March 4, 1907 (aged 91–92); Cambridge, Massachusetts
- Known for: painting, lithography

John White Allen Scott (1815- March 4, 1907) was an American painter and lithographer associated with the Hudson River School and White Mountain art.

== Biography ==
John White Allen Scott or John W.A. Scott was born in Roxbury, Boston, Massachusetts, in 1815. Scott began as an apprentice at Pendleton's Lithography in 1830 at the same time as fellow Roxbury native Nathaniel Currier of Currier and Ives. In 1844 Scott started a lithography firm in partnership with Fitz Hugh Lane ("Lane & Scott's Lithography"), which lasted until 1847. The firm successfully produced lithographs dominated by ships, landscapes and architectural forms. Scott continued to produce "exceptional" lithographs into the 1850s and would remain friends with Lane. Around 1852 he kept a studio in Boston's Tremont Temple. Scott's work sold well during his time; for instance, in 1855 he "sold more than 50 landscapes at auction." Among his favorite subjects was Southern New Hampshire's Mount Monadnock. He belonged to the New England Art Union and the Boston Art Club (1863-1907), of which he was the oldest member at the time of his death. Scott also frequently exhibited at the Boston Athenæum.

Scott's paintings are now held in the collections of the Museum of Fine Arts, Boston, the Currier Museum of Art, the Farnsworth Art Museum, the New Hampshire Historical Society, and The Butler Institute of American Art, among other museums and galleries.

== Image gallery ==
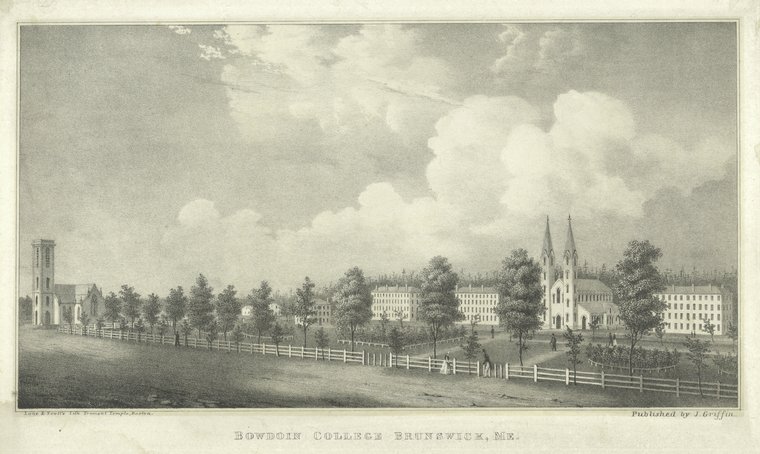
Lithograph by Lane & Scott of Bowdoin College, 1845

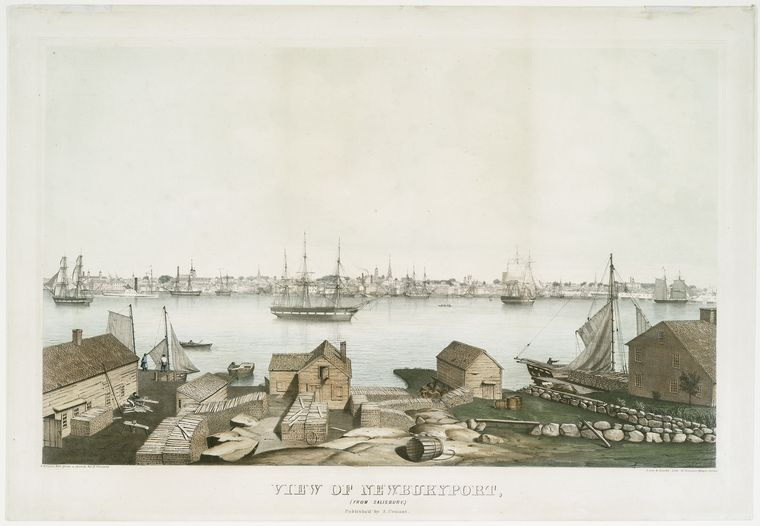
Lithograph by Lane & Scott of Newburyport, Massachusetts, 1846

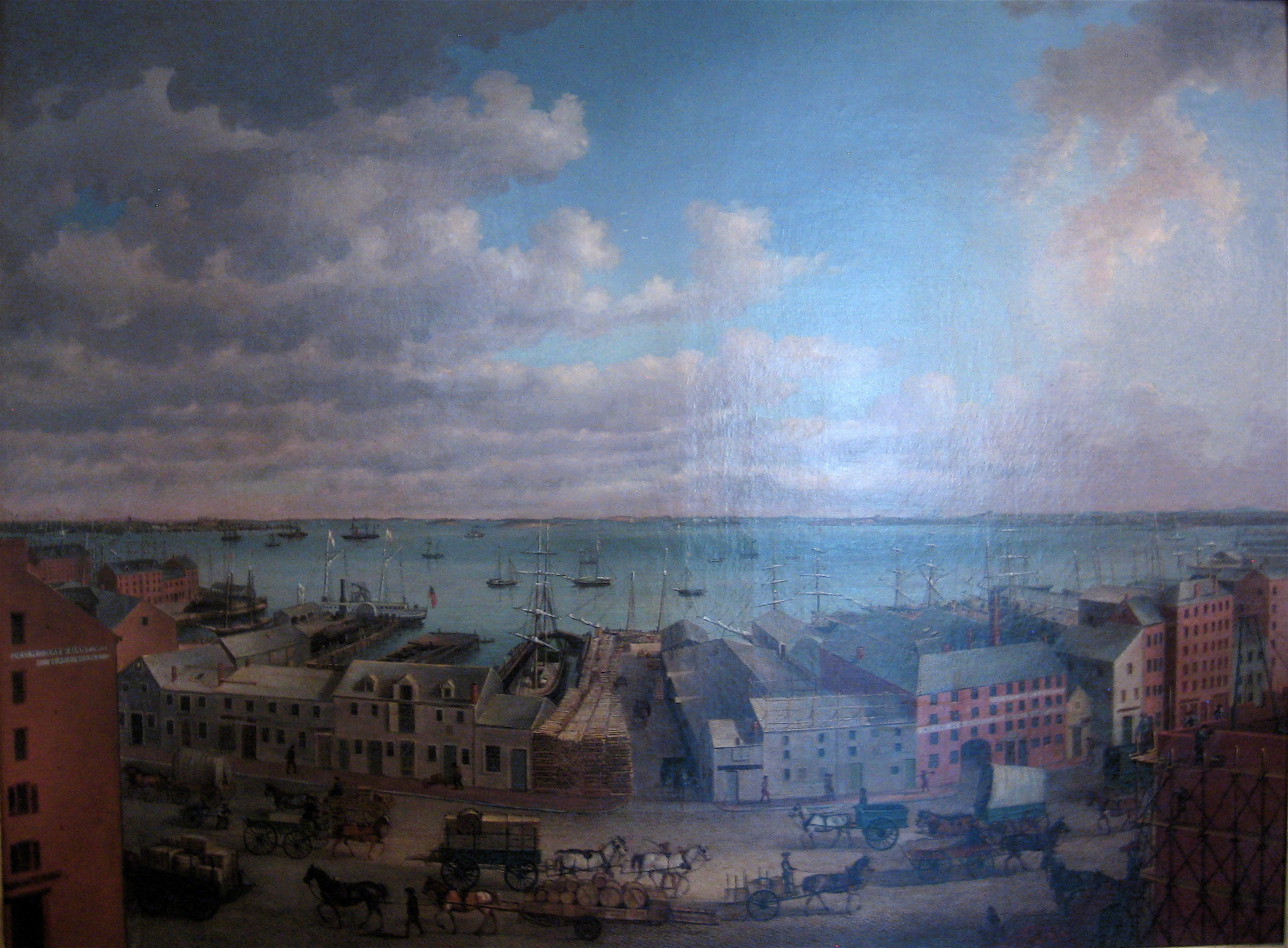
Boston Harbor, by John W.A. Scott, 1853 (Old State House Museum, Boston)

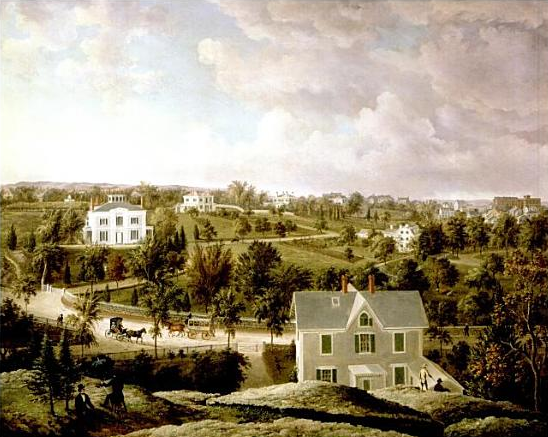
View of Roxbury by John W.A. Scott, 1854 (Museum of Fine Arts, Boston)
