= Frost & Adams =

Historical store in Boston, Massachusetts

Coordinates: 42°21′34.58″N 71°3′27.81″W

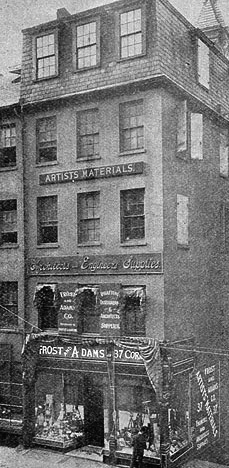
Frost & Adams, no.37 Cornhill, Boston, ca.1905

Frost & Adams (est.1869) was an artists' supply firm in Boston, Massachusetts, located in Cornhill, on the current site of Boston City Hall and City Hall Plaza. It began in 1869 when artist Francis Seth Frost and retailer E.H. Adams bought the business of Matthew J. Whipple. By the 1880s Frost & Adams were "the chief dealers in artists' materials in New England."

== History ==
Proprietors included F.S. Frost, E.H. Adams, H.A. Lawrence, Herbert C. Gardner, Joseph H. Peacock, and Edward J. White. The firm later moved to Arch Street (ca.1921).

In the 1880s the firm stocked "all the materials used by painters, engravers, etchers, repousse-workers, china-painters, crayon artists, water colorists, tapestry-painters, architects, engineers, and draughtsmen." They also carried "fancy articles for decorating, in bronze and brass, porcelain and china, Albenine and Barbotine ware, bisque vases and terraline ware, tambourines of sheepskin, calfskin, brass, and satin." "Five-sixths of the trade is wholesale, extending throughout New England, the Middle and Western States, and Canada, and kept in activity by travelling salesmen."

Some art world luminaries shopped at Frost & Adams. It was "the depot of supplies for Hunt, Inness, Neal, Brown, Enneking, Norton, Vinton, Picknell, Gaugengigl, Shapleigh, ... H.H. Richardson, Cabot & Chandler, Van Brunt & Howe, Peabody & Stearns."

Sometime after 1921, Frost & Adams was bought by the H.H. Sullivan Company, which itself was acquired by B.L. Makepeace Inc. in 1931. As of 2010, Makepeace operates from headquarters in Brighton, Massachusetts, and specializes in reprographics and survey equipment.

In 2019, the Frost & Adams brand was revived and refreshed by The Juna Group, LLC.

== Images ==
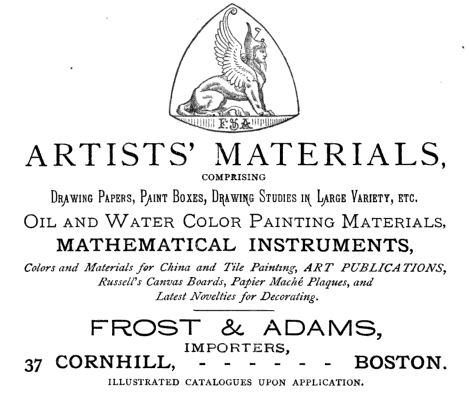
Advertisement, 1882

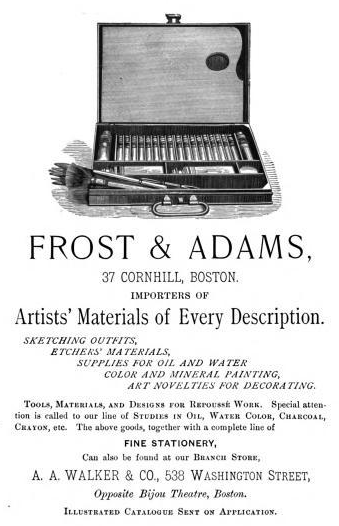
Advertisement for Frost & Adams; and branch store A.A. Walker & Co., opposite Bijou Theatre, Washington St., 1884

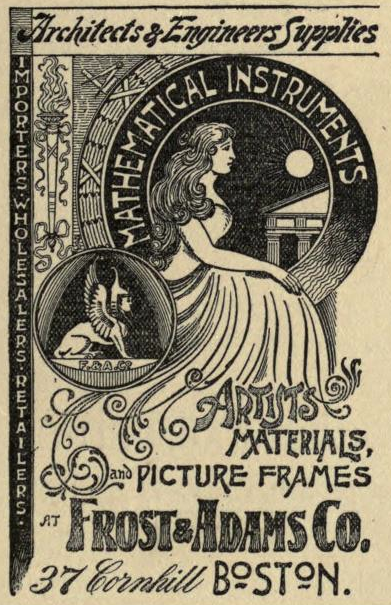
Advertisement, 1896

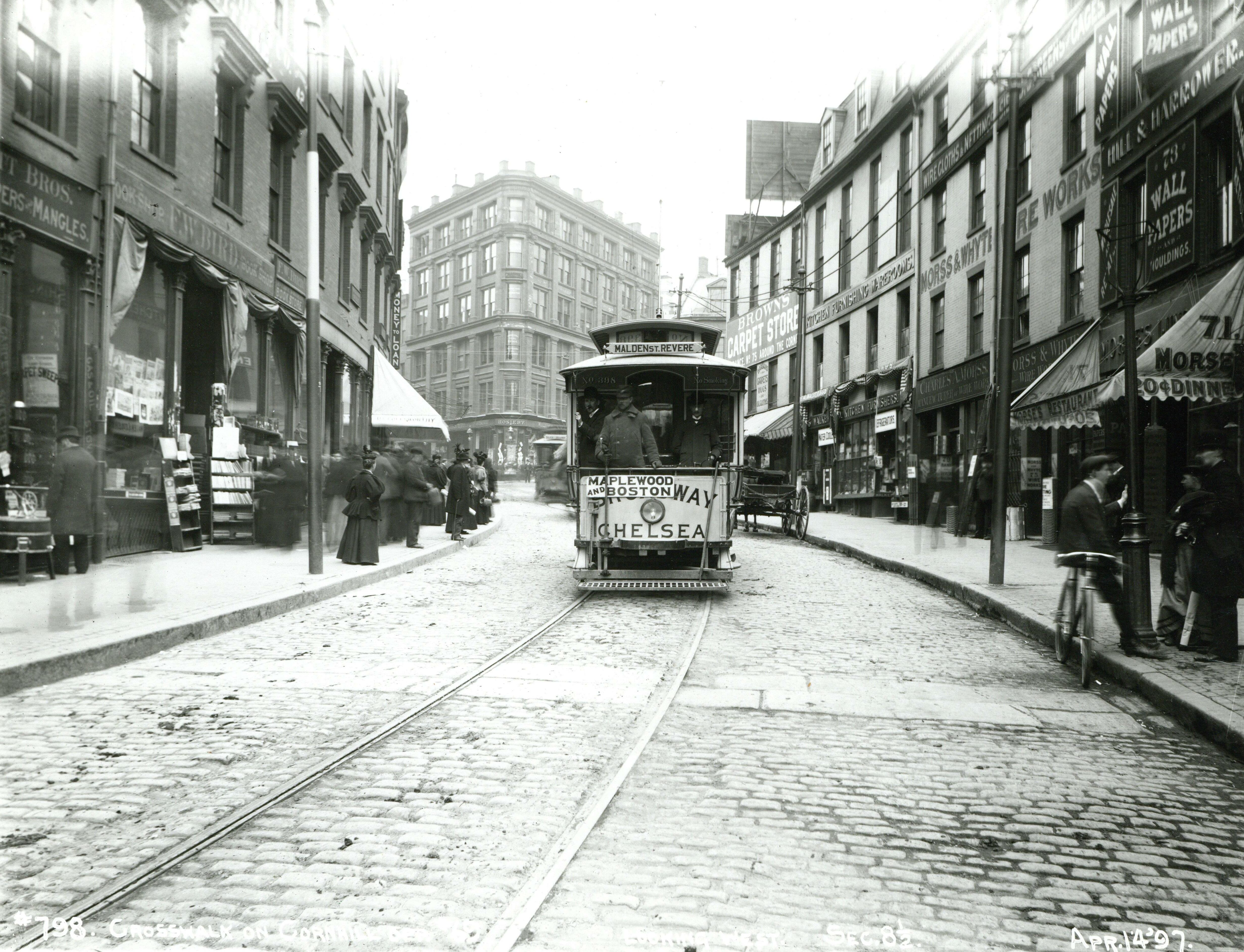
Cornhill, Boston, 1897

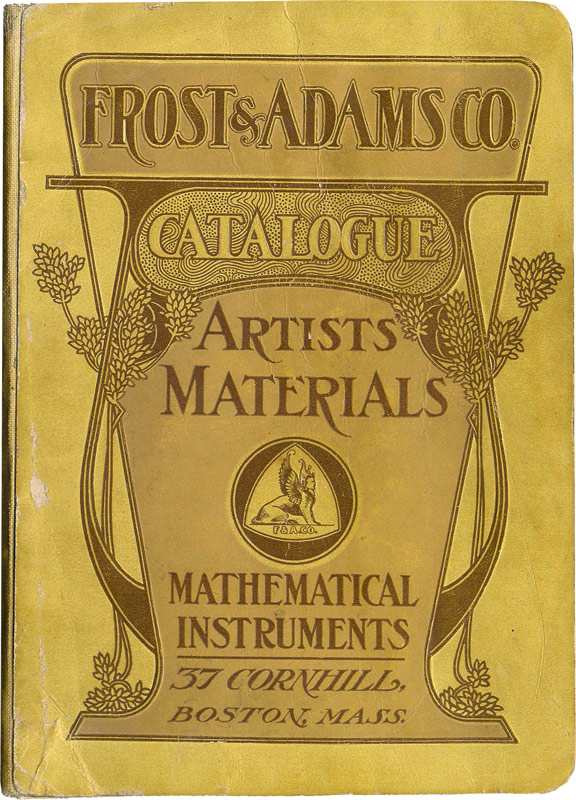
Catalog, 1905
