= George Albert Frost =

American painter (1843–1907)

- Born: 1843; Boston, Massachusetts
- Died: 1907 (aged 63–64); Cambridge, Massachusetts
- Movement: White Mountain art

George Albert Frost (December 23, 1843 – November 13, 1907) was an American artist of the 19th century. He was born in Boston, Massachusetts and had a studio in North Cambridge, Massachusetts for several years. He studied under Nicolas de Keyser at the Academy Royale de Belgique in Antwerp. His paintings were mostly landscapes, and he is considered a member of the White Mountain art group of painters.

== Career ==
Frost was born in Boston in 1843. He left school at age eleven to work on a farm where he had no opportunity to follow his artistic inclinations. At the outbreak of the Civil War, he enlisted and served for more than two years. In 1865 he joined Colonel Franklin L. Pope's division of the Western Union surveying party to British Columbia for which he produced sketches. In 1866 he was assigned to Siberia with the purpose of selecting a route to connect a telegraph line from San Francisco to Moscow (Russian-American telegraph). He exhibited at the San Francisco Art Association in 1874, then studied at the Belgian Royal Academy of Fine Arts, Antwerp, with Nicolas de Keyser from 1874 to 1876, and for the next ten years had a studio in North Cambridge, Massachusetts. In 1883 he produced his earliest known White Mountain work.

In 1885 he accompanied George Kennan on a second trip to Siberia to record the life of Russian exiles, during which time Frost painted several Siberian scenes. The trip was commissioned by The Century Magazine, and Frost and Kennan took numerous photographs which later were given to the Library of Congress and are now housed in the Library's Prints and Photographs Division. Selections from the George Kennan Collection in Meeting of Frontiers consists of 256 photographs taken in a wide range of locations in Siberia. Frost's drawings, some of which were copied from photographs taken during the trip, were used to illustrate Kennan's book, Siberia and the Exile System.

For a good many years, Frost had a summer home in Brownfield, Maine, near the Conway area of New Hampshire. He painted many scenes along the Saco River. He was a member of the Boston Art Club and exhibited there during the years 1896 to 1908. His last known address was Cambridge, Massachusetts.

His works are at the California State Library and the California Historical Society.

== Franconia Notch ==
George Albert Frost (1843–1907) Franconia Notch (left); Franconia Notch in 2004 (right)

Signed and dated lower right: G. A. Frost. 1883. Oil on canvas, 28 x 48 inches. Private collection

The vista into Franconia Notch from the south became known as the "Artist's View." Boston artist George Albert Frost expands our understanding of the White Mountains with an imaginative interpretation of Franconia Notch. Classically composed, with dark foliage framing the left side of the canvas and an expansive open space in the middle ground, giving way to atmospheric mountains in the distance, the notch is presented as an Arcadian idyll. Franconia Notch's appeal as a subject may reflect that life in the area was still slow-paced. Its virgin landscape was as yet hardly altered by railroads, hotels, and related improvements.

== Personal life ==
George A. Frost was married in 1882 to Adelia Dunham. They had two sons: Paul Rubens Frost (1883–1957), a notable landscape gardener, and Norman Wentworth Frost, a teacher and charter member of the American Esperanto Club.

== Exhibits ==
Concord, New Hampshire, Consuming Views: Art and Tourism in the White Mountains, 1850–1900, September 16, 2006 through October 8, 2007, #16

== Bibliography ==
- Brumfield, William С. (2012), Appointment in Dauria: George Kennan, George Frost, and the Architectural Context (PDF), Harriman Review, vol. 18, New York: Harriman Institute, Columbia University, pp. 3–57, archived from the original (PDF) on 11 December 2013.
- Campbell, Catherine H. New Hampshire Scenery. Canaan, New Hampshire: Phoenix Publishing, 1985.
- Chadbourne, Janice H. and Karl Gabosh and Charles O. Vogel, ed. The Boston Art Club Exhibition Record, 1873-1909. Madison, Connecticut: Sound View Press, 1991.
- Consuming Views: Art & Tourism in the White Mountains, 1850–1900. Concord NH: Hanover NH: New Hampshire Historical Society; Distributed by University Press of New England, 2006.
- Falk, Peter Hastings, ed. Who Was Who in American Art, 1564-1975. 3 vols. Madison, Connecticut: Sound View Press, 1999.
- Henderson, John J., "19th Century Artists in the White Mountains of New Hampshire," Heart of New Hampshire, Fall 2005.
- Henderson, John J. and Roger E. Belson, "Art & Tourism in the White Mountains, 1850-1900," American Art Review, Vol. XIX, No. 2, 2007, 109.
