= Frank Frost (disambiguation) =

Frank Frost (1936–1999) was an American blues musician.

Frank Frost may also refer to:

- Frank Frost (soccer), American football player at the 1904 Summer Olympics
- Frank A. Frost (1874–1947), New York state senator
- Frank Dutton Frost (1882–1968), British Army officer
- Frank J. Frost (1929–2026), American scholar of Ancient Greek history, archaeologist, politician, and novelist
- Frank Frost, a member of the Big Five (Scotland Yard)

== See also ==
- Francis Theodore Frost (1843–1916), Canadian politician
- Francis Seth Frost (1825–1902), painter, photographer and businessman
