= Sylvester Phelps Hodgdon =

American painter

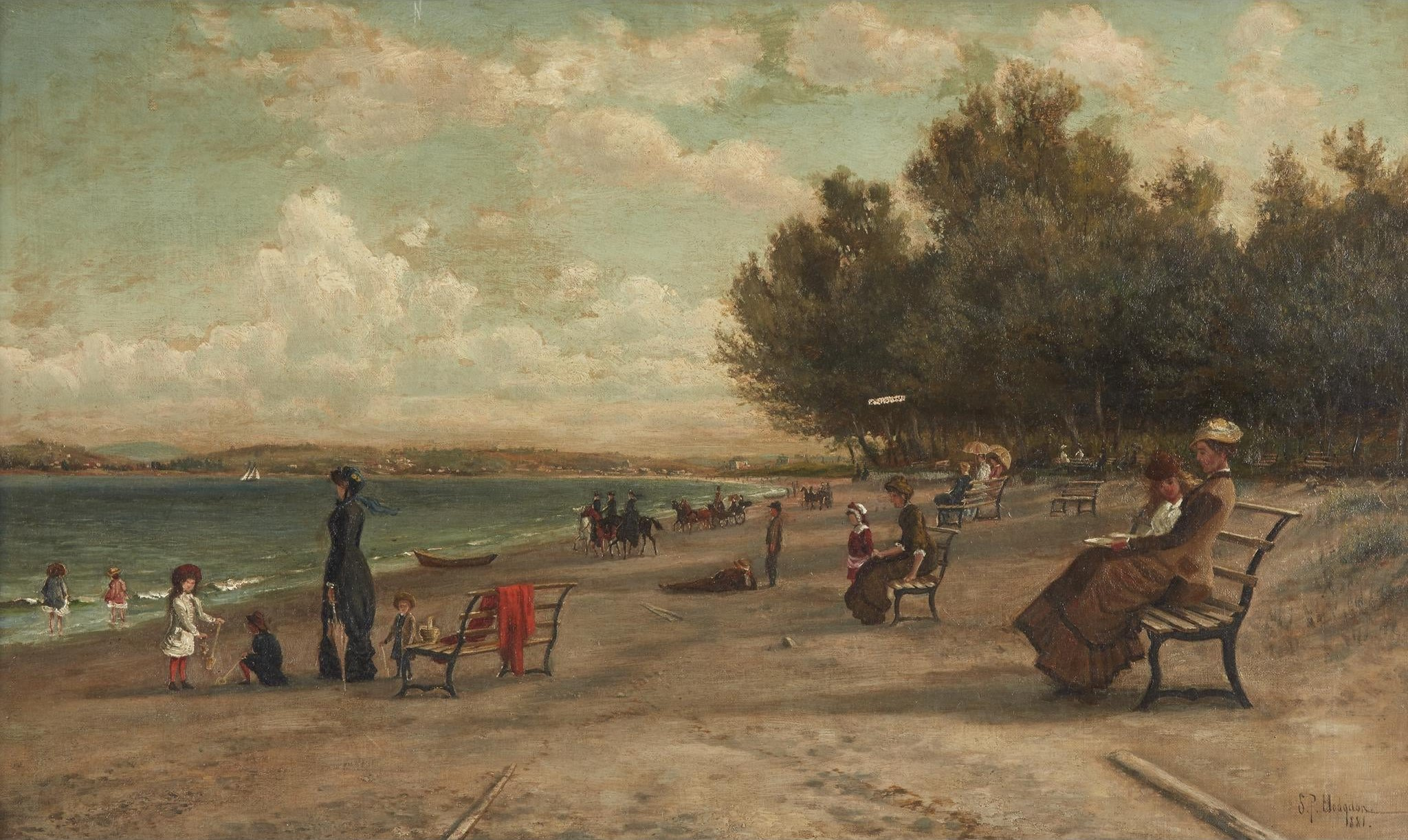
Beach Scene by Sylvester Phelps Hodgdon, 1881

Sylvester Phelps Hodgdon (1830–1906) was an American painter.

Sylvester Phelps Hodgdon was born in Salem, Massachusetts on Christmas Day 1830. Hodgdon lived in the Savin Hill section of Dorchester (part of Boston) and studied in the Boston area. He began as a portrait painter but by 1864 he was painting and exhibiting landscapes at The National Academy of Design.

Hodgdon's work was also exhibited at the Boston Athenaeum and the Boston Art Club. He traveled throughout New England painting coastal scenes and landscapes.

The Maine coast and the White Mountains of New Hampshire were two of his favorite subjects. Within the White Mountains, he preferred to paint in the region of Franconia Notch.
