= Lowell Museum =

Coordinates: 42.6457°N 71.3083°W

Founder of the Lowell Museum, Moses Kimball
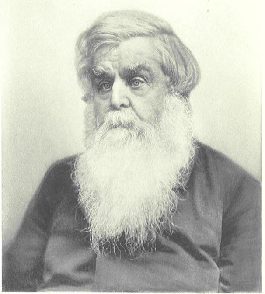

The Lowell Museum, located in Lowell, Massachusetts, was founded by Moses Kimball in 1840, as an art exhibit hall and entertainment venue.

== History ==
The Lowell Museum was housed on the upper floors of a building on Merrimack Street at the head of Central Street owned by Lowell's U.S. Postmaster, Fisher Ames Hildreth, and the theatre venue of the museum was managed by N. F. Gates.

A bayonet accidentally wounded an actor called Wheeler above the eye during one of the performances on the evening of May 26, 1853, killing him instantly in front of a packed audience.

In the mid-1850s, local artist Alfred Ordway was commissioned to paint portraits of all the presidents to adorn the museum. He finished in late 1855, only to lose them all in the fire.

According to the January 31, 1856 New York Times article, The Lowell Museum was destroyed by fire, at a loss of $15,000, which was partially insured. The fire destroyed the museum, several of the stores beneath it, including; C.W. Pratt dry goods, the Abel Whitney bookstore, R.B. Randall & Co. clothing store, and the Law Library of Benjamin Butler next door. The "Boston Nationals" who were performing in the museum's theatre managed by N.F. Gates, lost all of their costumes and belongings.

== Notable Exhibits ==
- April 1843; featured: Mr. Harrington of Boston "The original, well-known, and justly celebrated Ventriloquist, and Professor of Ledgerdemain". The advertisement in the Lowell Courier promised: "Laughable, Comical, Quisical, Mysterious, Magical, Wonderful, Astonishing Experiments of Ventriloquism, Imitations, etc, etc, etc." Tickets admitting two persons were 25 cents and the performance began at 8 PM.
- May 1843; "The Conflagration of Moscow" was staged at the Lowell Museum as a sound and light show depicting with cannon fire and military music the burning of the city by Napoleon in 1812.
- July 1843; Kip Darling performed at the Lowell Museum
- December 1848, Miss Eliza Eberle, Dancer, first performance at Lowell Museum
- From 1850-51, Mr. John Howe frequently played at the Lowell Museum.
