= Horace Wolcott Robbins =

American painter

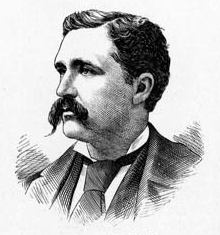
- Robbins from Art and Artists in Connecticut (1878)
- Born: October 21, 1842; Mobile, Alabama, US
- Died: 1904 (aged 61–62); New York City, US
- Occupation: Painter
- Known for: Watercolor landscapes

Horace Wolcott Robbins (21 October 1842 – 1904) was an American landscape painter known for his watercolors.

== Early years ==
Horace Wolcott Robbins was born in Mobile, Alabama, on 21 October 1842. His father came from Rocky Hill, Connecticut, descended from the first settlers there, and his mother came from Norwich, Connecticut. The family moved to Baltimore, Maryland when Robbins was aged six. He studied at Newton University in Baltimore, where he was given drawing lessons by August Weidenbach, a landscape painter from Germany. In 1859 Robbins studied under James McDougal Hart in New York City. He graduated from Newton University in 1860 and set up his own studio. During the American Civil War (1861–65) he served in the 22nd New York Regiment at the Battle of Harpers Ferry in 1862.

== Career ==
Horace Robbins was elected to the Century Association in 1863 and became an associate of the National Academy of Design in 1864. He exhibited at the Pennsylvania Academy of the Fine Arts, Philadelphia (1862–64) and at the Boston Art Association and the Brooklyn Art Association. Hugh Bolton Jones studied under Robbins for a few months. In 1865 Robbins joined Frederic Edwin Church on a visit to Jamaica and the West Indies. He then traveled to England, the Netherlands and Paris, where he set up a studio and studied with Théodore Rousseau. He married Mary Phelps of Simsbury, Connecticut at the American Legation in Paris. (Note: Mary Phelps was the daughter of George Dwight Phelps, who became president of the Delaware, Lackawanna and Western Railroad. In 1872 she inherited her father's home in Simsbury, along with a working farm.) He went on a sketching trip in Switzerland in 1866, spent more time in a studio in Paris, and returned to New York late in the fall of 1867. He settled into a routine of painting seven or eight landscapes each year.

Soon after returning to America Robbins began spending his summers in the Farmington Valley in Connecticut, making paintings of the river and woods. He built a studio near that of his friend and teacher James Hart in the Adirondack Mountains of upstate New York. He joined the American Watercolor Society, Artists' Fund Society and New York Etching Club. Robbins was elected a full member of the National Academy of Design in 1878, and in 1882 became the Academy's recording secretary. He became a trustee of the New York School of Applied Design for Women and a fellow at the Metropolitan Museum of Art.

While continuing to paint, in 1890 Robbins attended Columbia Law School. In 1892 he was admitted to the New York State Bar. Horace Wolcott Robbins died in 1904 in New York City.

== Work ==
Robbins specialized in watercolor landscapes, although he also painted in oils. His pictures of the White Mountains showed a picturesque pastoral countryside, civilized through roads, cleared hills and fields, but far from the squalor of the city. A biographer in 1878 wrote, "There was a slight mannerism in Mr. Robbin's early works, which he appears to have dropped entirely within a few years, and is rapidly gaining in an independence and originality that much better becomes him." An 1881 biographer said, "His works are spirited and refined, his artistic sympathies are in line with those of Mr. F.E. Church and Mr. Sanford Gifford, and his style is descriptive and original.

The Adirondack Museum, New York has a collection of his work.

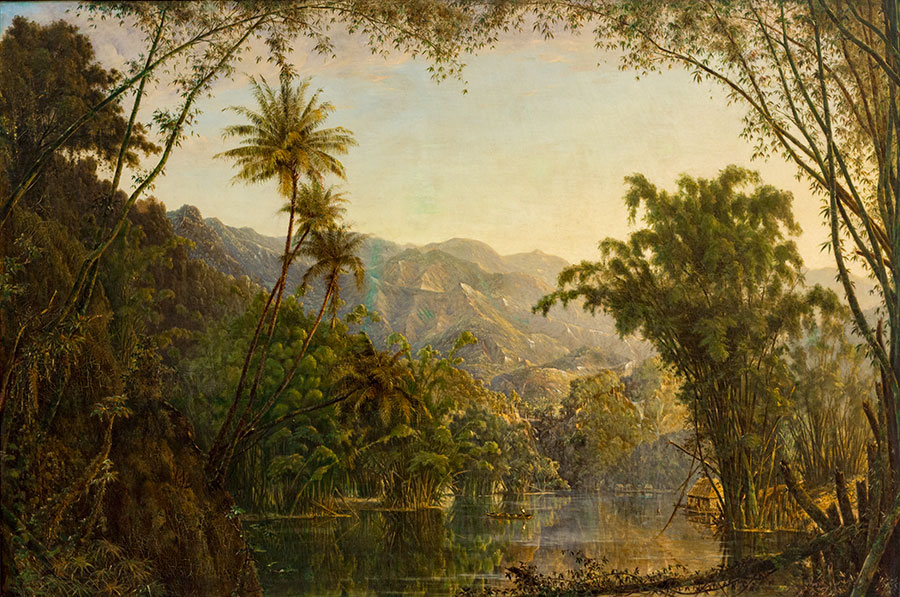
Paisaje (1865)

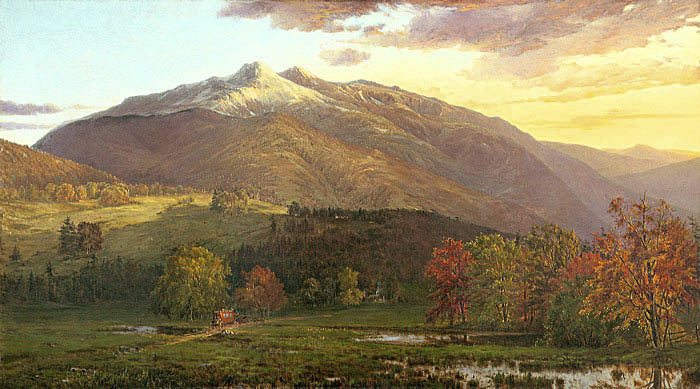
Mounts Madison and Adams (c. 1863–65)

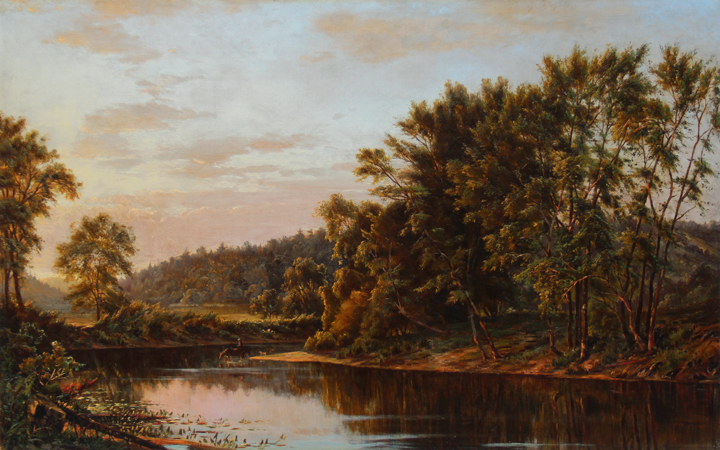
Along the River

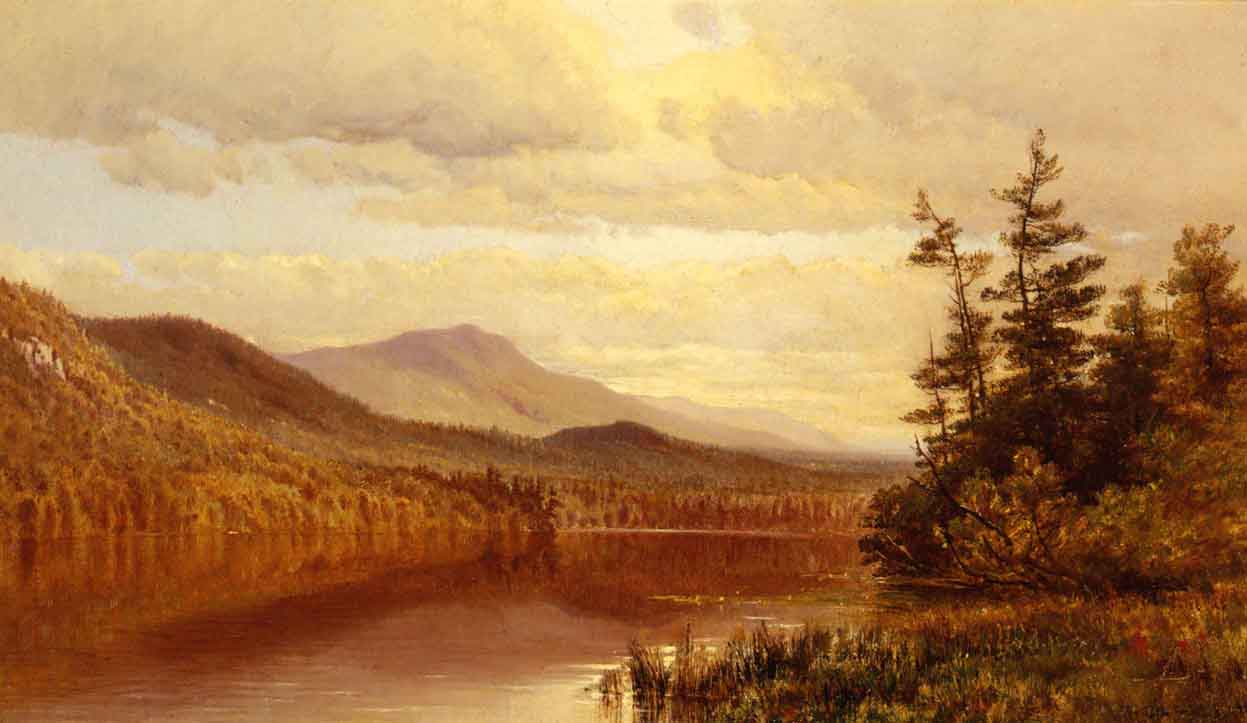
Wolf Jaw Mountain (1863)

== Sources ==
- French, Harry Willard (1878). "Horace Wolcott Robbins". Art and Artists in Connecticut. Lee and Shepard. p. 153.
- Henderson, John J.; Belson, Roger E. (2014-07-22). "Horace Wolcott Robbins". White Mountain Art & Artists.
- "Horace Wolcott Robbins". New Hampshire Historical Society.
- "Horace Wolcott Robbins". The Cooley Gallery.
- Maddox, Kenneth. W. (2014). "Hugh Bolton Jones". Museo Thyssen-Bornemisza.
- "Mounts Madison and Adams". New Hampshire Historical Society. 2006.
- Sheldon, George William (1881). "Mr. Horace Wolcott Robbins". American Painters: With One Hundred and Four Examples of Their Work Engraved on Wood. D. Appleton. p. 133.
- Springman, Mary Jane; Lahue, Alan (2011). Simsbury. Arcadia Publishing. ISBN 978-0-7385-7626-8.
