= Alfred Ordway =

American painter

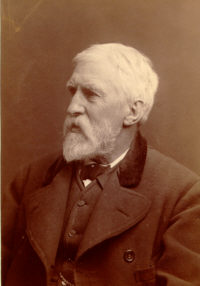
- Alfred T. Ordway as President of the Boston Art Club
- Born: Alfred T. Ordway; March 9, 1821; Roxbury, Massachusetts, US
- Died: November 17, 1897 (aged 76); Melrose Highlands, Massachusetts, US
- Occupations: landscape and portrait painter
- Known for: one of the founding fathers of the Boston Art Club
- Notable work: see list

Alfred T. Ordway (March 9, 1821 – November 17, 1897) was an American landscape and portrait painter, and one of the founding fathers of the Boston Art Club.

== Early years ==
Alfred was born in Roxbury, Massachusetts to mother Currier, and father Thomas Ordway on March 9, 1821. With his father being the city's clerk, Alfred spent the majority of his childhood in Lowell, Massachusetts, where he attended the public schools. His family can be traced back to the early 17th century when James Ordway settled in Dover, New Hampshire. Both his parents fought in the Revolutionary War, and his grandfather, Nehemiah Ordway, a physician in Amesbury, Massachusetts, was put in charge "to form and equip a company for Bunker Hill."

He first studied under a sign painter in Lowell, then portrait artist George Peter Alexander Healy, in Boston. One of his first commissions was to paint portraits of all the presidents to adorn the Lowell Museum, which shortly after he finished the museum burned to the ground.

== Career ==
In 1845, Ordway opened up his studio on Tremont Row in Boston, around the same time he and friend, Benjamin Champney, founded the Boston Art Club. He also spent the fall up north with Miss Bangs, Benjamin Champney, Richard William Hubbard, and Sanford Gifford painting landscapes in the White Mountains of New Hampshire.

He first exhibited his works at the Boston Athenaeum in 1855, and in 1856 he became Director of Exhibitions of the Boston Athenaeum till 1863, all the while exhibiting his own works each year of his eight-year term.

After leaving the Director's position, he began to frequently exhibit his works in New York at the National Academy of Design and the Brooklyn Art Association. In 1898, his works were exhibited at the Art Institute of Chicago.

By 1890, the aging artist would spend each painting season in North Conway, New Hampshire. He focused his works mainly on New England landscapes particularly: mountain streams, summer valleys, and mountain peaks with a poetic feel for nature. As he often said, he "tried to paint nature exactly as he saw it."

According to The New York Times obituary, Alfred Ordway died on November 17, 1897, of heart disease while visiting a friend in Melrose Highlands, Massachusetts. He was 76.

== Notable works ==
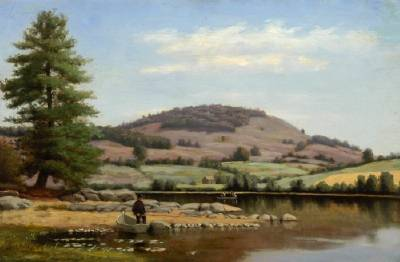
Fishing on Fairlee Pond, Mount Mansfield, Vermont

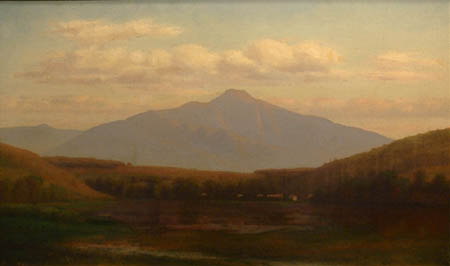
Mt. Mansfield, Vermont (1870)

- Fishing on Fairlee Pond, Mount Mansfield, Vermont
- The Lily Pond
- The country garden
- The Pumpkin Patch
