= Benjamin Champney =

American painter (1817–1907)

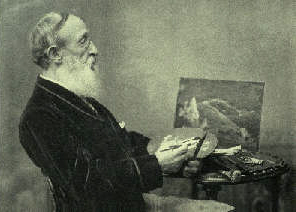
- Benjamin Champney
- Born: November 20, 1817; New Ipswich, New Hampshire, US
- Died: December 11, 1907 (aged 90); Woburn, Massachusetts, US
- Resting place: Woburn, Massachusetts
- Education: Pendleton
- Known for: Painting, lithography

Benjamin Champney (November 20, 1817 – December 11, 1907) was a painter known for his role in White Mountain art of the 19th century. He began his training as a lithographer under celebrated marine artist Fitz Henry Lane at Pendleton's Lithography shop in Boston. Most art historians consider him the founder of the "North Conway Colony" of painters who came to North Conway, New Hampshire, and the surrounding area during the second half of the 19th century. His paintings were often used to make chromolithographs that were subsequently sold to tourists who could not afford Champney's originals. He exhibited regularly at the Boston Athenæum and was a founder of the Boston Art Club.

== Early life ==
Champney was born in New Ipswich, New Hampshire. He first visited Conway in 1838. In 1841, Champney went to France to study, returning to Boston in 1846, and then returned to Europe almost at once to paint a panorama of the Rhine River. He returned to Boston in 1848 and exhibited the panorama there in December. It was subsequently exhibited in Worcester, Massachusetts, New Haven, Connecticut, and New York City. In 1854, he went on a painting trip to Germany and Switzerland with John Frederick Kensett. The panorama, unfortunately, was destroyed by fire in New York City in October 1857.

== Allure of North Conway ==
In 1850, Champney returned to the White Mountains with his friend, Kensett. Their enthusiasm and paintings drew large numbers of Boston and New York artists to the Conway area. In 1853, Champney married and bought a house between Conway and North Conway. It would be his summer home for over fifty years. His studio was a noted social center, and was visited by many people from all parts of the country.

In 1855, Champney became a founder of the Boston Art Club, and, in 1856, its president.

On August 4, 1888, The White Mountain Echo reported: "Champney's studio is as much visited as ever this summer, and there are many new pictures to see. Of the landscapes, there is a view from the new carriage road up Humphrey's Ledge that is beautiful, and another a scene in Crawford Notch, and still another, a picture of Mount Chocorua from Tamworth; there are some lovely new flower pieces ... But perhaps the very prettiest is the old-fashioned pitcher in the kitchen window ..."

== Later life and legacy ==
In 1900, he published an autobiography, Sixty Years' Memories of Art and Artists.

Champney died at his home in Woburn, Massachusetts, on December 11, 1907.

Examples of his paintings can be viewed today at the New Hampshire Historical Society in Concord, New Hampshire; the Currier Museum of Art in Manchester, New Hampshire; the White Mountain Museum & Gallery in North Conway, NH and at the Winn Memorial Library in Woburn, Massachusetts.

Champney's brother, George Mather Champney, was the first Librarian of the Winn Memorial Library in Woburn, Massachusetts. Many of Benjamin Champney's artworks were given to the library on behalf of George Mather Champney. Several of these works are on display in the library's Frizzell Study Hall; the rest are stored in the library's Glennon Archives.

In recognition of his unique and lasting contribution to the arts and culture of Boston, a gaslit cobblestone alley, Champney Place, is named in his honor in historic Beacon Hill, Boston. He is mentioned on a New Hampshire historical marker (number 38) along New Hampshire Route 16 in Conway.

== Image gallery ==
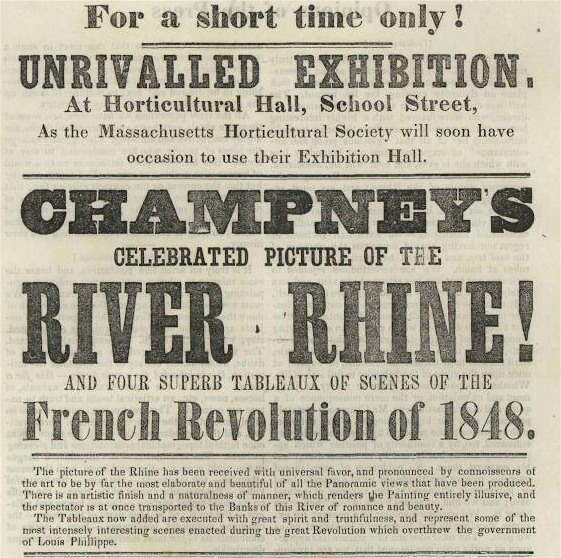
Advertisement for exhibition of works by Champney at Horticultural Hall, School Street, Boston, 1849

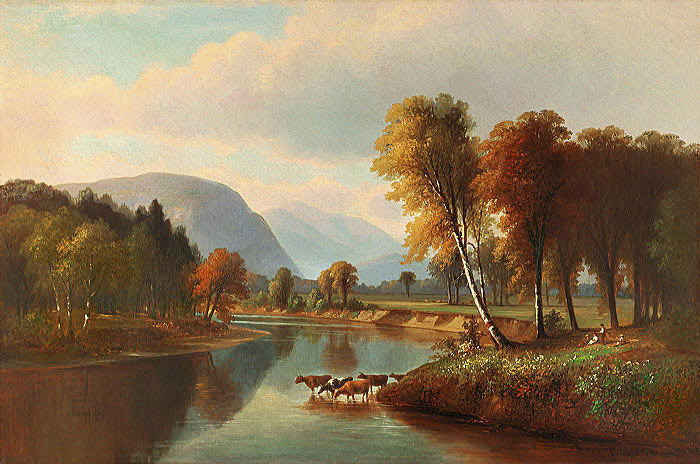
Saco River, North Conway

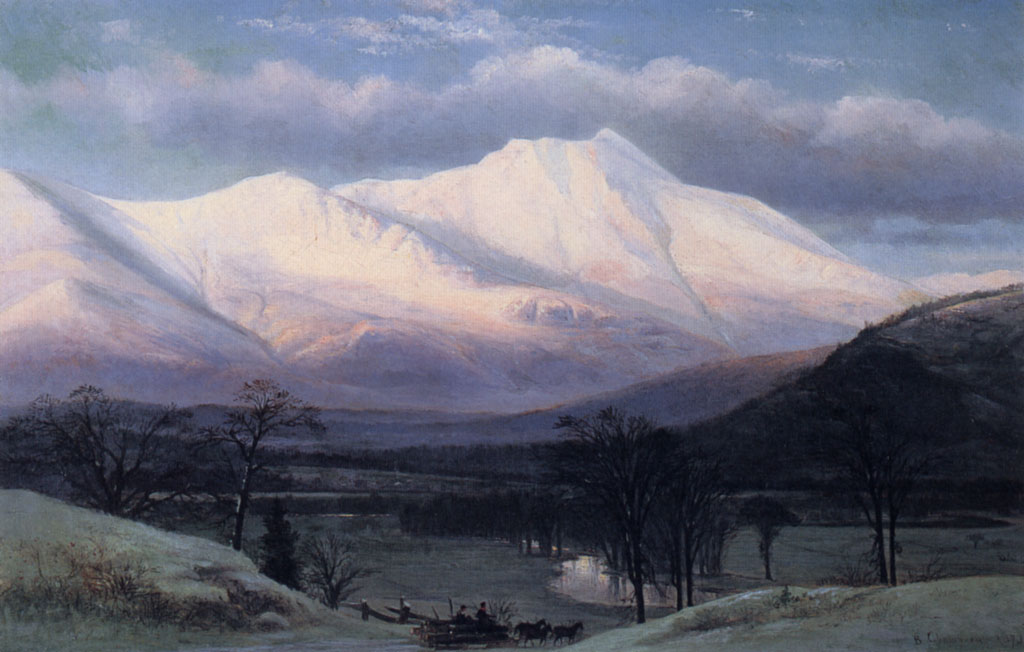
Winter Scene, North Moat Mountain, New Hampshire, 1873

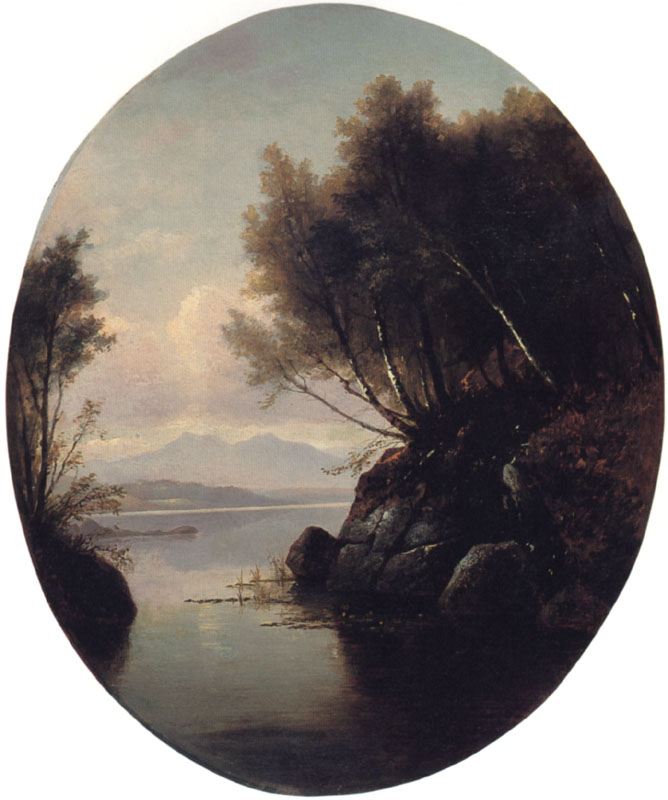
Moat Mountain from Walker's Pond, New Hampshire, 1878

Autumn Landscape, 1867
A typical early painting by Champney

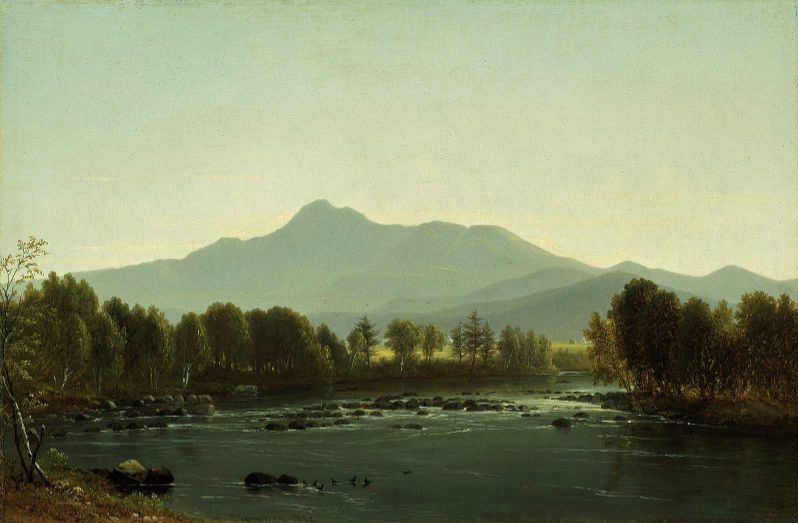
Mount Chocorua, New Hampshire, 1858

== Sources ==
- "Beauty Caught and Kept: Benjamin Champney in the White Mountains". Historical New Hampshire, Vol. 51, Nos. 3&4, Fall/Winter 1996.
- Campbell, Catherine H. New Hampshire Scenery, Canaan, NH: Phoenix Publishing, 1985.
- Champney, Benjamin. Sixty Years' Memories of Art and Artists, Woburn, MA: Wallace & Andrews, 1900.
