= Boston Art Club =

Arts organization in Massachusetts, US

The Boston Art Club is an arts organization in Boston, Massachusetts, which serves to help its members, as well as non-members, to access the world of fine art. It currently has more than 250 members.

== History ==
The Boston Art Club was first conceived in Boston in 1854 with the consolidation of efforts between local artists, including Benjamin Champney, Alfred Ordway, Samuel Lancaster Gerry and Walter Brackett. Their desire was to form a democratic organization where the European tradition of independent, master-artists would be replaced with cooperation in the promotion, sale and education of art.

They held their first official meeting on New Year's Day, 1855, when they named themselves the Boston Art Club. They elected three presidents: Joseph Alexander Ames, Walter Brackett, and Benjamin Champney. It is not known why they chose three Presidents that first year. The only other two officers elected were a Treasurer and a Recording Secretary. It is said that there were twenty founding Members that also included Francis Seth Frost, Samuel W. Griggs, Edward Pressey, Frederick Dickinson Williams, and Moses Wright. The Members were a combination of Academically trained Artists who had studied in Europe, and Artists who picked up their trade studying with local Boston Artists teaching in the old European tradition of Master/Student. The Boston Art Club founding Members painted in the local New England area.

One of the first orders of business for the newly formed Club was to mount an exhibition. Alfred Ordway, a Club founder, had a relationship with the Boston Athenaeum, one of the oldest libraries in America, and the Boston Art Club was able to secure an exhibition there in 1855. Ordway became the director of paintings at the Boston Athenaeum from 1856–63. The first Boston Art Club exhibition was in combination with several New York colleagues, including Frederic Church, Asher Durand, and John Kensett.

The first exhibition was a success. The Club moved to a building on Bedford Street. They held their second exhibition in 1856 which was marred with a burglary of several paintings from the show (which were never recovered). This almost ended the existence of the Club, but for the help of a local thespian who put on William Shakespeare's A Midsummer Night's Dream and raised enough money to pay for the lost paintings. The Club continued at this Bedford Street location until the outbreak of the American Civil War, when the Club suspended all activities.

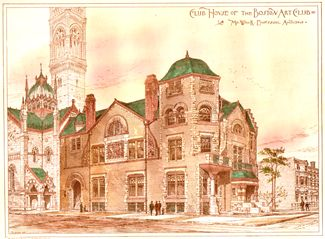
Boston Art Club at 150 Newbury Street, designed by William Ralph Emerson, 1882

After the War, and until 1871, there was no fixed location of the Club. Exhibitions began again in the studios of the various Artist Members. They gained sufficient support from these exhibitions to be formally incorporated by the Commonwealth of Massachusetts on March 3, 1871. The purpose of the incorporation was, "For the purpose of advancing the fine arts by the establishment of a Gallery and Library". During the period, from 1871–82, until a more permanent building was established, the Club rented spaces at 64 Boylston Street, in a building next to the Grand Lodge of Massachusetts. The success of the Boston Art Club during this period was due to Charles Callahan Perkins, one of the three corporate officers: Charles Callahan Perkins, Horace H. Moses, and George D. Russell.

According to art historian Nancy Jarzombek, "Charles Callahan Perkins met with an old friend, amateur painter and music publisher George D. Russell, to discuss reviving the Boston Art Club. With Perkins at the helm they called a general meeting, and the suddenly revived club opened its membership to upper-class men who professed an interest in art (it remained firmly closed to women for the next six decades). The Club engaged a bow-front brick townhouse on Boylston Street for its quarters. In 1871, Perkins, Russell and Horace H. Moses, none of them professional artists, signed the petition to incorporate the Art Club and Perkins was elected President. The Club added a spacious picture gallery behind the building and in 1873 opened its first annual exhibition. From an informal artists' supper club, Perkins created a refined gentlemen's club with dining and reading rooms, an extensive library, paintings collection and a picture gallery. It hosted two juried exhibitions annually and had a large general membership. The Club also hosted informal gatherings for its members on the first Saturday of each month. Artists would bring in prints or watercolors to critique."

150 Newbury Street details
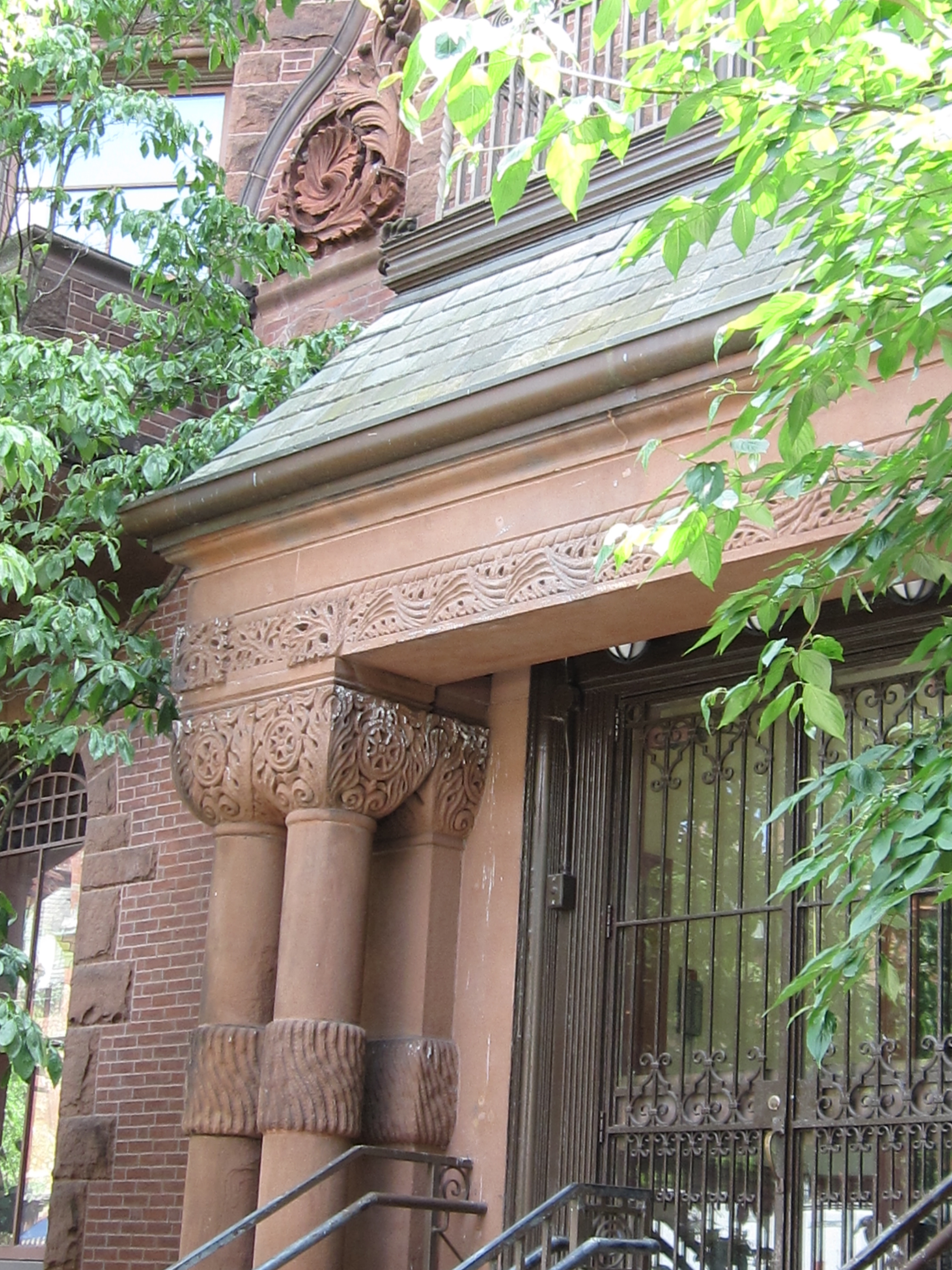
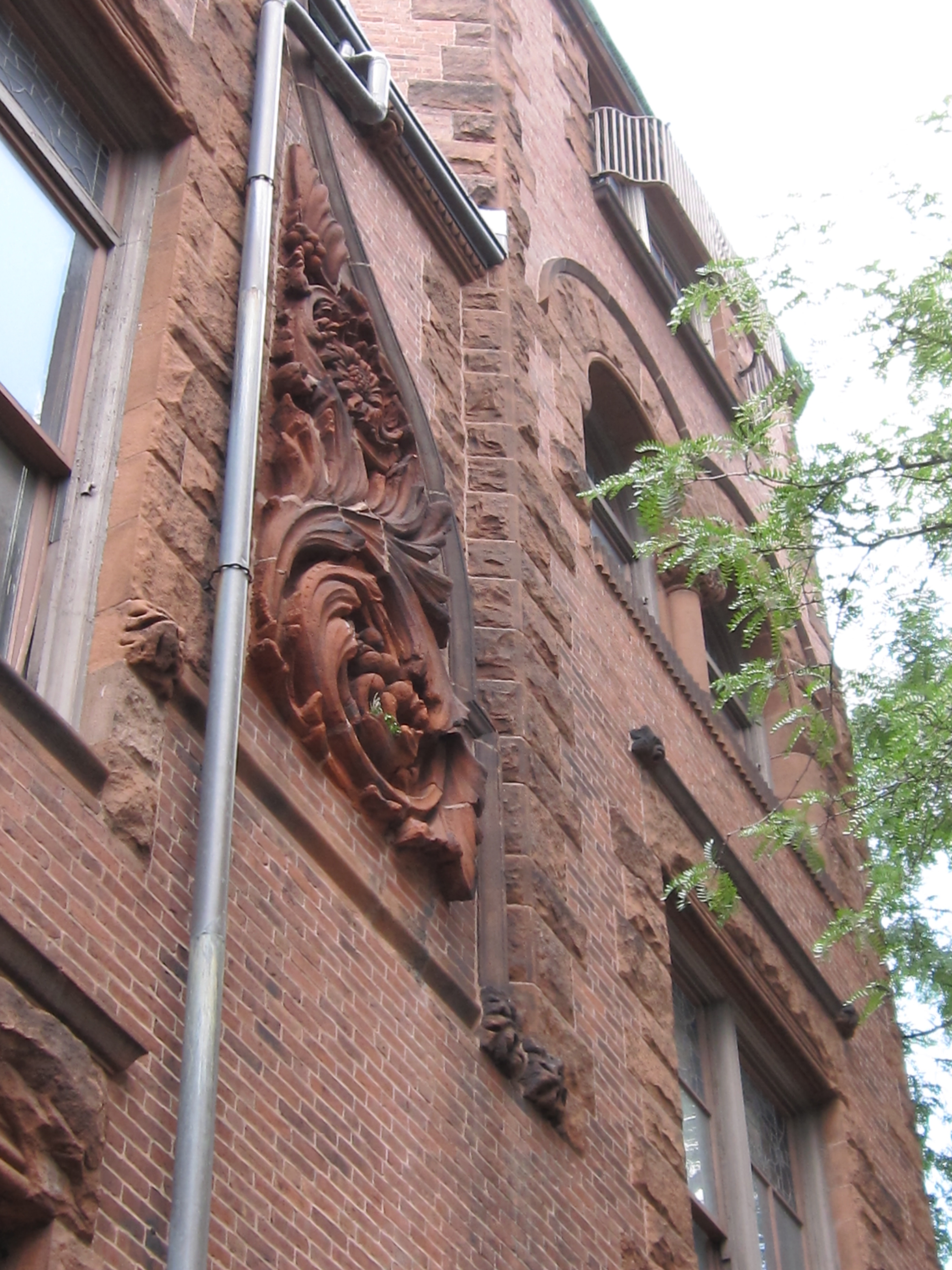

In the late 1870s the City of Boston undertook a new project to expand the city through the filling of the Back Bay. While this project was being implemented, the Club decided that it would create a new Club House in what was to become the most fashionable area of Boston. It took nearly a decade to raise sufficient funds, but with over five hundred Members by 1880, eventually there was enough to launch a national contest by architects for the new Club House building. The winning plan was submitted by William Ralph Emerson. The Club House was completed in 1882 (see above image).

Once the Club House was opened, it became a national attraction for artists to exhibit. William Merritt Chase, Winslow Homer, John Singer Sargent, Edmund H. Garrett, Frank W. Benson, Edmund Charles Tarbell and virtually every major National and International Artist sent paintings for the many shows. The number of Artist Members was just a quarter or the total membership. The Club became a social outpost for the wealthy Bostonian Art Collectors like Isabella Stewart Gardner. In 1910 the Club refitted the Clubhouse to accommodate dining and sleeping. The membership fees when the Club opened the Club House were $60, but it had increased to almost $800 by 1914 to support the life-style of the new non-Artist Members.

Because there were so few actual artists as club members, there was great resistance for any major change in the artistic taste of the Club. By the early 20th century, artists were returning from Europe, with a totally different idea of Art. They saw the works of Picasso, Cézanne and Matisse. Then came the Boston exhibition in 1913 of the Armory Show, and its influence on the local Boston Art scene threatened the Club with new influences and Art Styles; Modernism, Cubism, Abstract Art.

Nancy Jarzombek describes this eventual conflict in the Club: "In 1917 (Charles Hovey) Pepper became Director of the Exhibitions Committee, and he put his friends Charles Hopkinson and Harley Perkins on the committee. Together they proceeded to exhibit the work by traditional painters shoulder to shoulder with paintings by more modern artists. In the fall of 1918 Pepper initiated the New England Artists' Series, an annual exhibition of young, little-known but talented artists. Pepper's efforts were applauded by some of Boston's most important critics. The general public thought otherwise.... It couldn't last. In 1928 the Art Club fired the entire Exhibitions Committee. The embroglio involved even the Governor of Massachusetts, Alvan T. Fuller, who was a Member of the Art Club and who placed himself on the new Exhibition Committee."

The Boston Art Club floundered through the next two decades as the Great Depression, and World War II and a fall in membership eventually made the need for the large Club House unnecessary. In 1950 the Club House was closed and is now Snowden International School a Boston public school

The remaining members of the Boston Art Club maintained their relationship much like their founders after the American Civil War. They remained connected socially, painted together, and occasionally had exhibitions in their own studios.

With the arrival of a few new artist members, a new president, and the Internet, the Club was able to create a virtual presence on the web. The club membership began to rise to where now there are over 500 active Members. There are no longer periodic exhibitions. The purpose of the club is still to develop the appreciation of art through its Members and also by working nationally with art museums in helping to place paintings in prominent art shows throughout the country.

== See also ==
- White Mountain art
- Tommaso Juglaris
