= Samuel Lancaster Gerry =

American painter

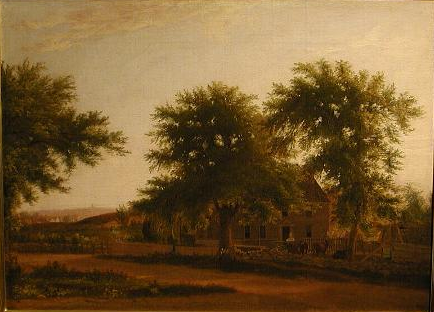
Rural Homestead, 1840, by S.L. Gerry

Samuel Lancaster Gerry (1813–1891) was an artist in 19th-century Boston, Massachusetts. He painted portraits and also landscapes of the White Mountains and other locales in New England. He was affiliated with the New England Art Union, and the Boston Artists' Association. In 1857 he co-founded the Boston Art Club.

Born in Boston, Gerry was self-taught as an artist. He showed works in many public settings, such as the 1841 exhibit of the Massachusetts Charitable Mechanic Association; and an 1879 exhibit of contemporary art at the Museum of Fine Arts, Boston. He attended the 1860 convention of the National Art Association in Washington, DC. Students of Gerry included H. Frances Osborne, Samuel Green Wheeler Benjamin, Fannie Elliot Gifford, Charles Wesley Sanderson, and J. Frank Currier. With the exception of three years abroad, his professional life was passed chiefly in Boston.
