= Ignaz Gaugengigl =

German-American painter

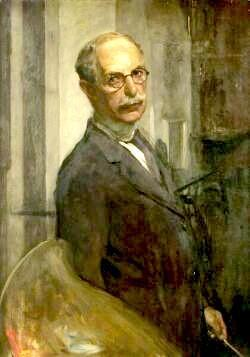
Ignaz Gaugengigl, self-portrait

Ignaz Michael Marcel Gaugengigl (16 January 1855 – 3 August 1932) was a German-American painter and engraver who worked primarily in the United States. He specialized in portraits and historical paintings.

== Biography ==
Ignaz Gaugengigl was born in Passau, Bavaria on 16 January 1855. His father (also named Ignaz) was a teacher who wrote several books on linguistics and related subjects. After finishing school, he attended the Academy of Fine Arts Munich, where he studied under Johann Leonhard Raab and Wilhelm von Diez.

In 1880, he visited his sister in Boston and decided to settle there himself. He quickly assimilated into the city's cultural life and became a friend of Sylvester Koehler, the first curator of prints at the Boston Museum of Fine Arts. He was known as the "Meissonier of Boston", because of his many portraits of the "Boston Brahmins" and their families, and was one of the founders of the Guild of Boston Artists. Most of his works are in private collections.

He died at his studio in Boston on 3 August 1932.
