= Francis Seth Frost =

American painter

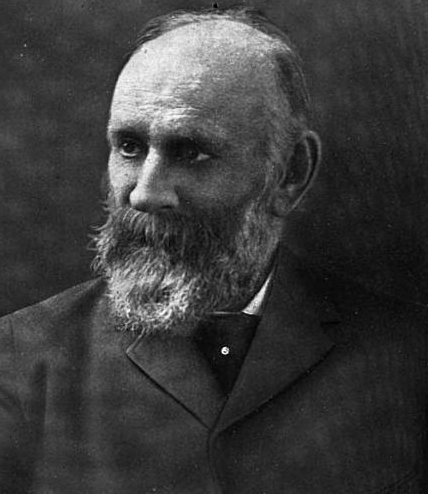
Portrait of F.S. Frost

Francis Seth Frost (1825–1902) or F.S. Frost was a painter, photographer, and businessman specializing in artists' materials. Based in Boston, Massachusetts, he travelled widely in the United States. Friends included Albert Bierstadt. Frost kept an art studio in the Studio Building on Tremont Street in Boston. In 1869 with E.H. Adams he began the artists' supply firm, Frost & Adams, which flourished into the 20th century.

== Images ==
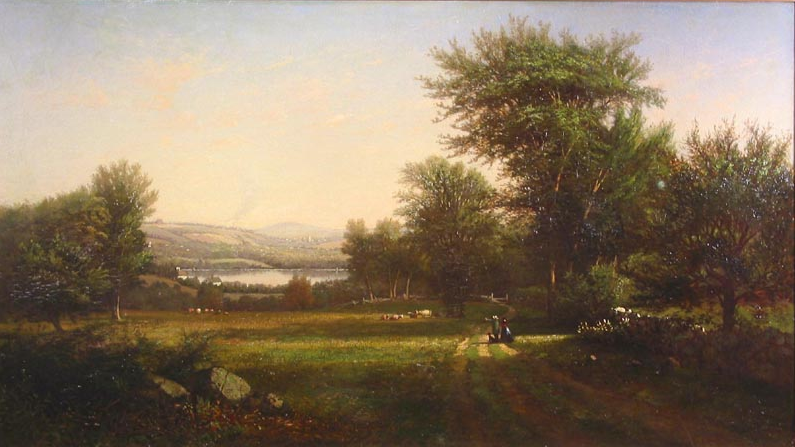
Lake Winnipesaukee, 19th century

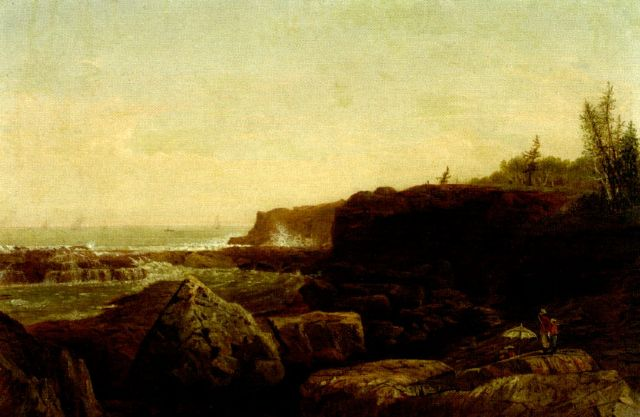
Rocky New England coast, 1866

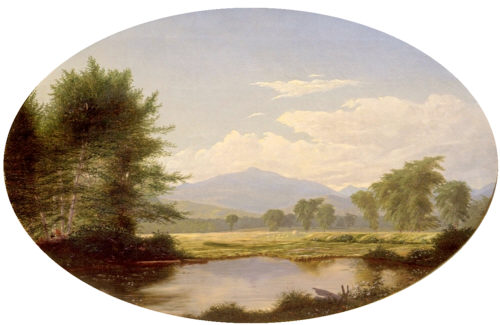
Mt. Washington, 19th century
