= Horticultural Hall =

Horticultural Hall may refer to:

- Horticultural Hall (Boston), built in 1901 as a headquarters for the Massachusetts Horticultural Society
  - Horticultural Hall, Boston (1845), predecessor of the above, built 1845
  - Horticultural Hall, Boston (1865), predecessor of the above, built 1865
- Horticultural Hall (Lake Geneva, Wisconsin), conference center built in 1911
- Horticultural Hall (Philadelphia), built in 1876 for the Centennial Exposition, demolished in 1954. Today the site of Fairmount Park Horticulture Center
- Royal Horticultural Society Old Hall, London, built in 1904 as an exhibition hall for the Royal Horticultural Society, now known as Lindley Hall, London
- Royal Horticultural Society New Hall, London, built in 1925–8 as an exhibition hall for the Royal Horticultural Society but no longer owned by them, now known as Lawrence Hall, London
- Horticultural Hall, Melbourne, built in 1873 and now known as Horti Hall
- Horticultural Hall (West Chester, Pennsylvania), historic opera hall designed by Thomas U. Walter, home to the Chester County History Center
