= Symphony and Horticultural Halls =

- U.S. National Register of Historic Places
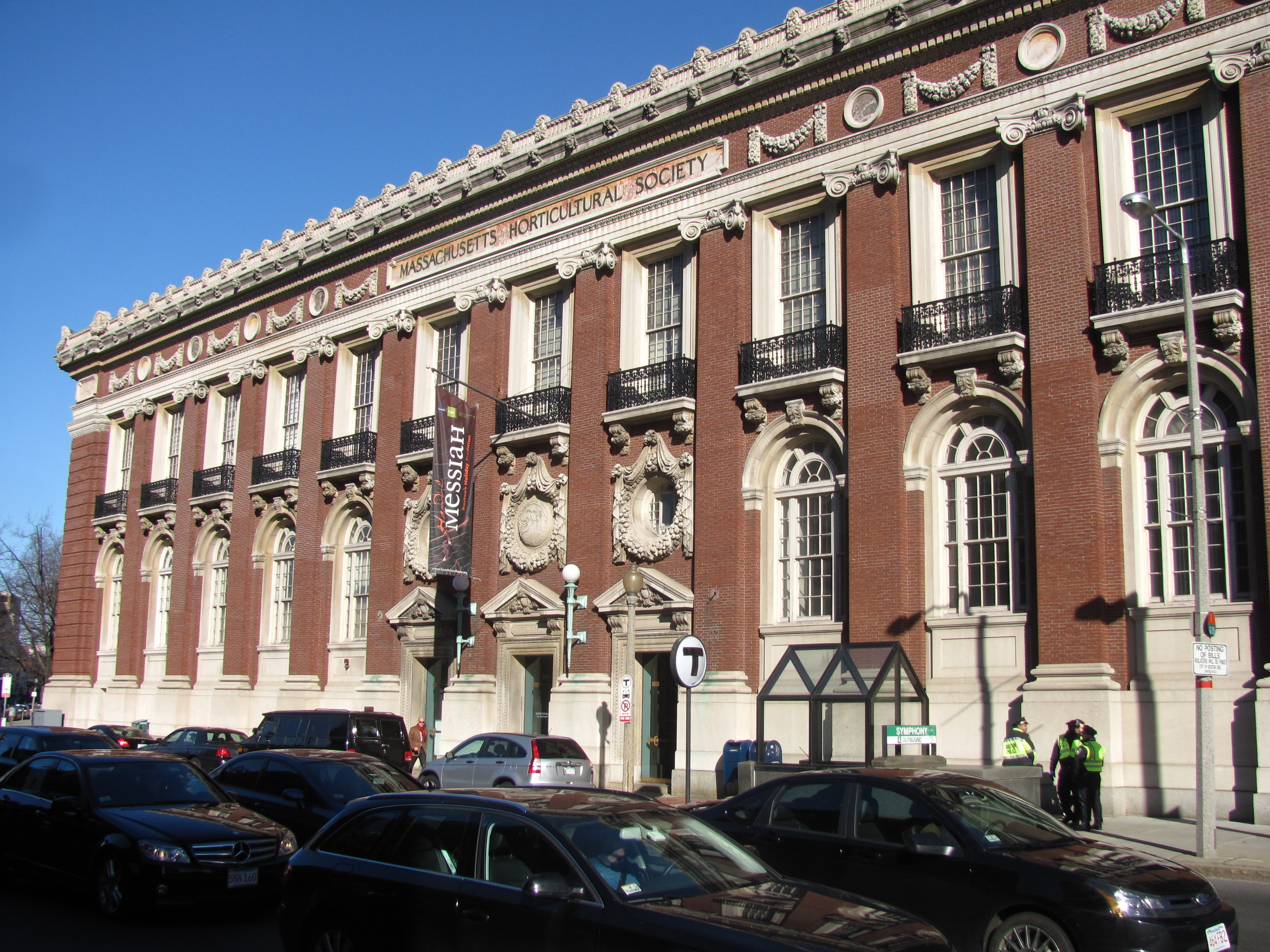
- Horticultural Hall

- Location within Massachusetts Location within the United States
- Location: Boston, Massachusetts
- Coordinates: 42°20′35″N 71°5′8″W
- Built: 1900
- Architect: McKim, Mead & White; Wheelwright & Haven
- Architectural style: Late 19th And 20th Century Revivals
- NRHP reference No.: 75000301
- Added to NRHP: May 30, 1975

Symphony and Horticultural Halls are historic buildings at the corner of Massachusetts and Huntington Avenues in the Fenway–Kenmore neighborhood of Boston, Massachusetts. The halls were listed as a pair on the National Register of Historic Places in 1975. Symphony Hall was designated a National Historic Landmark in 1999.

== Symphony Hall ==
Symphony Hall is a large, rectangular performance space designed by McKim, Mead and White, and built in 1900 by the Norcross Brothers for the Boston Symphony Orchestra. The Italian Renaissance Revival building rests on thousands of wooden pilings embedded in filled land, and is one of the city's first steel-framed buildings. It is clad in brick, with limestone trim. Its main entrance, now on Massachusetts Avenue, was originally intended for arrivals by carriage, while the original main entrance was through the columned portico on Huntington Avenue.

== Horticultural Hall ==
Horticultural Hall was designed by Wheelwright and Haven and completed in 1901. It is a two-story Beaux Arts brick and stone structure, extending along Massachusetts Avenue opposite the current main entrance to Symphony Hall. It was built by the Massachusetts Horticultural Society, founded in 1832, and originally housed its offices, as well as a lecture hall and exhibition spaces. It now houses the offices of Boston magazine and the Handel and Haydn Society, among others.

== Historic significance of the pair ==
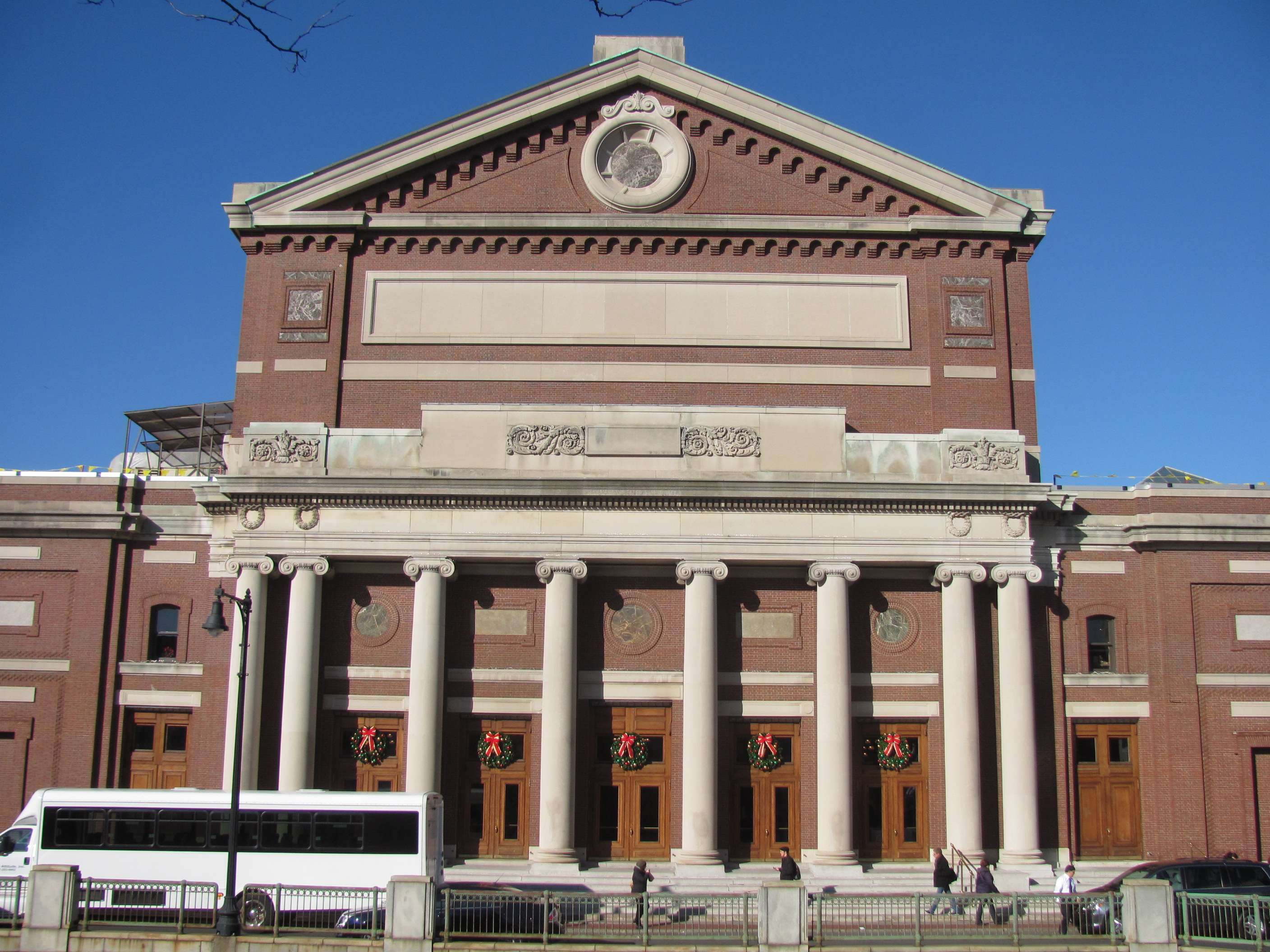
Symphony Hall

These two buildings are primary examples of a shift in the late 19th and early 20th centuries of Boston's cultural institutions toward spacious Back Bay locations. At the time of their respective constructions, the Boston Symphony Orchestra and the Massachusetts Horticultural Society were both major civic cultural organizations. The area in which they were built was until the 1880s part of Boston's Back Bay. This area, once tidally covered mud flats, had become a fetid cesspool by the 1850s, and was filled in to create new land for development over a three decade period. The orchestra and society were preceded by other major institutions, including the First Church of Christ, Scientist and the Massachusetts Charitable Mechanic Association, both of which built new facilities along Huntington Avenue, and were followed by New England Conservatory, the Boston Opera House, and the Boston Museum of Fine Arts. Both the opera house and Mechanics Hall were demolished in the 1950s. These buildings are the most distinctive pair left from this period of development.

== See also ==
- National Register of Historic Places listings in southern Boston, Massachusetts
