= Hutchinson Family Singers =

American family singing group

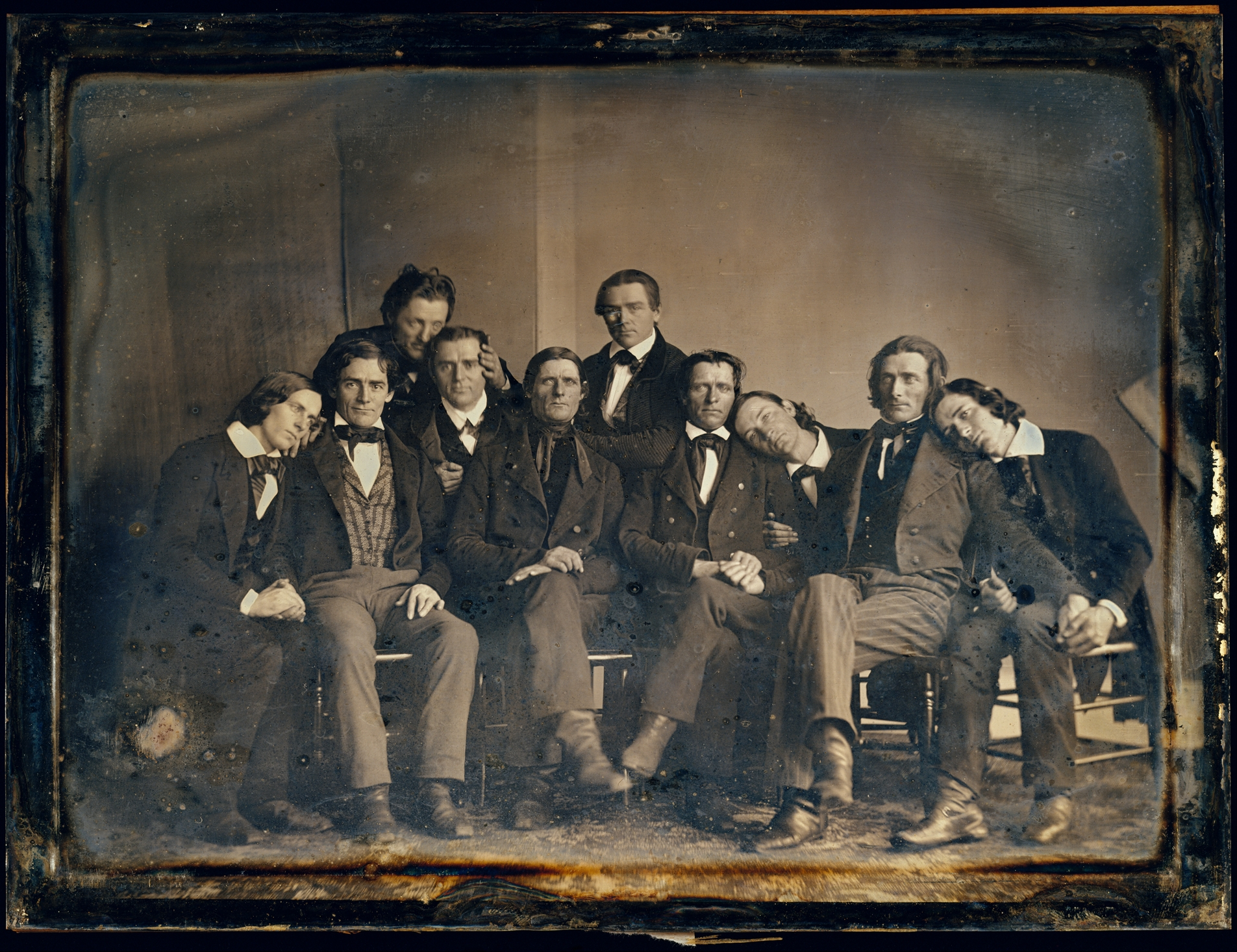
Ten of the Hutchinsons, 1845 l.t.r. Asa, Andrew, Jesse, Joshua, David, Caleb, Noach, Judson, Zephanaiah .

The Hutchinson Family Singers were an American family singing group who became the most popular American entertainers of the 1840s. The group sang in four-part harmony a repertoire of political, social, comic, sentimental and dramatic works, and are considered by many to be the first uniquely American popular music performers. The group formed in the wake of a string of successful tours by Austrian singing groups such as the Tyrolese Minstrels and when American newspapers were demanding the cultivation of native talent. John Hutchinson orchestrated the group's formation with his brothers Asa, Jesse, and Judson Hutchinson in 1840; the Hutchinsons (11 sons, two daughters) gave their first performance on November 6 of that same year. The popularization of group singing in America arguably began with them. Jesse Hutchinson quit the main group to write songs and manage their affairs; he was replaced by sister Abby Hutchinson.

The Hutchinsons were a hit with both audiences and critics, and they toured the United States. They popularized four-part close harmony. The group's material included controversial material promoting abolitionism, workers' rights, temperance, and women's rights, all stances popularized by the Second Great Awakening.

The family lived in Lynn, Massachusetts in a 5.5 acre compound of multiple cottages on the southern slopes of what is now High Rock Reservation. Jesse Hutchinson sited the first cottage after a well on the site was located by a "clairvoyant". Jesse Hutchinson also commissioned Alonzo Lewis to build the first High Rock Tower between 1847 and 1848. The Hutchinsons later leased the Tower to a group for "electrical experiments". John Hutchinson gave the land to the City of Lynn just after the turn of the 20th Century, with the stipulation that an observatory be constructed.

== History ==
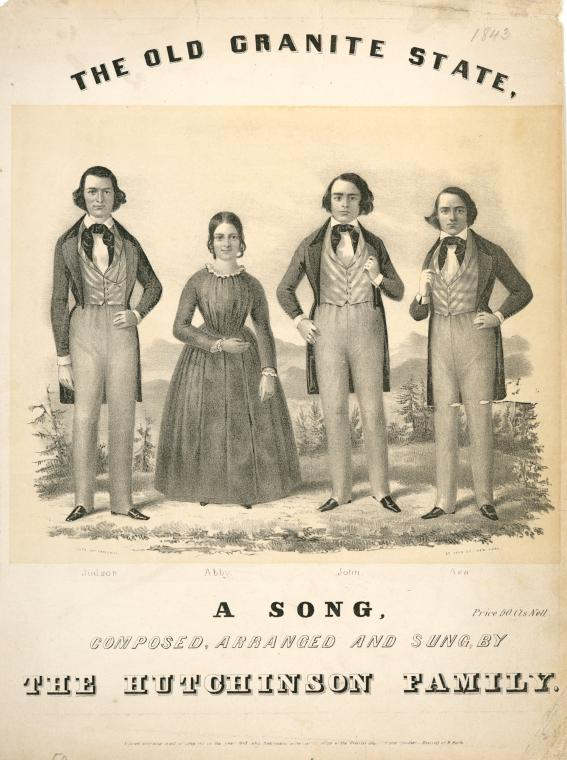
"The Old Granite State" sheet music cover, c. 1843.

=== Formation and early performances ===
In the 1830s, European itinerant entertainers such as the Austrian Tyrolese Minstrels and the Strassers toured the United States and whetted American appetites for groups who sang in four-part harmony. John Hutchinson saw a Tyrolese Minstrels concert in either Boston or Lynn, Massachusetts, probably in 1840. He was impressed by what he heard, and he decided to teach the rest of his family to sing in the same style.

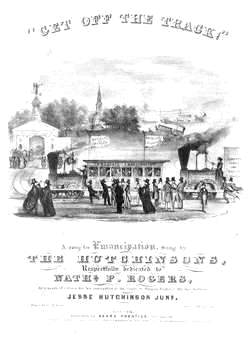
Sheet music for "Get Off the Track", by the Hutchinson Family, 1844

John Hutchinson and three of his brothers (Asa, Jesse, and Judson) dubbed themselves the Hutchinson Family Singers. They gave their first concert in the Baptist Meeting House in Milford, NH, on November 6, 1840, reviewed the following day by "G." for the Milford Cabinet. They performed again in Lynn the following year. The group sang mostly European songs, such as those by Henry Russell, George F. Root or the Tyrolese Rainers, but Jesse Hutchinson soon quit to write original material and to manage the group's affairs. The remaining three members eventually adopted the name Aeolian Singers. Twelve-year-old Abby Hutchinson, an alto who sang 2nd tenor in the TTBB voicing, took Jesse Hutchinson's place to complete the quartet.

When a member of the group wrote a new song, each of the four singers individually decided his or her own part to create the harmony. John Hutchinson later recalled:

Judson had a naturally high voice, a pure tenor. My voice was a baritone, though I sang falsetto easily, and Asa had a deep bass. Abby had an old-fashioned "counter" or contralto voice. The result was an effect like that of a male quartet. Abby's part being the first tenor, Judson's second tenor, mine first and Asa's second bass, respectively. But we practiced an interchange of parts as we sang, and the blending of the voices was so perfect that it seemed quite impossible for the audience to distinguish the several parts.

=== Success ===
The Hutchinsons performed across New England in 1842, taking in as much as $130 (~$4,236 in 2024) per performance. In 1843, Jesse wrote "The Old Granite State", a song about the Hutchinson family, their origins in New Hampshire, and their itinerant lifestyle. The song became their signature number.

American newspapers of the time were trumpeting "native talent", and critics responded favorably to the Hutchinsons' early concerts, although they did express misgivings about the group's song selection. After the Hutchinson Family Singers' first New York City concert on May 13, 1843, the New York Tribune wrote:

The Hutchinson family gave a concert on Saturday evening and acquitted themselves quite well. They . . . know how to make music, decidedly, though some of their songs are not well chosen either to gratify the audience or exhibit their peculiar powers. We wish they would take care to favor the unscientific public with the words of their songs distinctly. Russell does so, and it is to thousands one of the best points of his singing.

When the Hutchinsons' advertised in the Herald on May 13, 1843, that their program featured "their most popular Quartettes, Trios, Solos, such as have not failed to please fashionable audiences in Boston and many other cities and towns in New England", the Tribune responded:

They need not fear in New York to give us songs embodying Sentiment as well as those of a descriptive or humorous character. We trust they will be heard again and more than once in our city; for we are sure there are thousands among us who would hear them with signal satisfaction.

After a performance at the New York Society Library on May 17, the Tribune was more approving:

Their style of singing is admirable—simple, sweet, and full of mountain melody. Their voices are all rich and dear, and their whole execution is in a most chaste and grateful style... Mr. Hutchinson not only sang "The Maniac" but acted it—and that in a manner not only perfectly chaste and without offending delicacy and decorum but with clear adherence to truth and great effect...

The Tribune still disapproved of their song choices, asking "How can they choose [their programs] so badly?" and claiming that poems set to music and rehashed songs from other composers with only a few new pieces were not good enough.

Nevertheless, the Hutchinsons were a hit, the first American close-harmony quartet to see such success. They adopted the name "Tribe of Jesse" after further touring in 1843. Imitators appeared, and the Hutchinsons even toured with one of these, the Luca family, in 1859. Four-part harmony became an important component of all American popular music. Minstrel show troupes compared themselves to the Hutchinsons. In 1844, the Congo Minstrels advertised that "their songs are sung in Harmony in the style of the Hutchinson Family." Other minstrels parodied the group. The Harmoneon Family Singers (later the Boston Harmoneons) wore powdered wigs and faces and called themselves the Albino Minstrels or the Albino Family in what was supposed to be a blackface show.

In 1845, the family toured Great Britain. Meanwhile, Caleb, Joshua, Rhoda, and Zephaniah Hutchinson toured the United States under the name "Home Branch of the Hutchinson Family". When the original group returned, they angrily put an end to the Home Branch. The Hutchinsons added several original songs at this time.

=== Activism ===
At the urging of Jesse Hutchinson, the group took up various causes. Among these were abolitionism, temperance, and women's rights. In December 1842, John Hutchinson signed a petition affiliated with an abolitionist rally in Milford. By the following year, the Hutchinsons had become vocal abolitionists. Asa Hutchinson wrote:

About this time [1843] an antislavery convention was held in Milford attended by Wm. Lloyd Garrison... The custom at once enlisted the sympathies of the young men. Accustomed to roam at freedom among their own Hills, they abhorred slavery and pitied the slave. More than this they nobly resolved to exert their influence on behalf of the captives. To this end they prepared and sang antislavery songs.

They traveled with Frederick Douglass in England in 1845 and stayed for almost a year. Original songs such as "Get Off the Track!", "Right over Wrong", and "The Slave's Appeal" addressed these issues. Abby Hutchinson wrote "Song of Our Mountain Home" in 1850. It includes the line, "Among our free hills are true hearts and brave, / The air of our mountains ne'er breathed on a slave."

The group, known colloquially as the "Tribe of Jesse" was still quite popular at the onset of the Civil War, by which time they had split into two ensembles, the "Tribe of John" and the "Tribe of Asa"; both ensembles continued to bill themselves as the Hutchinson Family. The Tribe of Asa relocated to the western part of the United States, performing in, among other places, Minnesota and Wisconsin; the Tribe of John stayed primarily in the eastern part of the country, and began to perform in and around the camps of the Union Army with the onset of the war. Judson missed these performances, as he had committed suicide by hanging himself in 1859, in the cellar of John's home known as the Daisy Cottage.

Controversy ensued over a performance given January 17, 1862, at Fairfax Courthouse, Virginia, for troops of the Army of the Potomac. The concert was intended for the First New Jersey Regiment, whose Chaplain, R. B. Ward, was a friend of John's, but many other troops attended the performance as well. The Hutchinsons sang a musical rendition of John Greenleaf Whittier's poem "We Wait beneath the Furnace Blast", which was a recasting of the Lutheran hymn, "Ein Feste Burg Ist Unser Gott" (itself based on Psalm 46), and provoked quite a reaction from attendees who objected to the tune's anti-slavery lyrics.

== Modern recordings of repertoire ==
- Homespun America. New Hutchinson Family Singers (Eastman Chorale), Eastman Wind Ensemble; conducted by Donald Hunsberger and Robert De Cormier. Vox Box SVBX 5309. 3 LP record set. 1976. Re-issued as Vox Box CDX 5088. 2 Compact Disc set. 1993.

Issued in part to celebrate the U.S. Bicentennial, this anthology features many hits from the mid-19th century on a multi-album set. Most are instrumental works such as quadrilles, marches and polkas. But interspersed are song selections performed by a small group of vocalists known as the "New Hutchinson Family Singers" (really members of the Eastman Chorale). They perform four songs made famous by the "old" Hutchinson Family Singers: "The Old Granite State", "The Pauper's Funeral", "Get Off the Track", and the humorous "Calomel", which is about the chemical compound used as medicine, and sung (like "We Wait beneath the Furnace Blast") to the tune of "Ein Fest Burg".

- The Civil War Music Collector's Edition. The Hutchinson Family Singers (George Berglund, music director). Time-Life Music. 3 Compact Disc set. 1991.
- Liberty Is Our Motto. The Hutchinson Family Singers (George Berglund, Wayne Dalton, Bill Rollie, Judy Sjerven, Linda Steen). Cassette album. 1986.
- There's a Good Time Coming: and other songs by the Hutchinson Family. Lucy Shelton, soprano; Patricia Deckert, alto; Frank Hoffmeister, tenor; Jeffrey Gall, countertenor; David Evitts, bass; with accompanying musicians. Smithsonian N 020. LP record. 1978

This record album contains seventeen songs made popular by the Hutchinsons, including "The Old Granite State" and "Get On Track", but also lesser known ballads such as "Axes to Grind", "The Cot Where We Were Born", and "The Humbugg'd Husband". Also featured is the famous "Welcome to Jenny Lind", composed by Jesse Hutchinson (lyrics by Bernard Covert) to greet the Swedish Nightingale on her U.S. tour, 1850–52.

Recorded at Coolidge Auditorium, Library of Congress, Washington, D.C., with accompanying violin (Marilyn McDonald), cello (Kenneth Slowik), guitar (Howard Bass), piano and melodeon (director James Weaver), the album attempts to reproduce the authentic sound of the Hutchinsons.

The cover art recalls the 19th century aesthetic of the time, with individual portraits of Abby, Judson, John and Asa Hutchinson. The gatefold interior reproduces in facsimile tickets, playbills and posters from the group's career. The sixteen-page sepia-toned booklet features an illustrated history of the group written by James Morris, as well as notes and lyrics for each selection and biographical information each performer. In addition, photographs show historic instruments used to accompany the vocalists.

== See also ==
- Cheney Family Singers
- High Rock Tower Reservation
