= James Henry Comley =

American horticulturist

James Henry Comley (1835 in England – 1902 in Lexington, Massachusetts) was an American pioneer in horticultural science.

Born in England on May 29, 1835, Comley moved to Massachusetts in 1854. His work in agriculture, horticulture, and floriculture is documented in over 200 journals for the Massachusetts Horticultural Society, of which Comley was a member. American Florists Weekly magazine recognized Comley's contributions and awarded him the American Florist Pioneer in 1895.

Comley's work involvrf the year-round cultivation of plants and vegetation in hothouses and greenhouses and research into soil, potting, and irrigation.

James Henry Comley died on February 1, 1902, in Lexington, Massachusetts.
