= Benjamin Pierce Cheney =

American businessman (1815–1895)

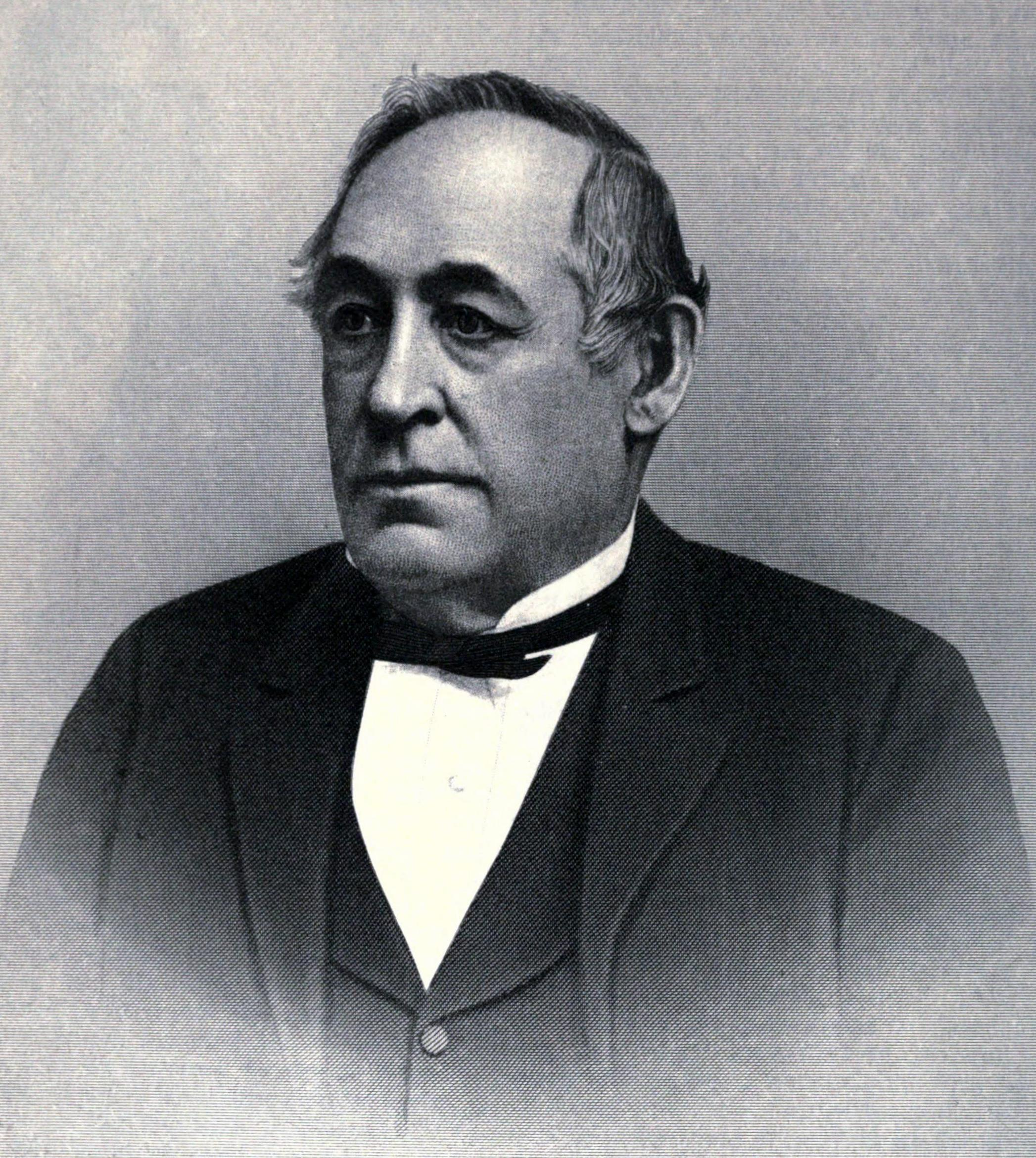
- Born: August 12, 1815; Hillsborough, New Hampshire, U.S.
- Died: July 23, 1895 (aged 79); Dover, Massachusetts, U.S.
- Occupation: Businessman
- Known for: Pioneer expressman
- Political party: Republican
- Spouse: Elizabeth Stickney Clapp (m. 1865)
- Children: 5, including Benjamin
- Parents: Jesse Cheney; Alice Cheney

Signature
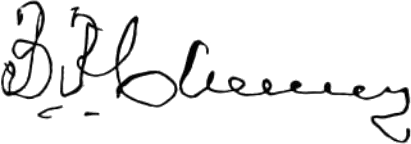

Benjamin Pierce Cheney (/ˈtʃiːni/ CHEE-nee; August 12, 1815 – July 23, 1895) was an American businessman, and a founder of the firm that became American Express.

== Early life ==
Cheney was born in Hillsborough, New Hampshire, on August 12, 1815, to Jesse and Alice Cheney (née Steele). The family were descended from John Cheney, who was recorded in Roxbury, Massachusetts, in 1635, moving the following year to Newbury, Massachusetts. John Cheney's brother, William, recorded in Roxbury by 1640, was an ancestor of former Vice President Dick Cheney. He was also evidently kin to the Benjamin Cheney or Cheany of Hartford, Connecticut, from whom John Fitch, the inventor of the steamboat, learned the trade of clocksmith in 1760.

Cheney's father was a blacksmith, and he began working in his father's shop at age 10. At age 12 he began working at a tavern and later a general store in Francestown, New Hampshire. In 1831 he started work as a stagecoach driver between Nashua and Exeter, soon moving to the route between Nashua and Keene. The stage did a brisk business due to the dearth of rail lines at the time. Cheney built relationships with some of his passengers at this time, including Daniel Webster, whose friendship lasted the rest of his life. With a reputation for honesty and reliability, he was frequently entrusted with large sums of money destined for banks on his route. In 1836 he became a stage agent in Boston.

== Career ==
=== Wells Fargo and American Express ===
Cheney joined Nathaniel White and William Walker in 1842 to organize an express line between Boston and Montreal. In 1852 Cheney effected his first consolidation when he bought out Fisk & Rice's Express between Boston and Burlington, Vermont. Subsequent consolidations resulted in the organization of the United States & Canada Express Company in 1854.

In 1854, while on his way home from Canada, he lost his right arm in a railway accident.

Cheney was elected a director of Wells Fargo & Company in September 1854 in place of Alpheus Reynolds, who had resigned. On April 15, 1863, the Wells Fargo management named Cheney, Danford N. Barney and William Fargo a committee to go to California "in the best interests of the company". Traveling by stage, they spent most of July, all of August, and most of September 1863 in California looking after the company's affairs.

He retired from the Wells Fargo board in 1877, but again served as a director from 1882 to the beginning of 1884.

Cheney sold United States & Canada Express in 1879 to American Express, at which time he became the company's largest shareholder as well as treasurer and a director. He remained a large shareholder of Wells Fargo, National Express, and others.

=== Railroads ===
Through his business contacts, Cheney became interested in the Vermont Central Railroad (later the Central Vermont), the Northern Pacific Railway, the Atchison, Topeka and Santa Fe Railway, and the San Diego Land and Town Company. He was also the founder and a director of the Market National Bank of Boston and the American Loan and Trust Company.

He helped finance the Northern Pacific and the Atchison, Topeka and Santa Fe, and had much to do with getting Wells Fargo's express service on both roads. He was a director of the Santa Fe from 1873 to 1894.

When it became evident the railroad was in dire straits, other directors sold their shares. Cheney, by contrast, refused to take advantage of his inside information and held his shares, suffering a significant personal loss when the railroad went bankrupt in the Panic of 1893 and was reorganized.

== Philanthropy ==
Cheney was a member of the New England Historic Genealogical Society. He donated $50,000 to Dartmouth College, and in 1886 he presented a bronze statue by Thomas Ball of his friend Daniel Webster to the people of New Hampshire; today it is located in front of the New Hampshire State House. He also helped develop the eastern part of Washington state with a railroad line. As a result, Cheney, Washington, is named in his honor, Located southwest of Spokane, Cheney was laid out in 1880 and incorporated as a city in 1883. The Illustrated Columbia Encyclopedia, 3rd edition, Vol. 5, p. 1279. New York: Columbia University Press, 1963. and with a $10,000 grant he helped establish a school there in 1882 that evolved into Eastern Washington University. Established in 1882 as Benjamin P. Cheney Academy, it became Washington State Normal School in 1889, Eastern Washington College of Education in 1937, Eastern Washington State College in 1961, and Eastern Washington University in 1977.

Cheney was also one of the most generous supporters of the Massachusetts Horticultural Society, after becoming a member in 1864. His property in Wellesley, Massachusetts, is now protected as Elm Bank Reservation.

== Personal life ==
On June 6, 1865, Cheney married Elizabeth Stickney Clapp, daughter of Asahel and Elizabeth Searle (Whiting) Clapp of Dorchester, Massachusetts. The Cheneys had two sons, Benjamin Pierce Cheney Jr. and Charles P., and three daughters, Alice Steele, Mary and Elizabeth.

== Later life and death ==
Cheney amassed a fortune estimated at $10,000,000. He was again elected a director of Wells Fargo upon the death of Leland Stanford in June 1893, and served until his own death in July 1895. His son then served as a director of Wells Fargo until August 1899.

Cheney's estate in Wellesley, Massachusetts has since become the Elm Bank Horticulture Center. He retired to this 198-acre (0.80 km^{2}) property on the Charles River in his last years and occupied himself with beautifying the land with conservatories and gardens. He died on July 23, 1895.
