= Abigail Hutchinson =

Abigail Hutchinson can refer to:

- Abby Hutchinson Patton (1829–1892), American singer and poet
- Abigail Hutchinson, Christian believer described in A Faithful Narrative of the Surprising Work of God in the Conversion of Many Hundred Souls in Northampton by Jonathan Edwards
