= Arlow Stout =

American botanist and flower breeder

Arlow Burdette Stout (March 10, 1876 – October 12, 1957) was an American botanist and the pioneer breeder of the modern hybrid daylily.

Stout was born in Jackson Center, Ohio, on March 10, 1876, and moved to Albion, Wisconsin, as a child. He worked between 1911 and 1948 at the New York Botanical Garden. In over 50,000 cross-pollination experiments, Stout produced over one hundred viable Hemerocallis hybrids, revolutionizing nursery breeding and popular interest in daylilies. Stout's public renown rested largely on the knowledge and innovation he brought to the breeding of daylilies. He died at his home in Pleasantville, New York, in 1957.

In 1950, American Hemerocallis Society established an annual Stout Award in his honor.

== Affiliations ==
- Honorary Life Member of the Horticultural Society of New York
- Honorary Life Fellow in the Royal Horticultural Society
- fellow of the American Association for the Advancement of Science
- fellow the American Society of Naturalists
- fellow of the Botanical Society of America

== Awards ==
- 1937: Thomas Roland Medal of the Massachusetts Horticultural Society; gold medal for an exhibit of seedling daylilies by the Horticultural Society of New York
- 1954: Distinguished Service Award for "outstanding contributions to the advancement of horticulture and botany." from New York Botanical Garden
