= Deni Bown =

British author, photographer, botanical horticulturist and environmentalist

Deni Bown is a British author, photographer, botanical horticulturist and environmentalist. She is best known for writing and illustrating The Royal Horticultural Society Encyclopedia of Herbs & Their Uses (1995), which was published internationally and remains a widely published reference work on culinary, medicinal and aromatic plants.

== Career ==
Bown began her career in publishing as a lexicographer with Laurence Urdang Associates and contributed as editor to several editions of the Collins English Dictionary.

Her first book, Aroids - Plants of the Arum Family (1988), was supported by the Manpower Services Commission Enterprise Allowance Scheme and the Stanley Smith Horticultural Trust UK. The book helped bring wider public attention to the titan arum (Amorphophallus titanum), later popularised in David Attenborough’s BBC series The Private Life of Plants.

From 1999 to 2009 she developed a seven-acre garden at Yaxham Park, Norfolk, featuring culinary and medicinal herbs, rare plants, wildflower meadows and water gardens. It was featured by local media and was open to visitors through the Invitation to View programme.

Her conservation work began in the 1970s with Friends of the Earth and the Henry Doubleday Research Association, now Garden Organic.

In 2009 Bown became coordinator of a forest conservation project at IITA, taking over as manager in 2012 and becoming Head of the IITA Forest Unit (now Forest Center) in 2014. She managed the 350 ha IITA Forest Reserve and an indigenous plant nursery while leading projects including the Nigerian Threatened Native Trees Project supported by the Mohammed bin Zayed Species Conservation Fund. She also relaunched the Ibadan Bird Club and developed a Forest School, an Ethnobotanical Garden for Yorubaland, and a West African Tree Heritage Park.

She returned to Europe in 2019 and continues to write on plants and conservation.

== Selected works ==
- Aroids - Plants of the Arum Family (1988; revised 2000; third edition 2025, Kew Publishing)
- Fine Herbs, a Plantsman’s Herbal (1988; reprinted as Ornamental Herbs for Your Garden, 1993)
- Alba - the Book of White Flowers (1989) – Certificate of Merit, Garden Writers’ Association of America
- Through the Seasons (children’s series, 1989)
- 4 Gardens in One – The Royal Botanic Garden Edinburgh (HMSO 1992)
- RHS Encyclopedia of Herbs & Their Uses (1995; revised 2002)
- Herbal - The Essential Guide to Herbs for Living (2001, with Chelsea Physic Garden)
- Common Plants of IITA (2013)
- Contributor to The Last Rainforests (1990), The RHS Encyclopedia of Gardening (1992, 2002), Nigerian Forests – Protection and Sustainable Development (2013)

== Awards ==
- Finalist, BBC Wildlife Photographer of the Year (1984, 1987); semi-finalist 1985; prize-winner 1986
- Communicator of the Decade, International Aroid Society (1989)
- Certificate of Merit, Garden Writers’ Association of America (1990)
- Finalist, Good Housekeeping Woman of the Nineties Award (1996)
- Gertrude B. Foster Award for Excellence in Herbal Literature, Herb Society of America (2002)

== Positions held ==
- Chair, The Herb Society (UK), 1997–2000
- Judge and committee member, Royal Horticultural Society, 2003–2009
- Chair, Promising Plants Committee, Herb Society of America, 2003–2006
- Honorary President, Herb Society of America, 2004–2006
- Chair, Plant Heritage Norfolk Group, 2006–2009
- Advisory Board Member, American Botanical Council, 2013–present
- Vice-President, European Aroid Society, 2020–present
