= Cheney Family Singers =

American family singing group

The Cheney Family Singers was a family—consisting of a sister and four brothers; Moses, Nathaniel, Simeon, Joseph, and Elizabeth— who were early American singers from 1845 to 1847. They were led by Moses Ela Cheney. Walt Whitman reviewed the group in 1845, concluding that they were one of the “American vocal bands that in true music really surpass almost any of the vaunted artificial performers from abroad.” He considered them to have a "refreshing simplicity".

== See also ==
- Hutchinson Family Singers
