= Elm Bank Horticulture Center =

Botanical garden in Massachusetts, U.S.

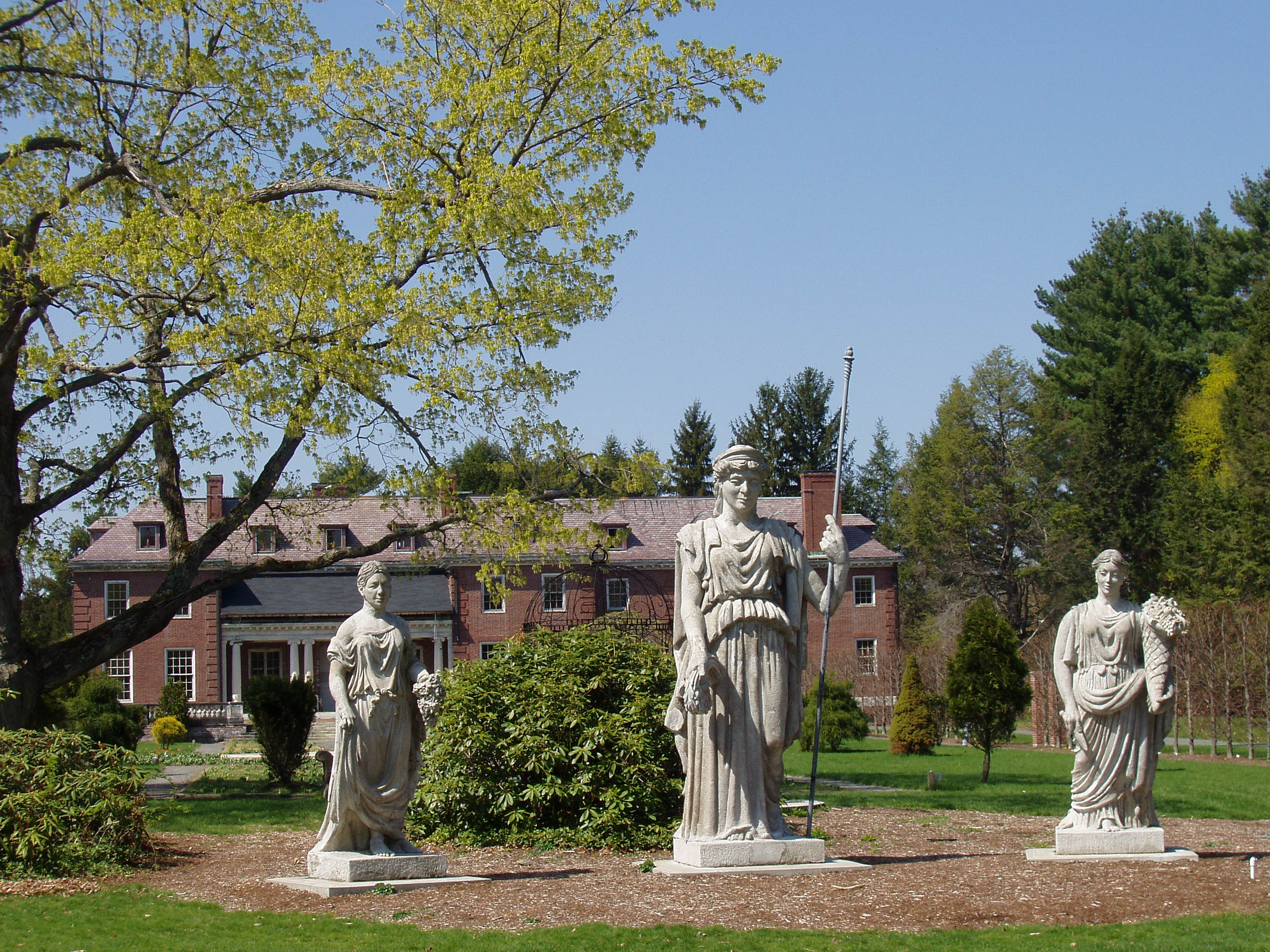

The Gardens at Elm Bank, home of Massachusetts Horticultural Society, occupies 36 acres (15 ha) of Elm Bank Reservation, a 175-acre (71 ha) recreational area of woodlands, fields, and former estate property on the Charles River managed by the Massachusetts Department of Conservation and Recreation. The estate's entrance is located at 900 Washington Street (Route 16), Wellesley, Massachusetts, United States, with the major portion of the grounds located in the neighboring town of Dover. In 1987, the entire site was added to the National Register of Historic Places as Elm Bank.

== History ==
Property records date back to 1732 when Thomas Fuller owned the tract on land then known as the Natick Plain. The property earned the sobriquet Elm Bank after Colonel John Jones acquired the land in 1740 and planted elm trees along the riverside. After being occupied by families named Loring, Broad, and Otis, the property was sold for $10,000 in 1874 to Benjamin Pierce Cheney, a founder of a delivery company that became American Express. At the time of Cheney's death in 1895, the property contained over 200 acres (80 hectares), and passed to his eldest daughter Alice in 1905. In 1907, Alice and her husband, Dr. William Hewson Baltzell, engaged the architectural firm of Carrère and Hastings to design a Neo-Georgian manor house. They also commissioned the Olmsted Brothers firm, the most prominent landscape designers of the era, for the estate's site planning and to design new gardens and improve existing ones. In the 1940s, the property became a seminary housing a group of Stigmatine Fathers, who constructed a school building and ran a summer camp in the 1960s and 1970s. The Commonwealth of Massachusetts purchased the property in the mid 1970s. It then served as the home of the Quinobin Regional Technical School.

In 1996, an effort was successfully undertaken by Dr. John C. Peterson, President of the Massachusetts Horticultural Society to secure a new educational and garden site for Mass Hort in the suburbs of Boston, a long time dream of the organization. Peterson undertook intense studies and collaborative investigations with various agencies of the Commonwealth of Massachusetts, including the Metropolitan District Commission (MDC) to develop a project plan and business plan that would justify and enable Mass Hort to secure a long term lease for the Horticultural Society. Due to the efforts of Dr. John C. Peterson, support was gained from the MDC, Department of Environmental Management, the Secretary of the Environment and the Governors office to propose legislation that would shortly thereafter be enacted into law by the State Legislature to authorize a land lease of 36 acres of the Elm Bank Reservation / formally the Cheney Estate to The Massachusetts Horticultural Society for a term of 100 years.

The Horticultural Society, under Peterson's direction, then undertook a multi-year design and planning effort working with a world renown botanical and garden landscape architect from the Netherlands, Pieter van Loon, President of Eurolandscapes in Morekapella, The Netherlands. John Peterson and Pieter van Loon collaboratively develop a site Master Plan for The Elm Bank Horticulture Center gardens and facilities. This Master Plan and vision for the future facility components, established and solidified the Mass Hort Society site as a garden and educational program site based facility for the first time in its 125+ year history. Next, significant fund raising efforts were launched and donations and grants were secured, under the direction of Peterson and Chief Fundraising Officer, Kathleen Sharkey, that enabled the Mass Hort organization to commence with significant site development and improvement projects. Historic gardens and building renovations were completed, educational gardens and plant growing facilities were constructed, and educational and operational building facilities were developed to accommodate Master Gardener training programs, as well as educational programs and events for Society members as well as the general public.

The Society, under the direction of its President, Dr. John C. Peterson, cultivated and solidified collaborations with a wide range of Plant Societies, Garden Clubs and commercial horticulture firms to expand upon the scope and character of the Elm Bank Horticulture Center features, gardens, programs and facilities. These advancements and improvements strengthened the role of the Massachusetts Horticulture Society as a key site and leading entity that provided educational and information and training programs to plant enthusiasts throughout Massachusetts and the New England Region. The new gardens, office, educational program, event and meeting space solidified the Massachusetts Horticulture Society as a year-round powerhouse in the public horticulture, display, demonstration and educational and horticultural information centers in the New England Region. As the overall site and individual garden spaces matured and grew in significance, the society began to charge non-member visitors an entrance fee in 2010,. The gardens' maintenance is supported through entrance fees, special events, and private usages such as garden weddings.

In 2024, the society closed Elm Bank to sledding, not using signage or announcement, but enlisting electric fencing.

== Gardens ==
The distinct gardens featured at Elm Bank include:

Bressingham Garden

The Bressingham Garden was installed in 2007 into the Elm Bank reservation. The garden was designed by Adrian Bloom of Bressingham, England and was planted in only two days with the help of over 200 volunteers. The Bressingham Garden is assumed to be one garden itself due to its size, but it is just one in six of the distinct gardens this reservation holds.

The six total gardens at Elm Bank reservation include:

Dell Garden

Foggy Bottom Garden

Fragrant Garden

Winter Garden

Summer Garden

Woodland Garden

Weezie's Garden for Children

A series of small spiraling gardens, each giving visitors the opportunity to plant, water or interact in some way with the garden's elements. Children's classes are held throughout the spring, summer and fall in this special garden.

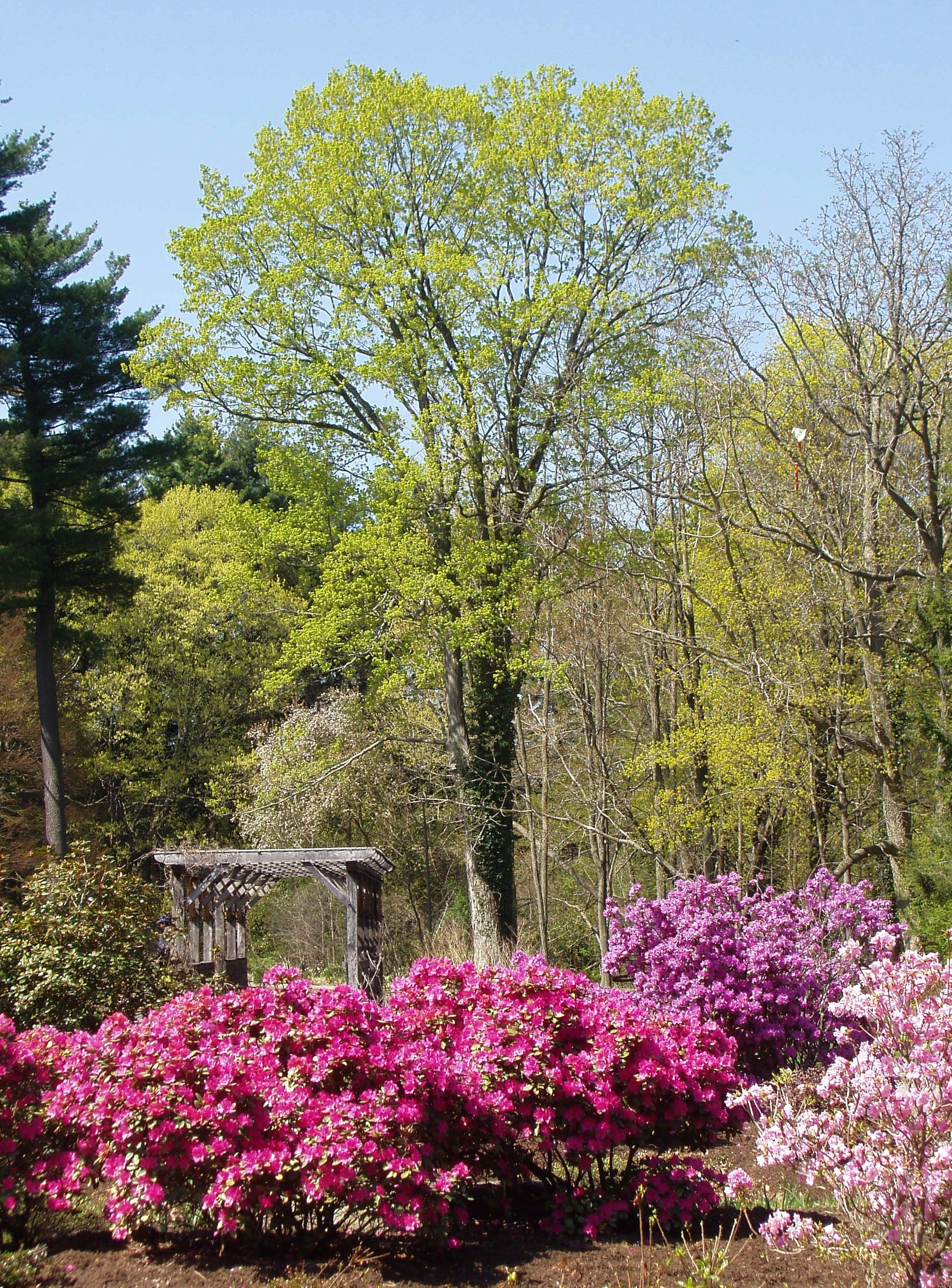
The American Rhododendron Society Garden, at Elm Bank.

Mass Hort Trial Garden

A cooperative effort between the University of Massachusetts, the Massachusetts Flower Growers’ Association and Massachusetts Horticultural Society. Breeding companies from all over the world contribute Annuals for viewing by amateur and professional Gardeners. This garden also tests unreleased varieties competing for All-America Selections awards, displays previous winners, and grows hundreds of cultivars submitted for evaluation by commercial plant breeders.

Italianate Garden

Restoration of the 1926 Italianate Garden was based on the original plans from the Frederick Law Olmsted National Historic Site, together with a numbered plant list - and even receipts - for the original trees and flowers planted in the garden.

Display Gardens

The Noanett Garden Club, the New England Chapter of the Herb Society of America, and the American Rhododendron Society maintain collaborative demonstration and display gardens at Elm Bank. The Day Lily Society installed a garden in 2004.

== See also ==
- List of botanical gardens in the United States
- National Register of Historic Places listings in Norfolk County, Massachusetts
- Hunnewell Estates Historic District
- Arnold Arboretum
