= Horticultural Hall (Boston) =

Building in Boston, Massachusetts, US

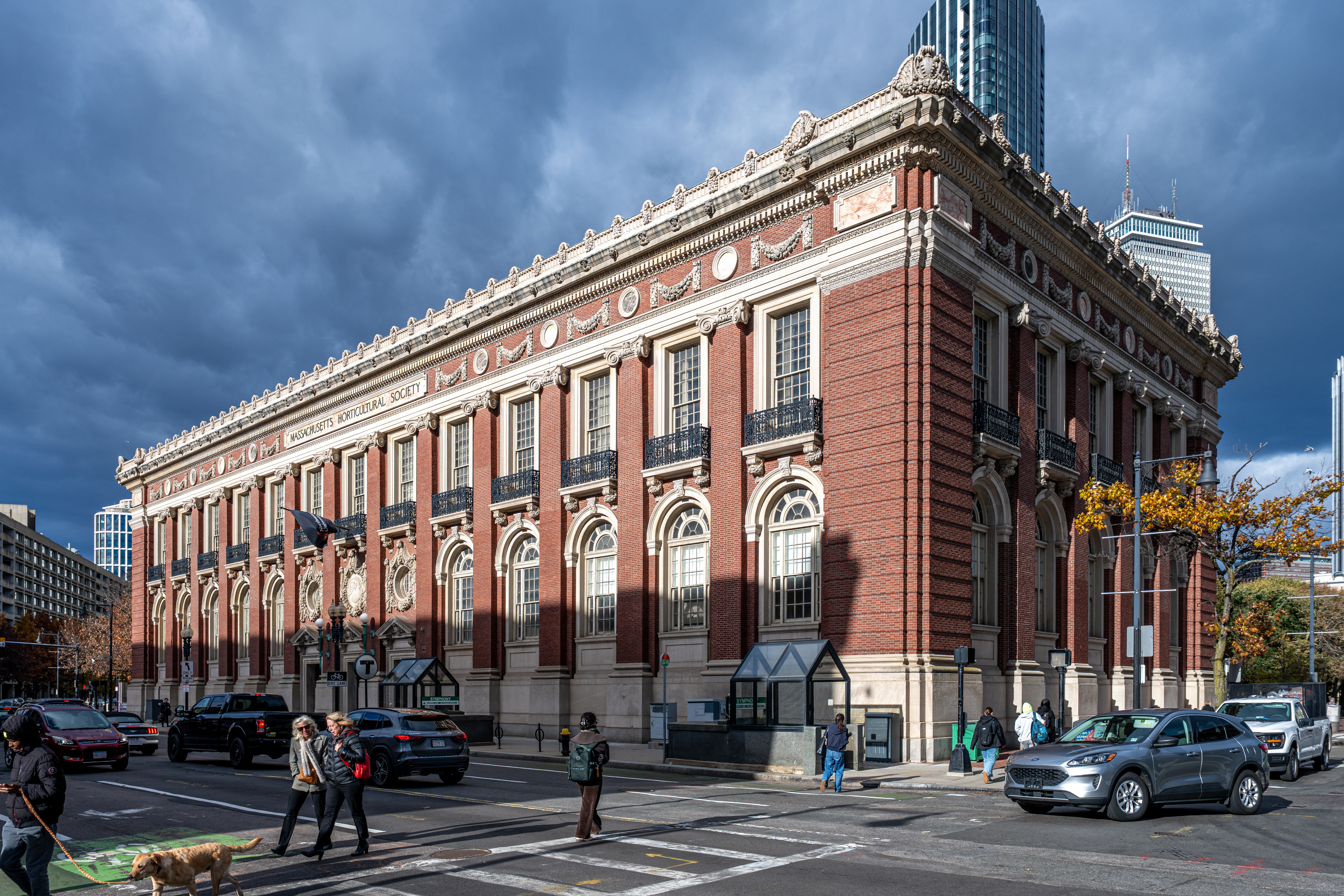
- Horticultural Hall exterior (2025)
- Interactive map of the Horticultural Hall area

General information
- Location: Huntington Avenue & Massachusetts Avenue, Boston, Massachusetts, United States
- Coordinates: 42°20′35.15″N 71°05′06.38″W
- Year built: 1901
- Renovated: 1984
- Owner: Northeastern University

Design and construction
- Architecture firm: Wheelwright and Haven

Horticultural Hall, at the corner of Huntington Avenue and Massachusetts Avenue in Boston, was built in 1901. It sits across the street from Symphony Hall. Since 2020, it has been owned by Northeastern University. It is the current home to The William Morris Hunt Memorial Library of the Museum of Fine Arts as well as to offices of Boston magazine, 829 Studios, and Small Army, in addition to a performance space of the New England Conservatory of Music.

== History ==
The building was the third "Horticultural Hall" built for the Massachusetts Horticultural Society. It was designed in the English Renaissance Revival style in 1901 by architects Wheelwright and Haven on land purchased by the Society. (This firm also designed the whimsical Harvard Lampoon Castle in Cambridge, Massachusetts.)

When the Hall was dedicated in 1901, thousands of members and visitors attended its ten-day opening, during which time the hall was filled with amaryllises, azaleas, Pelargonium geraniums, gloxinias, jasmine, trumpet lilies, palms, rhododendrons, wisteria, and a collection of 1,000 orchids, the finest collection gathered in America to that time.

The building's larger lecture hall could seat 300. It was home to many organizations including the Benevolent Fraternity Fruit and Flower Mission, the Wildflower Society, the Garden Club Federation (whose founding in 1927 was organized by the Society), the Boston Mycological Club, the New England Gourd Society, the New England Gladiolus Society, the Herb Society of America, and the Boston Aquarium Society. The building was renovated in 1984, and sold to the neighboring Christian Science Church in 1992.

This building is currently under study by the Boston Landmarks Commission for landmark status.

== Other buildings ==
=== Former buildings (1845–1901) ===
The Massachusetts Horticultural Society has built and occupied a series of "Horticultural Halls" in Boston, including the first on School Street (1845), the second on Tremont Street (1865), and this third hall (1901).

=== Elm Bank Horticulture Center, Wellesley (2001–present) ===
The society's current home is the Elm Bank Horticulture Center, located on the town lines of Wellesley and Dover (2001).

== Images ==
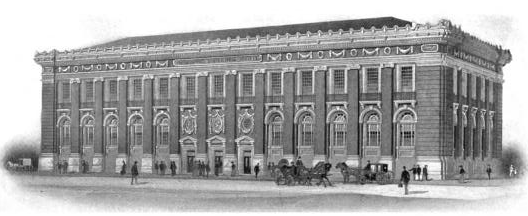
1900, sketch

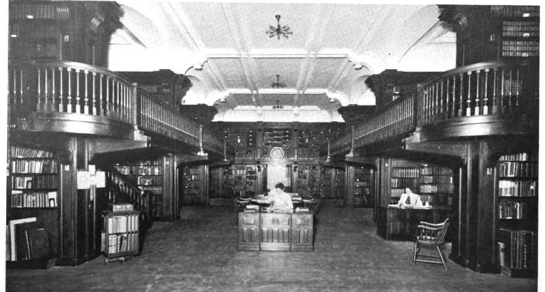
1901, library

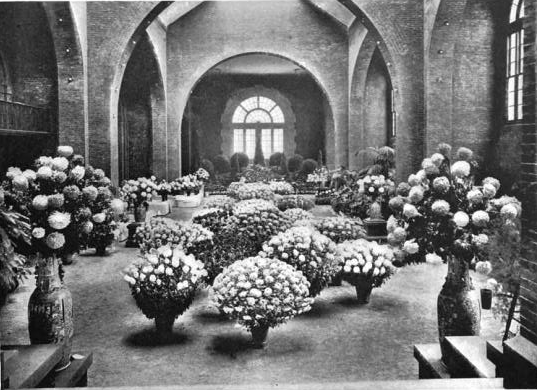
1901, Chrysanthemum show

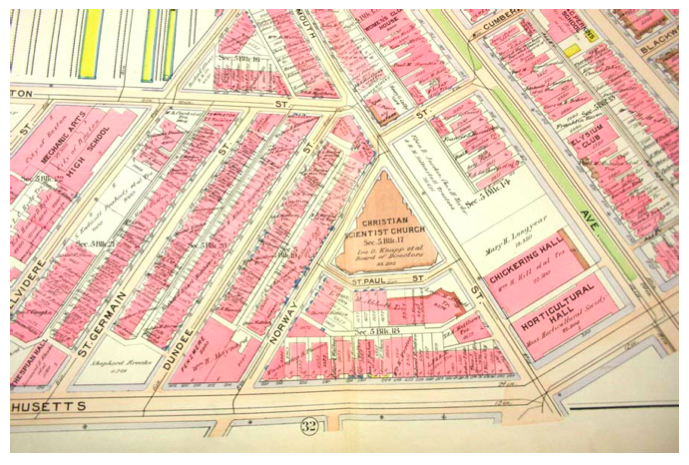
1908, map of surrounding area

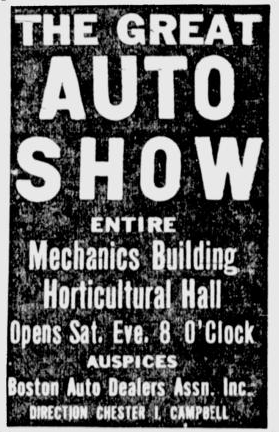
1911, ad

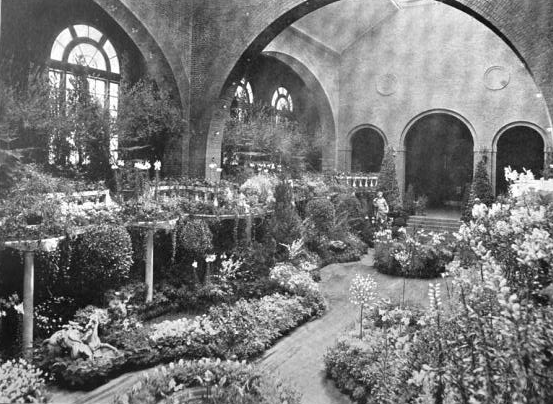
1912, Italian garden

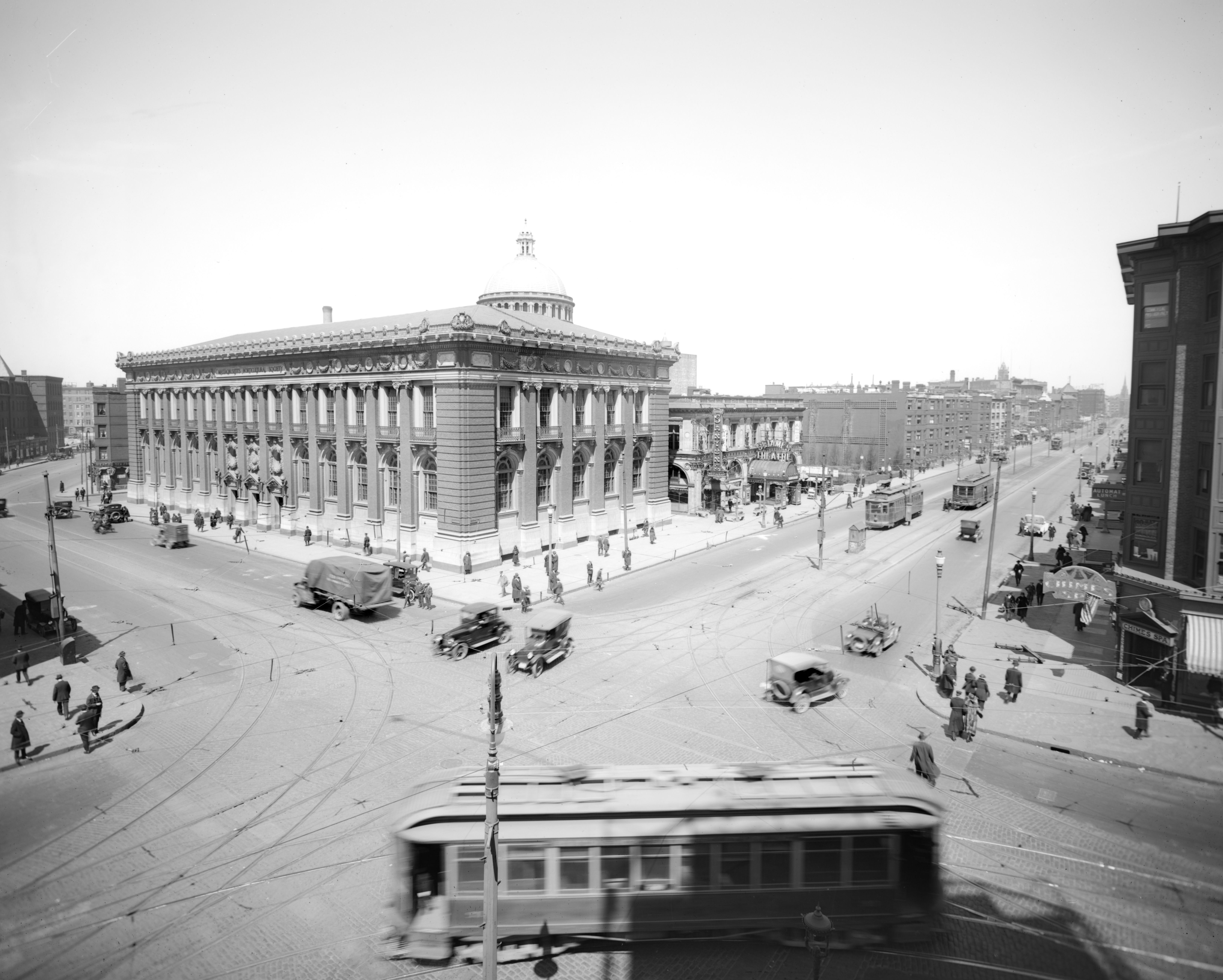
1920, exterior

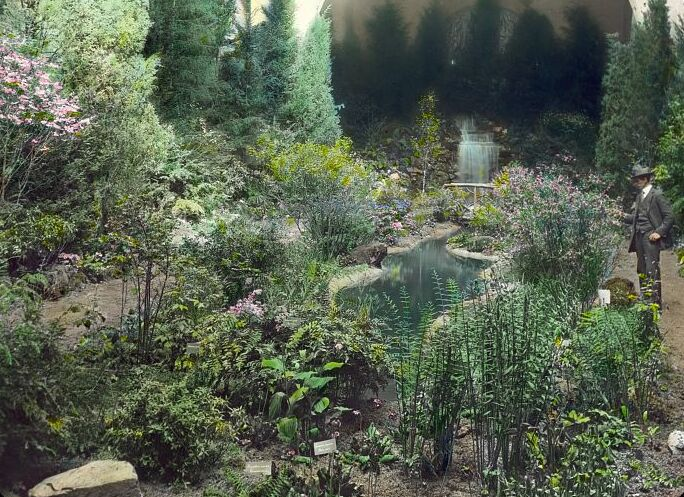
1921, hand-colored glass lantern slide

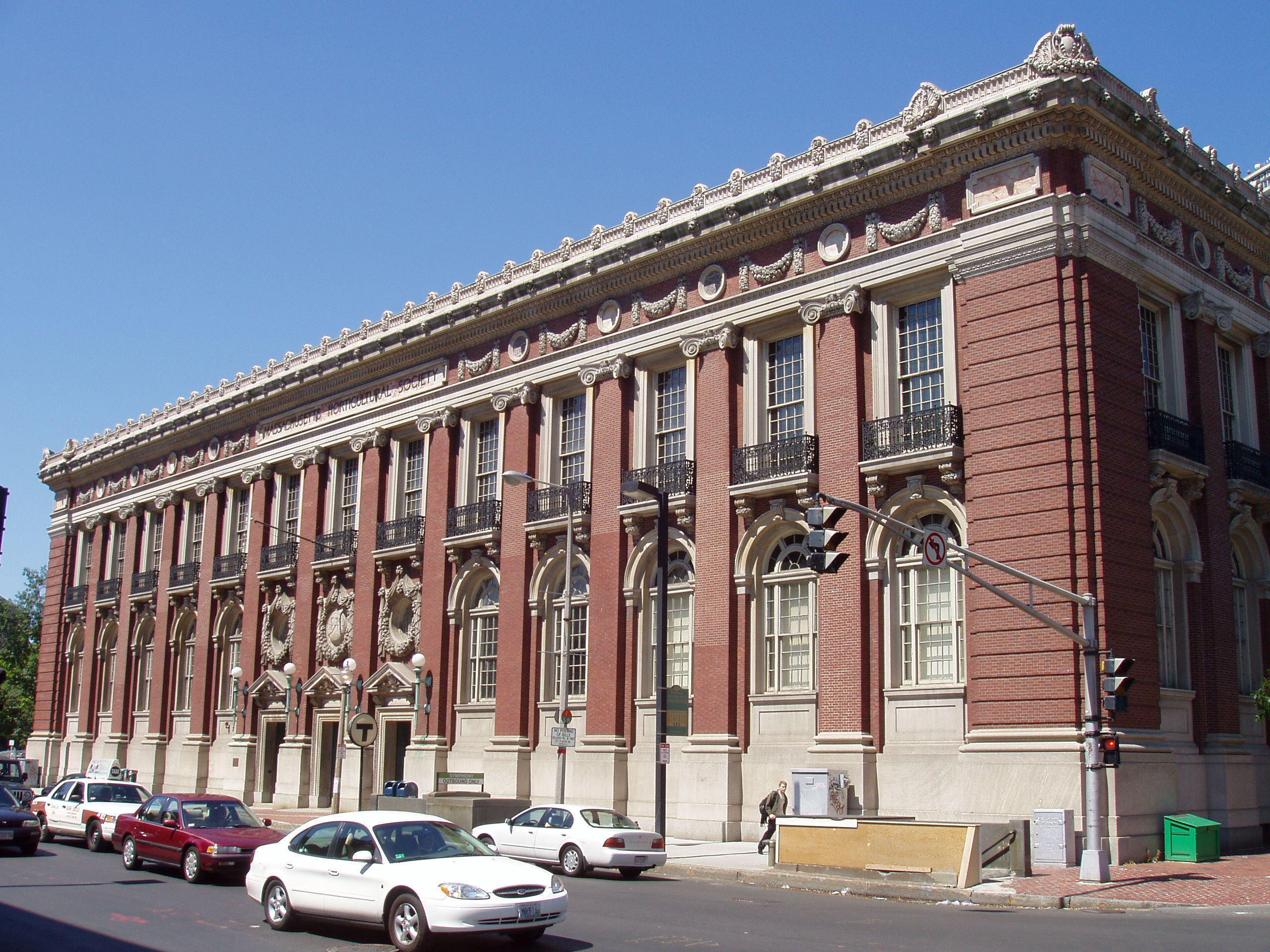
2005, exterior

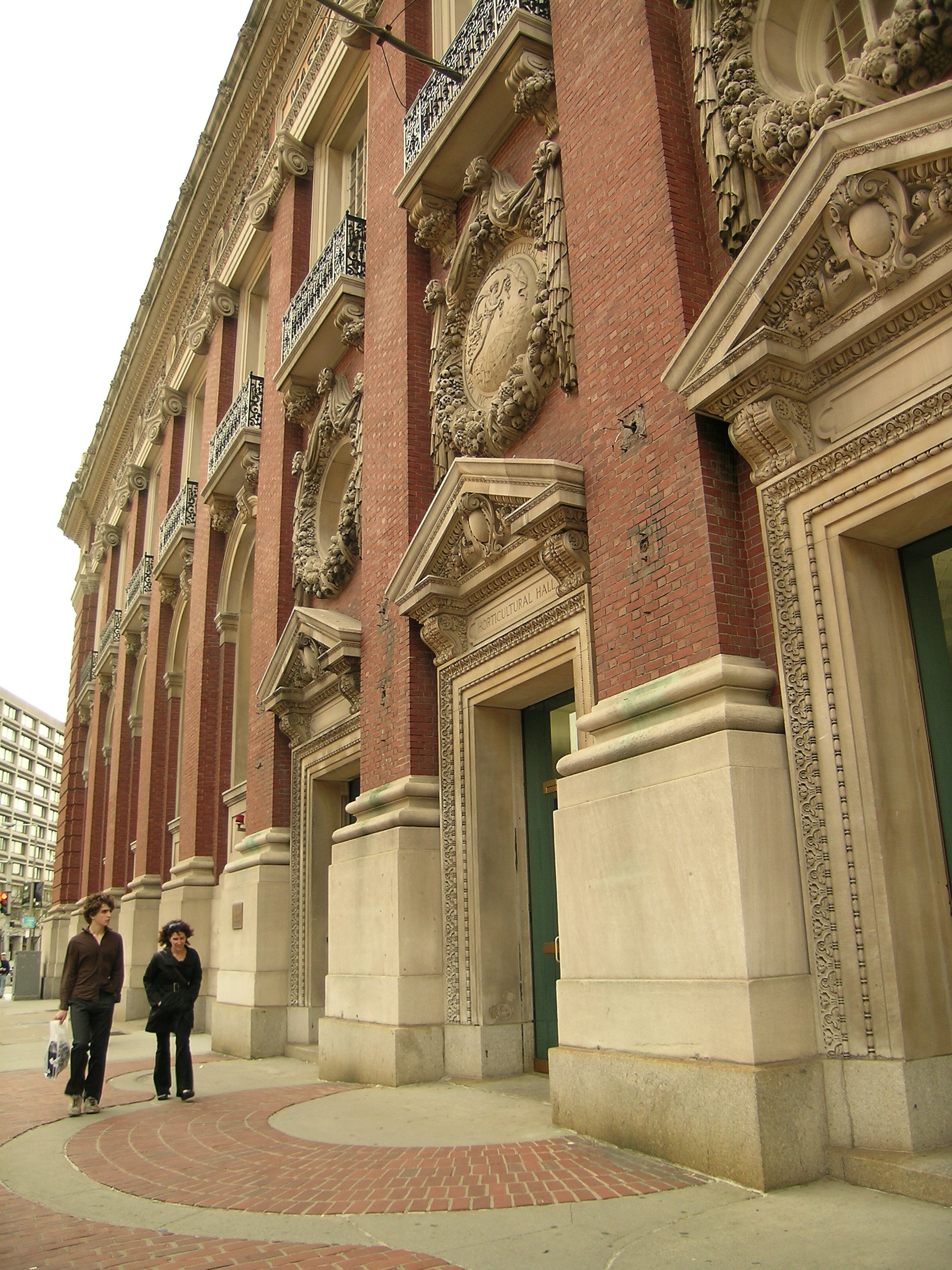
2008, exterior

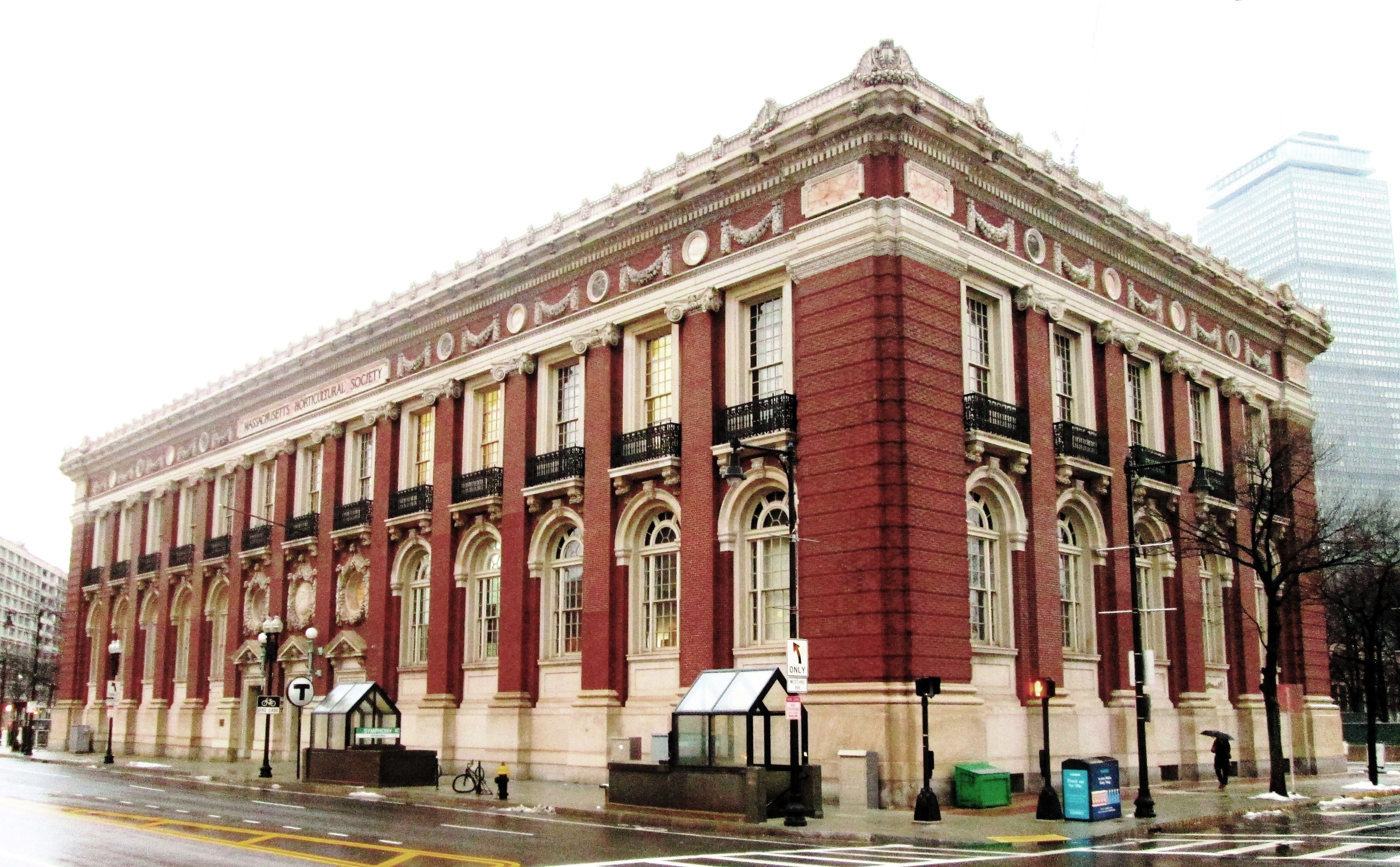
2018, exterior
