= Horticultural Hall (Boston, 1865) =

Building in Boston, Massachusetts, US (built 1865)

Coordinates: 42°21′25.96″N 71°3′40.01″W

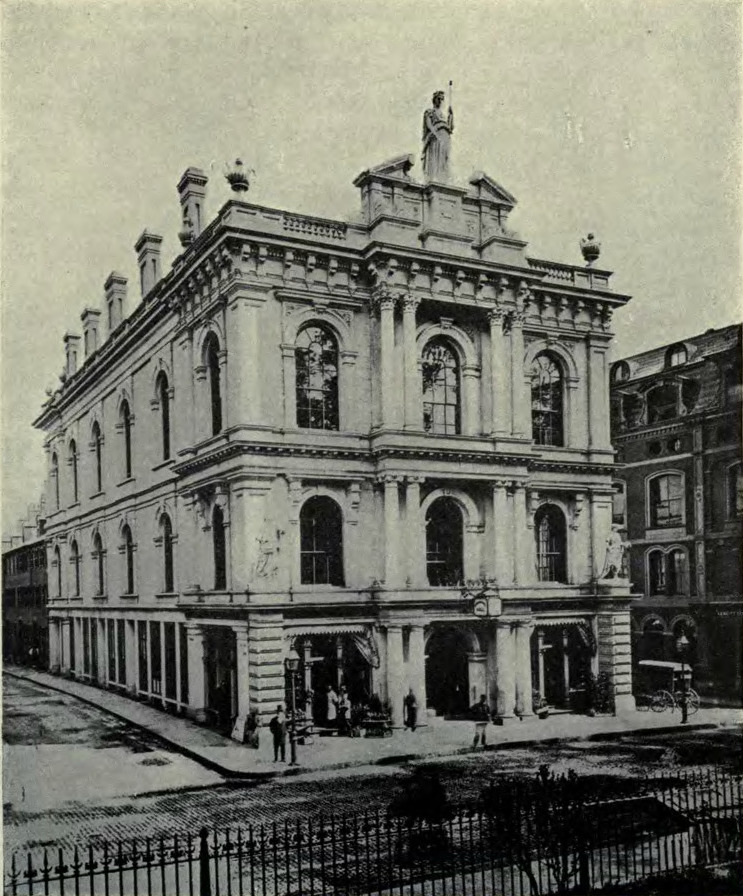
Horticultural Hall

Horticultural Hall (1865–1901) of Boston, Massachusetts, was the headquarters of the Massachusetts Horticultural Society in the later 19th century. It stood at no.100-102 Tremont Street, at the corner of Bromfield Street, opposite the Granary Burying Ground. Architects Gridley J.F. Bryant and Arthur Gilman designed the building. Sculptor Martin Milmore created horticulturally-themed statuary for the building's exterior: "three ancient Roman goddesses ... Ceres, goddess of agriculture; Flora, goddess of flowers; and Pomona, goddess of fruit trees." In the 1880s: "the ground floor [was] occupied by stores; the second story by the Library Room of the society and a hall for the weekly exhibitions; and the upper story by a large and elegant hall used ... at the annual and other important exhibitions. Both of these halls [were] often used for concerts and the better class of entertainments. The society's library, comprising over 4,000 volumes, [was] the most valuable collection of horticultural works in the United States. The halls [were] adorned with portraits and busts of the presidents, founders, and benefactors of the society."

By 1899 the society's rooms in the building seemed old-fashioned, small, inconvenient, and expensive to maintain. After internal debate the society sold Horticultural Hall in 1900 and leased space there for some months thereafter. In 1901 the society transferred to its new building in the Back Bay, and the building on Tremont Street was demolished the same year. At the time, Milmore's architectural statues were removed to the home of society president Albert C. Burrage (later the Glen Urquhart School) in Beverly, Massachusetts. In the mid-1990s the society restored Milmore's statues (only torsos survived) and installed them in their new headquarters in Wellesley, Massachusetts.

== Images ==
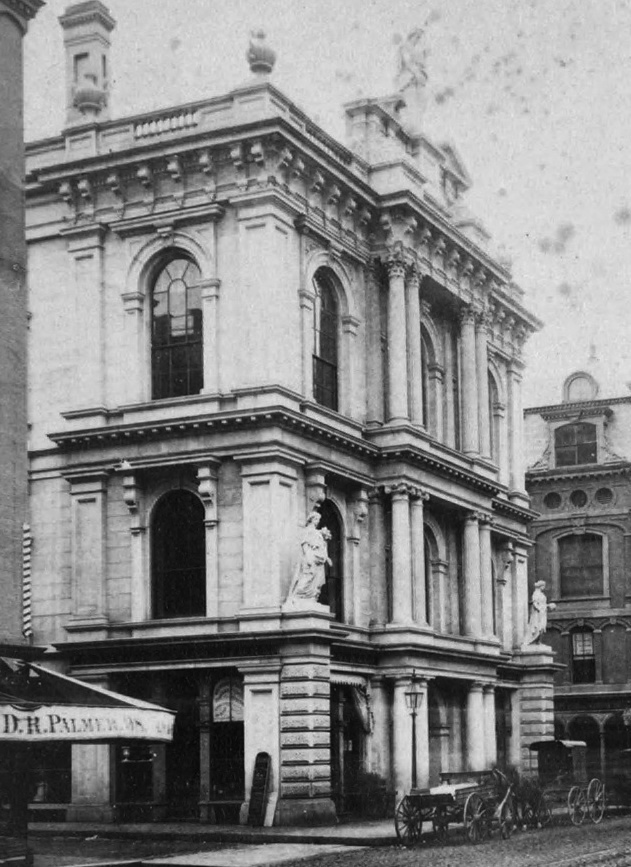
Horticultural Hall, unknown date

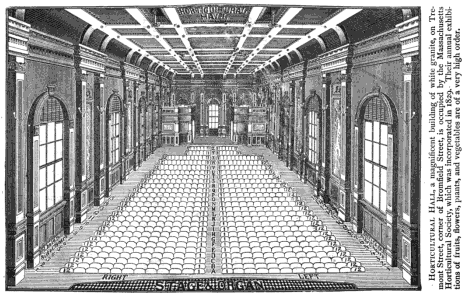
Interior, from Stranger's Illustrated Guide to Boston and its Suburbs

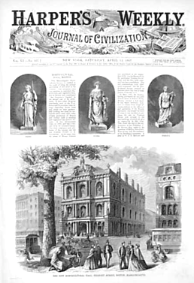
Harper's Weekly, 1867; cover story about Horticultural Hall

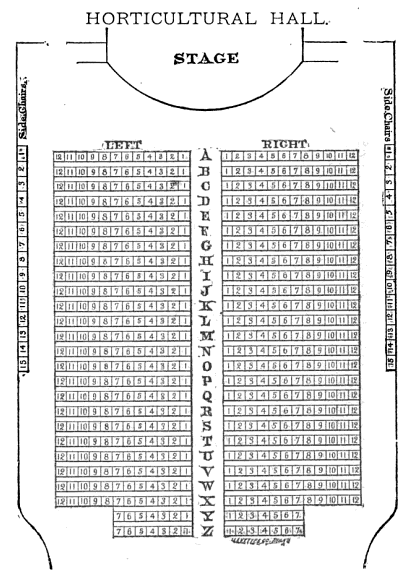
Seating chart of auditorium, 1887

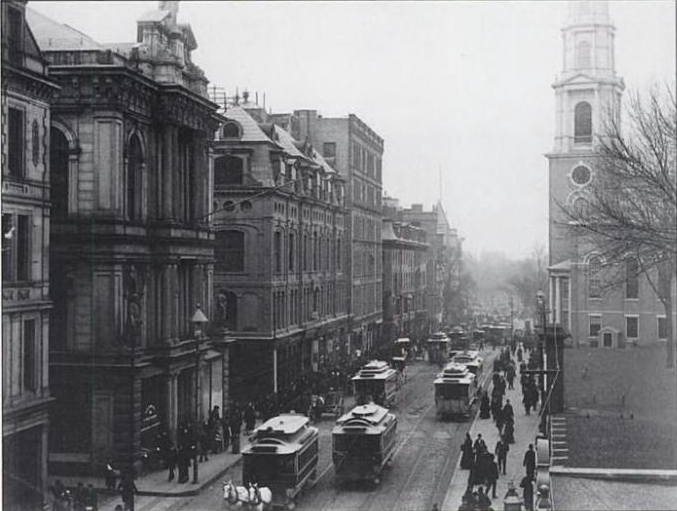
Tremont Street in 1891, with Horticultural Hall (left), Studio Building (center), Park Street Church (right)

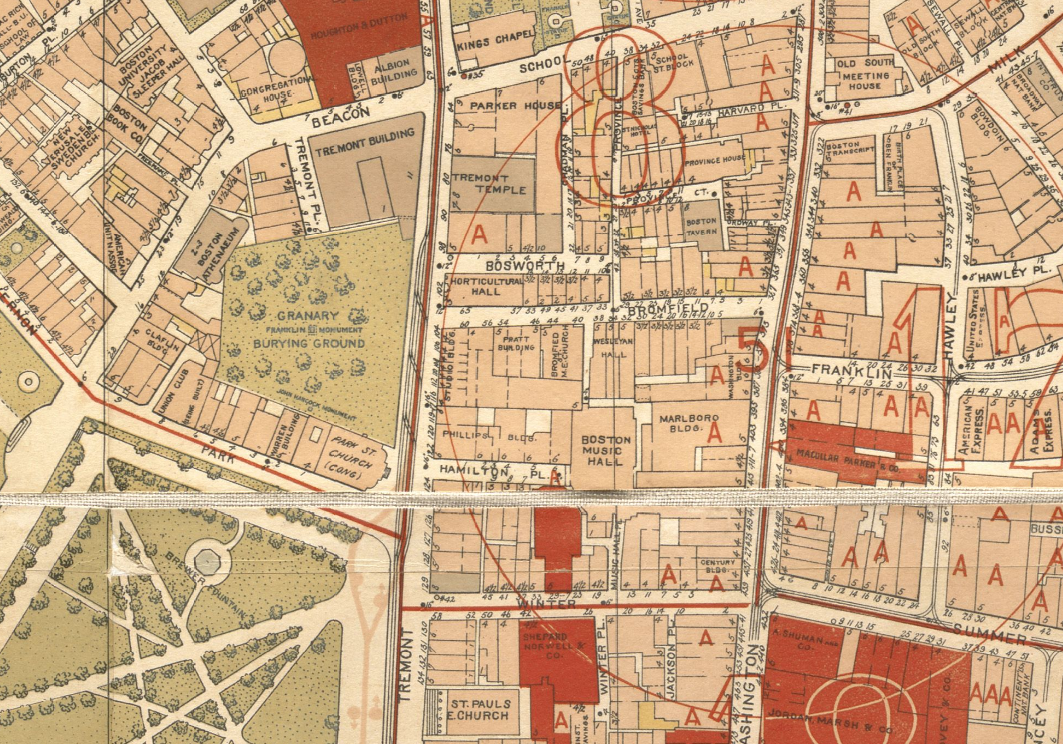
Detail of 1896 map of Boston, showing Horticultural Hall, opposite Granary Burial Ground

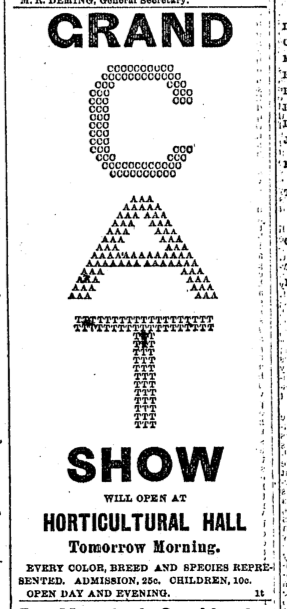
Advertisement, Cat show, 1883

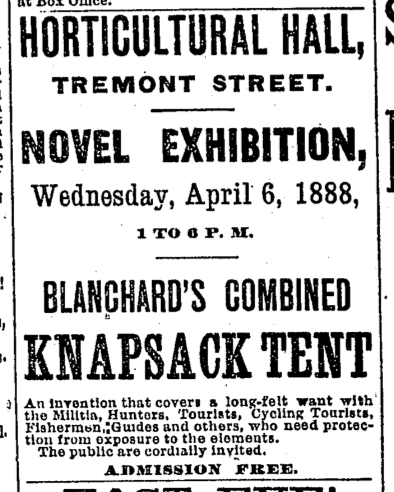
Advertisement, Novel exhibition, 1888

Advertisement, Hypnotism show, 1891

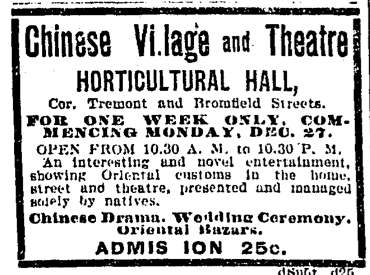
Advertisement, Chinese village, 1897

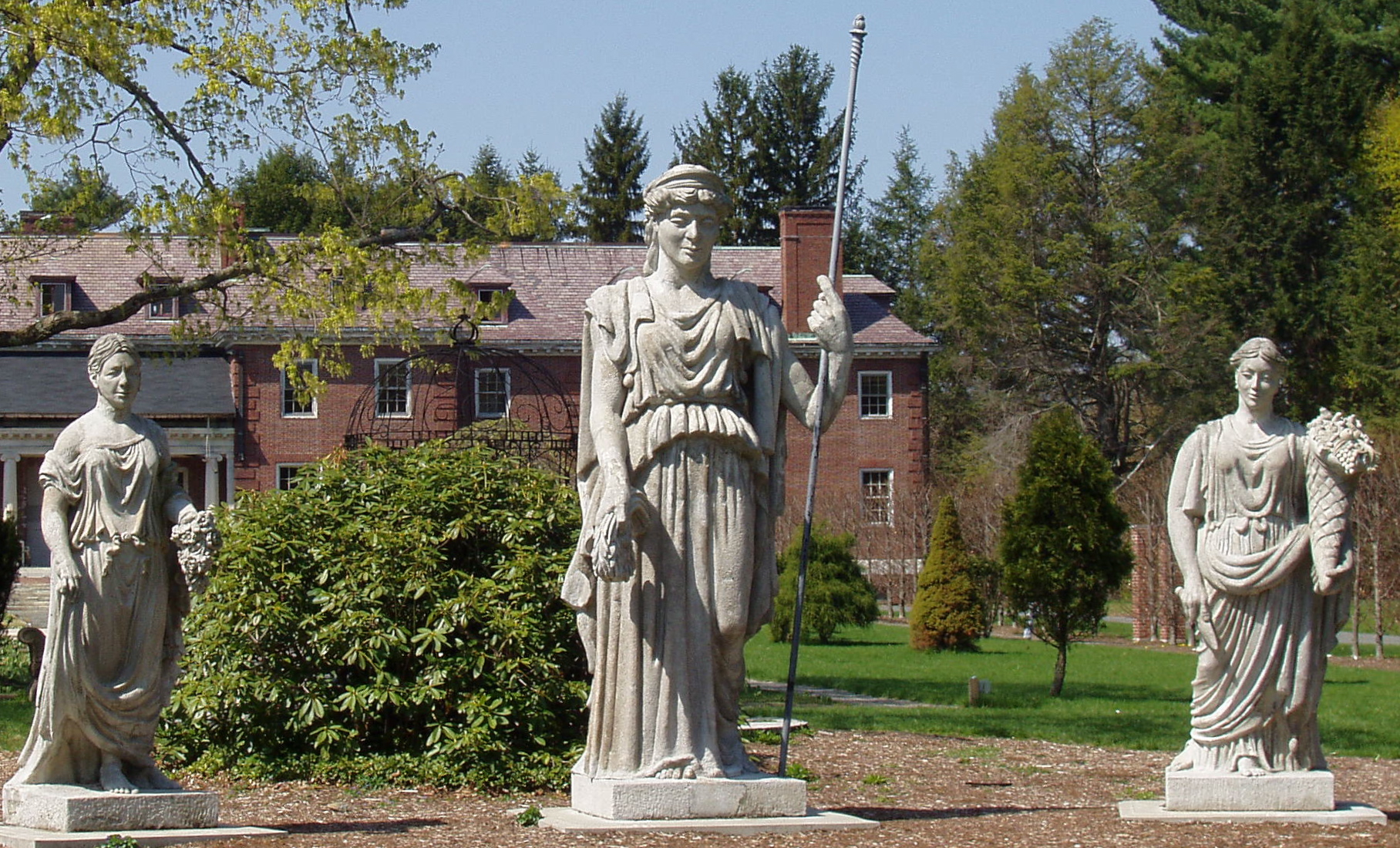
Statuary by Milmore, restored in 1990s (photo 2007)

== See also ==
- Horticultural Hall, Boston (1845), School Street, Boston
- Horticultural Hall, Boston (1901), corner of Massachusetts Avenue and Huntington Avenue, Back Bay, Boston
