= Benjamin Pierce Cheney Jr. =

American business executive (1866–1942)

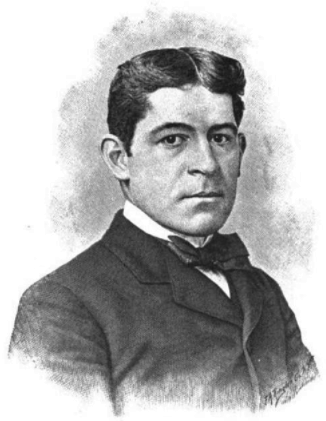
- Born: April 8, 1866; Boston, Massachusetts, U.S.
- Died: June 5, 1942 (aged 76); Mohave County, Arizona, U.S.
- Education: Harvard University (BA)
- Occupation: Businessman
- Spouse: Julia Arthur (m. 1898)
- Parents: Benjamin Pierce Cheney; Elizabeth Cheney

Benjamin Pierce Cheney Jr. (April 8, 1866 – June 5, 1942), was an American business executive. He had extensive investments in railroad securities and served as a director of Wells Fargo & Company and the Atchison, Topeka & Santa Fe Railroad.

== Early life and education ==
Cheney was born in Boston on April 8, 1866, the eldest child of Benjamin Pierce Cheney and Elizabeth Stickney Cheney (née Clapp). His father was one of the pioneer expressmen of the United States. The younger Cheney prepared for college at English High School in Boston and with a private tutor. He received his BA degree from Harvard University in 1890.

== Career ==
Until the death of his father in 1895 Cheney aided him in the management of his interests, which included the largest portfolio of railroad securities held in the Boston area. Upon his father's death, he was elected to succeed him as a director of Wells Fargo & Company.

Having extensively studied railroad operations, Cheney was elected a director of the Atchison, Topeka & Santa Fe Railroad and took an active part in the management of the Santa Fe system.

Besides his directorships with Wells Fargo and the Santa Fe system, Cheney was a director of Manchester Mills, Manchester, Massachusetts, and of numerous Boston banks and trust companies. He also served as president of the San Diego Land & Town Company, one of his father's old ventures. At one time he was a member of the Algonquin, Union, Boston Amateur Athletic and University clubs of Boston, the Metropolitan, Players and Harvard clubs of New York City, and the University Club of San Diego California.

In August 1899 Andrew Christeson was elected to succeed Cheney as a director of Wells Fargo. It is not said that Cheney had resigned, nor is any other information given in the meeting minutes.

As a young man Cheney had taken part in amateur theatricals, and after his marriage he financed a number of professional productions, including a number that starred his wife at venues in Boston, New York City and elsewhere in the Northeast. She also appeared in ten silent films between 1908 and 1919. Her last screen performance was a benefit film to aid victims of World War I. Julia Arthur Cheney made her last Broadway performance in 1921, playing Lady Macbeth opposite Lionel Barrymore.

The Cheneys were also patrons of the Museum of Fine Arts in Boston, where they donated a number of antiquities.

== Personal life ==
He was married at Covington, Kentucky, on February 23, 1898, to Julia Arthur (née Ida Lewis), a noted actress. She was born at Hamilton, Ontario, on May 3, 1868, the daughter of Thomas J. Lewis, a tobacco manufacturer, and Elizabeth Lewis (née Arthur). The Cheneys made their home in Boston, with a summer estate on Calf Island. The couple were childless.

== Later life and death ==
Cheney later suffered heavy financial reverses, and during the last years of his life he was no longer active in business. He died of thirst in the desert near Kingman, Arizona, on June 5, 1942. Julia Arthur Cheney died in Boston on March 28, 1950.
