= Madalene Hill =

American horticulturalist (1913–2009)

Madalene Hill (November 7, 1913 – March 5, 2009) was an American horticulturalist, entrepreneur, writer, and educator known as the "Grand Dame of Herbs." She named and brought popular herb cultivars, such as 'Arp' and 'Hill Hardy' rosemary and 'Hilltop' oregano to U.S. and international markets.

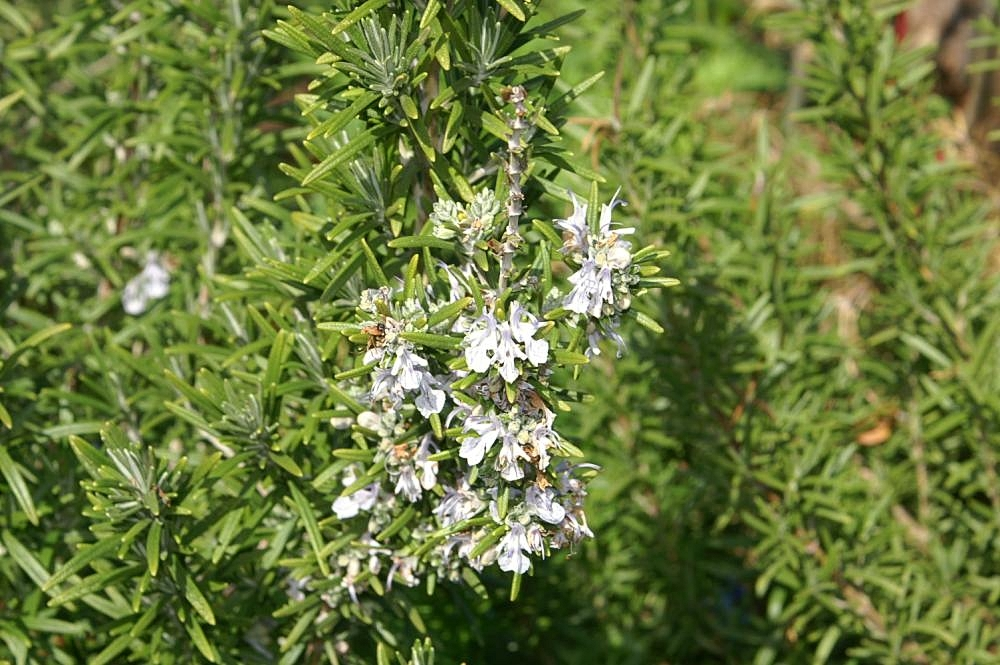
'Madalene Hill,' also known as 'Hill Hardy,' Rosemary shrub growing in the United States National Arboretum in Washington, D.C.

Her work led to popularizing the commercial sale of live and fresh-cut herbs as well as herb-based products for a variety of culinary, decorative, and medicinal uses in the United States starting in the second half of the 20th century. Inspiring generations of herbalists and herb enthusiasts, her advocacy for the appreciation and cultivation of herbs led to her recognition by the American Horticultural Society, the Herb Society of America, and the United States National Arboretum.

== Early life ==
Madalene Hill was born in Rock Island, Colorado County, Texas to a rice farming family. When she was three years old, Hill moved to Kansas, where her mother's relatives lived. As the eldest of 13 children, Hill's formal education ended at the age of 16 so that she could work to support the large family. She began working as a key punch operator at the Federal Land Bank in Wichita around the start of the Great Depression.

Two years after marrying in 1933, Hill moved with her husband to Houston, Texas. The couple had two children, Jerry and Gwen, before divorcing. Hill worked at American General Insurance Company and Brown Shipyard before becoming the first female office manager at IBM from 1949 to 1951.

== Horticultural Work ==
In 1951, Madalene married Jim Hill. The couple "retired" in 1957 to start a commercial gladiolus farm on 13 acres of land they purchased near Cleveland, Texas. Hill joined the Herb Society of America the same year. While finding success growing gladiolus, the vegetable and herb garden Madalene simultaneously planted proved to be more lucrative. The couple began growing and selling dried and living herbs and herbal products, like jellies, from their Hilltop Herb Farm as well as making herb-filled lunches. This venture led to their opening a popular herb-focused restaurant in 1967. Customers, including local politicians, NASA astronauts, and other celebrities, came from near and far and made reservations several months in advance to secure a spot at one of Hilltop's multi-course herb lunches. In 1972, after Gwen completed college, the restaurant began serving dinner.

In the late 1960s, Hill also began lecturing and writing about herb collecting and cultivating, contributing to the increased public interest in and availability of a wide variety of herbs by the early 1980s. These years also brought several tragic events. Hill's husband, Jim, died in April 1982 followed by the burning of their home the next September. A few months later, in December 1983, as over 100 guests arrived for dinner, a tornado destroyed the Hilltop farm.

In 1987, Hill and her daughter, Gwen Barclay, published Southern Herb Growing, a poetically rendered herbal primer and grow guide featuring historical information, design ideas, and photos of lush herb gardens. Both women also published articles in publications like The Herb Companion. From 1986 to 1988, Hill served as president of the Herb Society of America.

After Gwen began working as the director of food services at The International Festival-Institute in Round Top, Texas in 1993, Madalene became curator for the institute's Susan McAshan Gardens. A Mother Earth writer described the Institute as "a 210-acre arts Mecca" set amidst the "lush rolling hills of south-central Texas, where live oak trees provide afternoon shade for longhorn cattle." She created several themed gardens, including a Mediterranean garden, Shakespeare garden, and medicinal herb garden, featuring rare herb specimens.

Hill inspired fellow gardeners and herbalists and autographed her books with her favorite saying: "Grow where you are planted." A friend to the animals, she also gardened by the motto "Plant one for us, one for God, and one for the animals." She introduced several significant herbal cultivars, including 'Arp' rosemary, 'Hilltop' oregano, and 'Newe Ya'ar' sage, to U.S. and international markets, leading to their popular availability. Hill "discovered" and named the 'Arp' rosemary cultivar after noticing a particular rosemary plant that had survived a harsh winter in Arp, Texas. Sharing her discovery with the National Herb Garden, 'Arp' rosemary was first cultivated and trialed in Washington D.C. Hill, along with her daughter, are credited as being the first to market jalapeño jellies. fresh-cut herbs, and herb butters, chutneys, dressings, and vinegars.

The United States National Arboretum's National Herb Garden in Washington D.C. features a section called The Knot Garden, an Elizabethan-inspired collection of evergreen herb shrubs arranged in the shape of a knot, that was dedicated to Hill in the 1980s.

The American Horticultural Society awarded Hill their Catherine H. Sweeney award in 2007. She also received the Helen de Conway Medal of Honor from the Herb Society of America.

She died on March 5, 2009, at the age of 95, following a short illness.
