= Abby Hutchinson Patton =

American writer

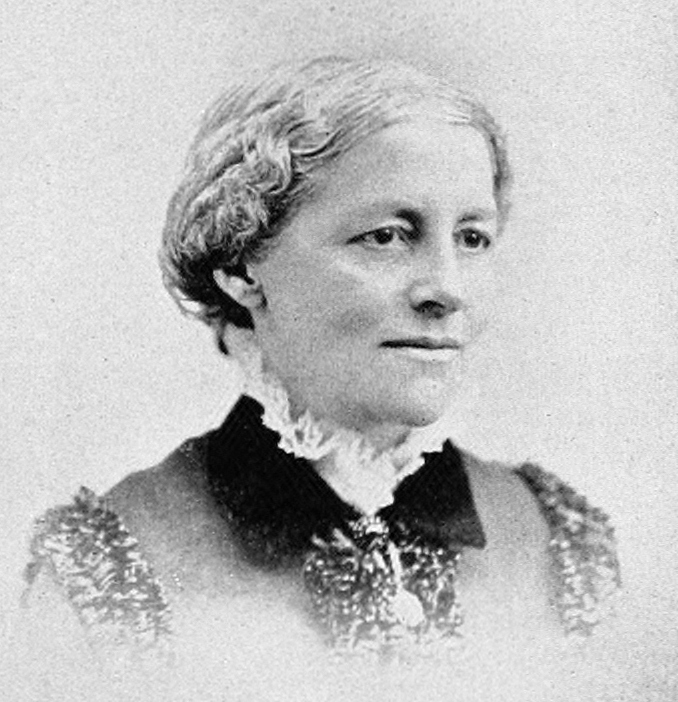
Abby Hutchinson Patton, "A Woman of the Century"

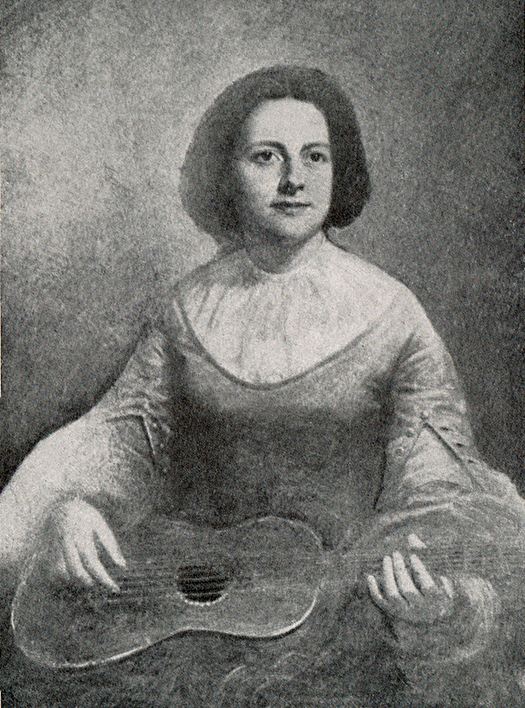
Abby Hutchinson Patton

Abby Hutchinson Patton (August 29, 1829 – November 24, 1892) was an American singer and poet. She performed with siblings as part of a family group, the Hutchinson Family Singers.

== Early life ==
Abby Hutchinson was born in Milford, New Hampshire, on August 29, 1829. She was the fourth daughter and the sixteenth and youngest child of Jesse Hutchinson (1778–1851) and Mary Hastings Leavitt (1783–1868), descendants of the Pilgrims. Thirteen of those children lived to adult age, but in 1892, only John and Abby were living.

Hutchinson came from a long line of musical ancestors, principally on the maternal side. Her mother sang mostly psalms and hymns, and the first words Abby learned to sing were the sacred songs taught her by her mother, while she stood at her spinning-wheel. When four years of age, Abby could sing alto, which seemed to the family a wonderful performance.

A little later she went to the district school with her sister and young brothers. There she acquired the simple English branches of study.

== Career ==
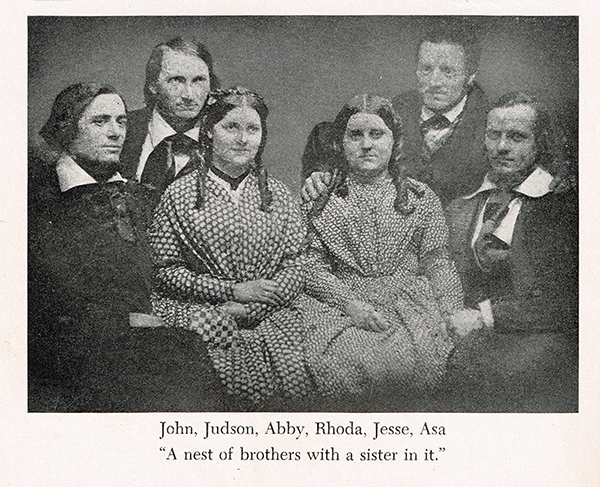
The Hutchinson siblings

In 1839, Abby Hutchinson Patton made her first appearance as a singer in her native town. On that occasion, the parents and their thirteen children took part. In 1841, with her three younger brothers, Judson, John and Asa, she began her concert career. The quartet sang in autumn and winter, and the brothers devoted the spring and summer to the management of their farms, while the sister pursued her studies in the academy.

In May 1843, the Hutchinson family first visited New York City. Their simple dress and manners, along with the harmony of their voices, attracted significant public attention. The press praised their performances, and large audiences attended their concerts. The Hutchinsons, who supported abolitionism, soon aligned themselves with the Abolitionists, and included songs of freedom in their programs. This prompted strong reactions from some pro-slavery audience members, who demonstrated their disapproval by yells, hisses, and occasional threats of personal injury to the singers. Abby would then step forward and sing "The Slave's Appeal," after which the disturbances subsided. The members of the group were also active as songwriters and composers.

In August 1845, Abby went with her brothers, Jesse, Judson, John and Asa, to England. They found warm friends in William Howitt and Mary Howitt, Douglas William Jerrold, Charles Dickens, William Macready, Harriet Martineau, Hartley Coleridge, Mrs. Tom Hood, Eliza Cook, Samuel Rogers, Hon. Mrs. Norton, George Thompson, Richard Cobden, John Bright and many others. Charles Dickens gave the family an evening reception in his home. George Hogarth, the father of Catherine Dickens, Dickens' wife, and critic of Italian opera, after hearing the family sing, took them by the hands and said that he never before had heard such fine harmony. At their opening concert many prominent literary and musical people were present. After one year of singing in Great Britain the family returned to America and renewed their concerts in their native land.

After her marriage, Patton sang with her brothers on special occasions. At the outbreak of the Civil War, in 1861, Patton joined with her brothers in singing the songs of freedom and patriotism.

During her travels, Patton was a frequent contributor to the American newspapers. She composed music to several poems, among which the best known are "Kind Words Can Never Die" and Alfred, Lord Tennyson's "Ring Out, Wild Bells." In 1891, she published a volume entitled "A Handful of Pebbles", consisting of her poems, interspersed with paragraphs and proverbs, containing the essence of her happy philosophy.

She was interested in the education of women and was a firm believer in women's suffrage, which movement she has aided by tongue and pen.

== Personal life ==
On February 28, 1849, Abby Hutchinson married Ludlow Patton (1825–1906), a banker and broker in New York City, and an active member of the New York Stock Exchange.

In April 1873, Ludlow Patton retired from business with a competency. For the next ten years the Pattons traveled for pleasure through Europe, Asia, Africa and all portions of their own country.
