= Horticultural Society of New York =

The Horticultural Society of New York is a non-profit organization founded in 1900 dedicated to horticulture in New York City.
