= The Harmoneons =

American blackface singing group

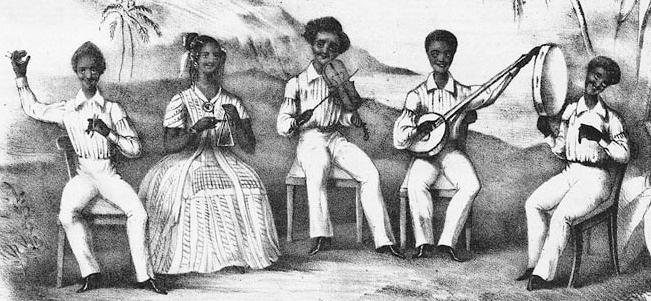
Harmoneons, 1846

The Harmoneons were a blackface musical singing group in the 19th-century United States. The group began as the "Albino Family" in 1843, and later became the "Harmoneon Family." Principal group members included L.V.H. Crosby; Marshall S. Pike (1818-1901); James Power; and John Power Through the years others associated with the group included: F.B. Howe; Francis Lynch; W.H. Mower, manager; T.B. Prendergast; and F.A. Reynolds. In 1847 the Harmoneons performed for President James Polk at the White House.

== Known performances ==
The group sang throughout the U.S., including Baltimore, Maryland (1846-1847, 1850, 1853); Trenton, New Jersey (1847); Portsmouth, New Hampshire (1848); Lowell, Massachusetts (1849); Salem, Massachusetts (1849); Belfast, Maine (1850, 1852); and in Boston at the Melodeon (1849), Horticultural Hall (1849, 1851), and other venues. They also toured in Halifax, Nova Scotia.

== My Last Cigar ==
In the 1860s, the tune of their most famous song, "Dearest Mae," became the tune to which the enormously popular college song, "My Last Cigar," was sung. Though James M. Hubbard has always been credited as the composer of "My Last Cigar," its true tunesmith is James Power of the Harmoneons.

== Songs ==
- "Carolina Melodies" (1845) / words by Marshall S. Pike, music by L.V.H. Crosby.
- "O Give Me a Home If In Foreign Land" (1845) / words by Marshall S. Pike, music by L.V.H. Crosby.
- "O Where Is De Spot Dat We Was Born On" (1845) / words by Marshall S. Pike, music by L.V.H. Crosby.
- "Miss Nancy Paul" (1845) / words by Marshall S. Pike, music by L.V.H. Crosby.
- "I Forget the Gay, Gay World" (1846) / words by Marshall S. Pike, music by L.V.H. Crosby.
- "We Come Again With Song to Greet You" (1846) / words by Marshall S. Pike, music by L. V. H. Crosby.
- "The grave of Washington" (1846) / words by Marshall S. Pike, music by L.V.H. Crosby.
- "Dearest Mae: a celebrated Ethiopian song" (1847) / words by Francis Lynch, tune by James Power, arranged for piano by L.V.H. Crosby.
- "The Lone Starry Hours" (1850) / words by Marshall S. Pike, tune by James Power, arranged for piano by J. P. Ordway.
- "Home Again" (1850) / words and music by Marshall S. Pike, arranged for piano by J. P. Ordway.
- "Happy Are We Tonight" (1850) / words and music by Marshall S. Pike, arranged for piano by J. P. Ordway.
- "The Indian Warrior's Grave" (1850) / words and music by Marshall S. Pike, arranged for piano by J. P. Ordway.
- "The Widowed Bride" (1851) / words by Mrs. H. M. Stephens, music by Francis Lynch.
- "Faded Flowers" (1851) / words by J. H. Brown, music by James Power.
- "The Happiest Time Was Then" (1854) / words and music by L.V.H. Crosby.
- "Somebody is Waiting for Somebody" (1858) / words by Charles Swain, music by L.V.H. Crosby.

== Images ==
Members of the troupe

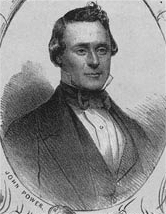
John Power

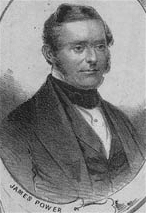
James Power

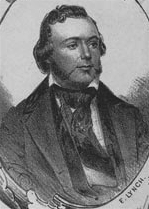
Francis Lynch

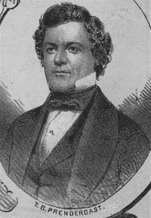
T.B. Prendergast

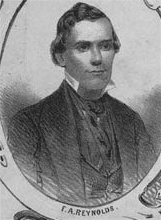
F.A. Reynolds

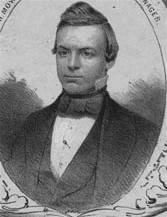
W.H. Mower, manager

Concerts

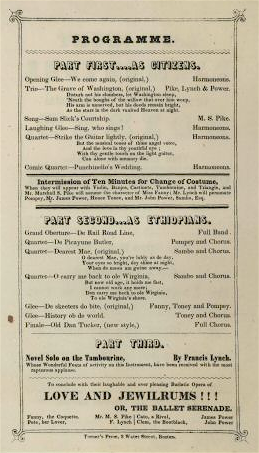
1848, Cambridge, Mass.

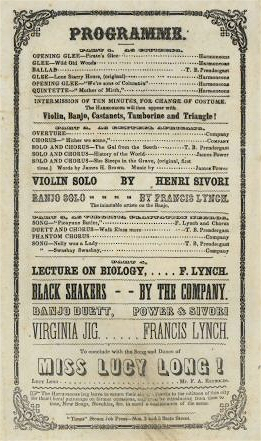
1851, Horticultural Hall, School Street, Boston

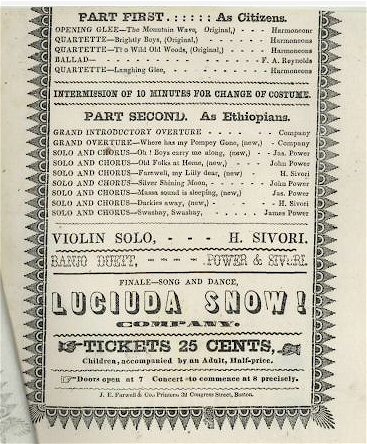
1852, Worcester, Mass.

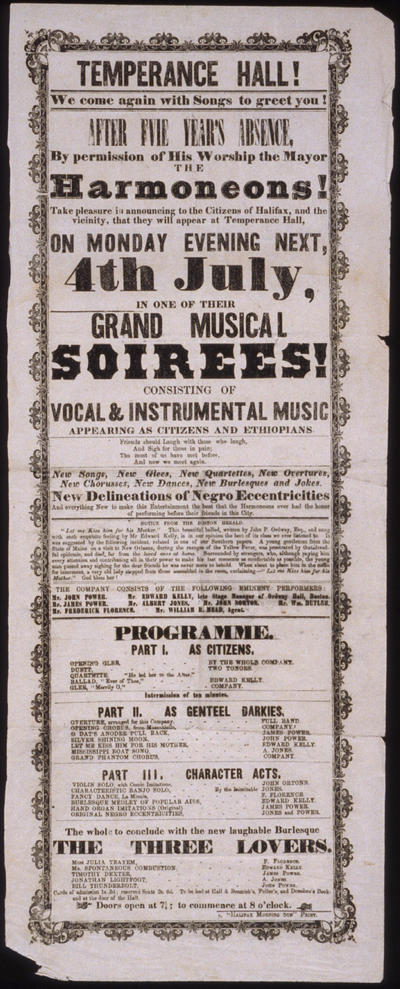
Halifax, Nova Scotia, 19th century

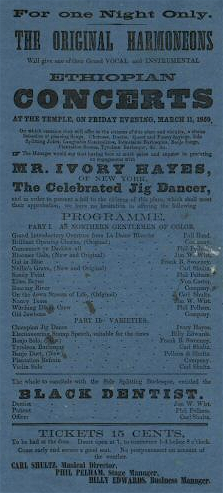
Flyer for Portsmouth, NH concert, 1859
