= American Rhododendron Society =

American non-profit organization about genus Rhododendron

The American Rhododendron Society (ARS) is a non-profit organization whose mission is to encourage interest in, and disseminate information about, the genus Rhododendron. Members' experience ranges from novice to expert. The society provides a means through which people interested in rhododendrons and azaleas can communicate and cooperate with others via its publications, events, local and regional meetings and international conferences. Society activities include public education, plant sales, flower shows, seed exchanges, and scientific research. It has chapters throughout the United States and Canada, as well as in Denmark, Finland, the Netherlands, Scotland, Sikkim, and Sweden.

The ARS publishes a quarterly journal, The Journal of the American Rhododendron Society, covering a wide range of topics including rhododendron culture, propagation techniques, hybridization results, public and private gardens, plant portraits, companion plants, plant hunting explorations, rhododendron scientific research, Society news and events, and much more. The journal was first established in April 1947 as the Quarterly Bulletin of the American Rhododendron Society.

The ARS funds research on rhododendrons and azaleas, presents Rhododendron of the Year awards, and gives gold and silver medals to society members for outstanding service. Local chapters also hold events and meetings, maintain gardens and support publications.
