= Horticultural Hall (Boston, 1845) =

Building in Boston, Massachusetts, US (built 1845)

Coordinates: 42°21′27.5″N 71°3′34.84″W

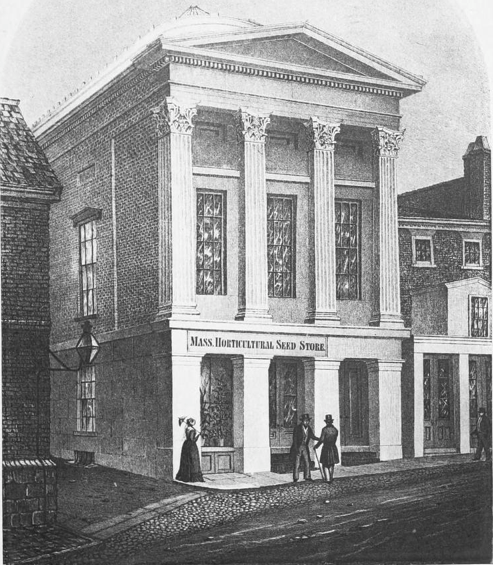
Horticultural Hall, School Street, Boston, ca.1840s

Horticultural Hall (1845-1860s) of Boston, Massachusetts, stood at no.40 School Street. The Massachusetts Horticultural Society erected the building and used it as headquarters until 1860. Made of granite, it measured "86 feet in length and 33 feet in width ... [with] a large hall for exhibitions, a library and business room, and convenient compartments for the sale of seeds, fruits, plants and flowers." Among the tenants: Journal of Agriculture; Azell Bowditch's seed store; and Morris Brothers, Pell & Trowbridge minstrels.

== Events ==
1840s

- Benjamin Champney exhibit
- Exhibit of John Skirving's "Panorama of Fremont's Overland Journey to Oregon and California"

1850s

- "Living specimens ... of mankind" from Iximaya, Central America
- Harmoneons performance
- American Pomological Society meeting
- 1854: Boston's first Women's Rights Convention

== See also ==
- Horticultural Hall, Boston (1865)
- Horticultural Hall, Boston (1901)
