= Herb Society of America =

Horticultural organization

The Herb Society of America
- Abbreviation: HSA
- Formation: 1933; 93 years ago
- Type: Nonprofit
- Tax ID no.: 34-1596261
- Legal status: 501(c)(3)
- Headquarters: The Vineyard House, Kirtland, Ohio
- Location: United States
- Board President: Betsy Smith
- Executive Director: Laura Lee Martin
- Board of directors: Betsy Smith; Casey King; Amanda Swope Joos; Laura A. Mullen; Krystal Maxwell; Peggy Riccio; William “Bill” Varney; Linda Franzo; Lisa-Marie Maryott; Jessica Dickerson; Karen O'Brien; Rosemary Loveall-Sale; Linda Lange; Sharon Hosch
- Website: www.herbsociety.org

The Herb Society of America (HSA) is a nonprofit, volunteer-based organization dedicated to promoting the knowledge and appreciation of herbs through educational programs and research.

As of 2024, the society has 40 chapters throughout the United States.

== History ==
The HSA was founded in 1933 by seven women who were interested in learning more about the botany of herbs and their cultivation. They asked Edgar Anderson of the Arnold Arboretum for instruction and guidance. The women decided to form a society to further their own interest in herbs and expand the knowledge and use of herbs among others.

To commemorate to the United States Bicentennial in 1976, The Society began the work to establish the National Herb Garden at the National Arboretum in Washington, D.C.

Its national headquarters are adjacent to the Holden Arboretum outside of Cleveland, Ohio.

It publishes a journal The Herbarist once a year.

== Awards ==
The Herb Society of America has awarded multiple named awards.

1. The Helen De Conway Little Medal of Honor
2. The Nancy Putnam Howard Award for Excellence in Horticulture
3. The Gertrude B. Foster Award for Excellence in Herbal Literature
4. The Joanna McQuail Reed Award for the Artistic Use of Herbs
5. The Elizabeth Crisp Rea Award
6. The Madalene Hill Award For Excellence In Herbal Education
7. The Mighty Oak Award for Excellence in Conservation
8. Certificate of Achievement
9. Certificate of Appreciation

== See also ==
- American Fern Society
