= Massachusetts Horticultural Society =

American horticultural organization

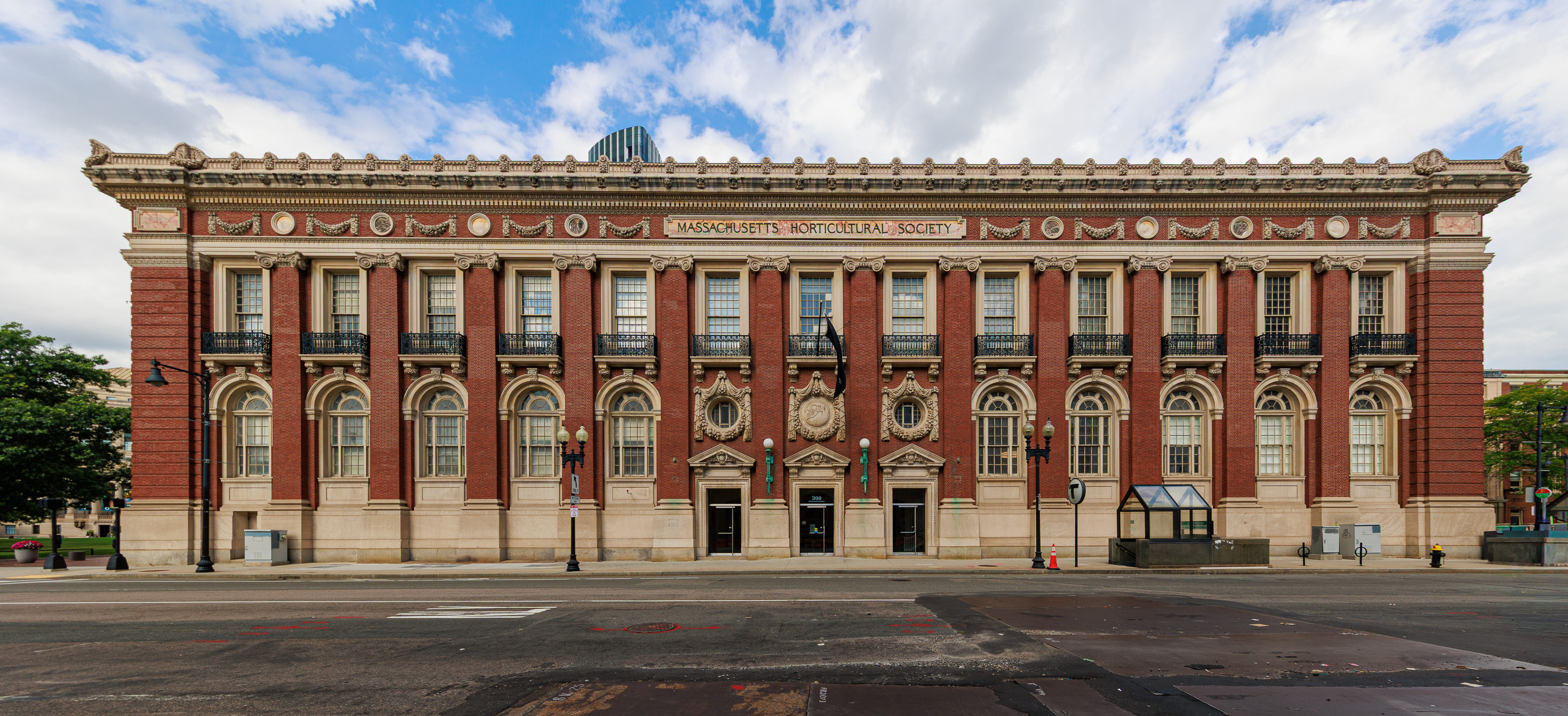
- Abbreviation: MHS
- Formation: 12 June 1829
- Founder: William H. Sumner
- Founded at: Boston, Massachusetts
- Type: Nonprofit
- Purpose: Massachusetts Horticultural Society is a 501(c)3 nonprofit organization that helps people change their lives and communities for the better by growing plants together.
- Headquarters: The Garden at Elm Bank 900 Washington Street, Wellesley, MA 02482
- Location: Wellesley, Massachusetts
- Website: www.masshort.org
- Formerly called: MassHort Mass Hort

The Massachusetts Horticultural Society, sometimes abbreviated to Mass Hort or MHS, is an American horticultural society based in Massachusetts. It describes itself as the oldest formally organized horticultural institution in the United States. As of 2014, it had some 5,000 members.

== History ==
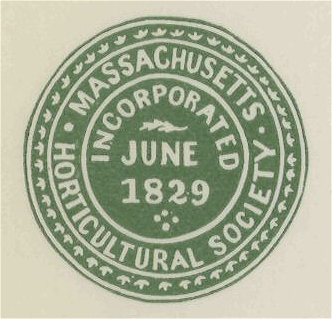

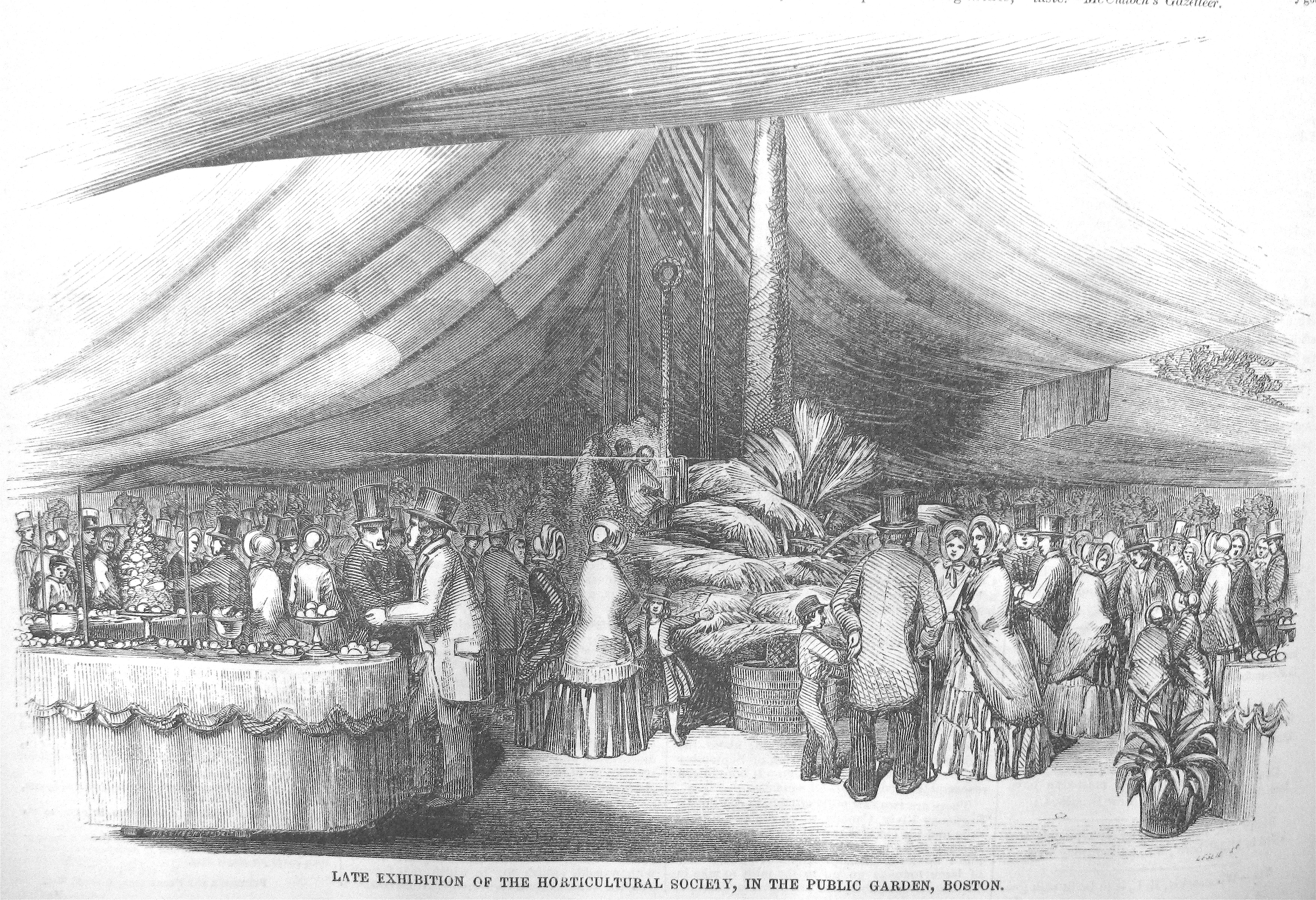
Exhibition of the Society

The society was established in 1829 in Boston as the Boston Horticultural Society, and promptly began weekly exhibits (in Faneuil Hall and Quincy Market) of locally grown fruit and later vegetables, teaching the newest horticultural techniques and breeds, including the local Concord grape in 1853. It continued this tradition from 1871 through 2008 with its annual New England Spring Flower Show.

In 1831 the society bought a 72-acre (290,000 m^{2}) estate called "Sweet Auburn" for an arboretum, garden, and cemetery. Although the horticultural garden never materialized, in 1835 the site was incorporated as Mount Auburn Cemetery. Until 1976, the society received one-fourth of the proceeds from the sale of Mount Auburn's cemetery lots.

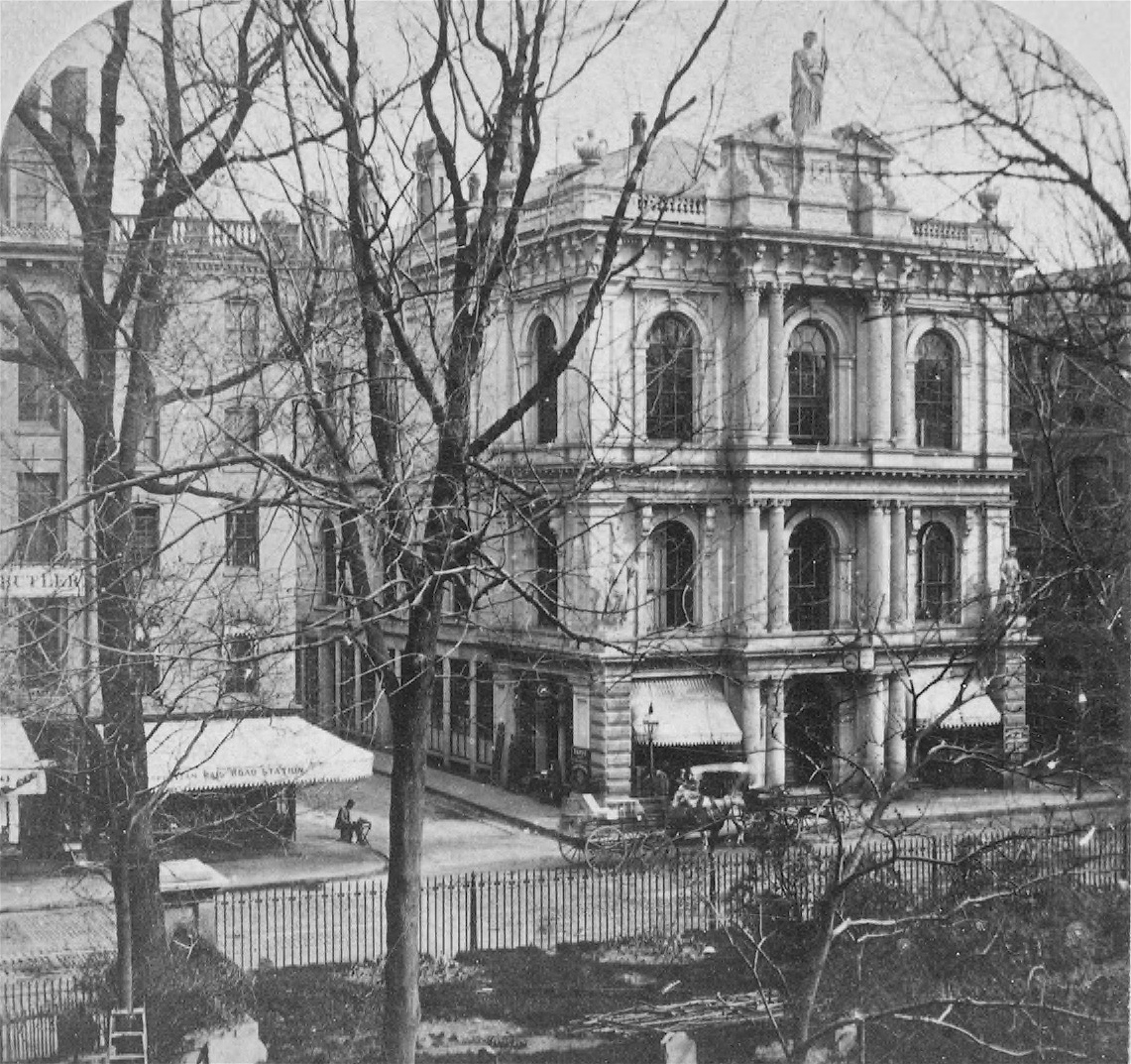
Horticultural Hall dedicated in 1865 on Tremont Street, Boston. Note the statues at the corner of the second floor and on the roof which are now displayed in the "Garden of the Goddesses" at Elm Bank Horticulture Center.

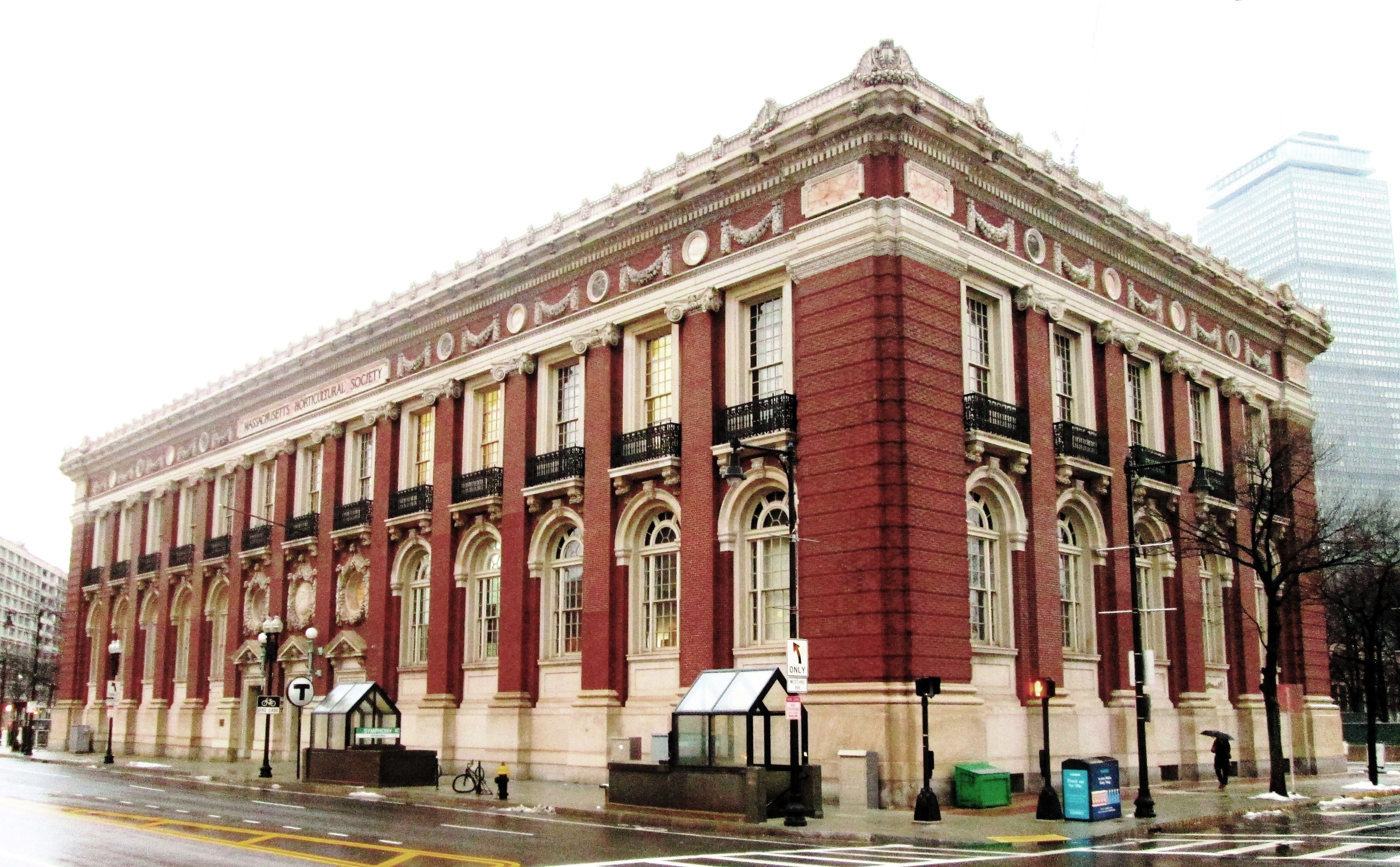
The current Horticulural Hall, at 300 Massachusetts Avenue at the corner of Huntington Avenue, was built in 1901 and was designed by Edmund March Wheelwright.

=== Horticultural Hall ===
In its early years, the Society met in various locations in Boston. Starting in 1845, the society has built for itself three successive exhibit halls, each named "Horticultural Hall." The first was located on School Street; the second on Tremont Street, and the third on Massachusetts Avenue.

=== Elm Bank ===
Since 2001 the society's headquarters have been at the Elm Bank Horticulture Center (36 acres) in Wellesley. The 36 acres (150,000 m^{2}) encompass multiple gardens including an acre-sized one designed by prominent UK plantsman Adrian Bloom. Other gardens include the Weezie's Children's Garden, an Italianate Garden, a floral and vegetable trial garden run as part of the All-American Selections group, and specialty gardens built around rhododendron, daylilies, herbs and native plants.

=== Financial difficulties ===
In 2008 the society found itself in financial difficulty. Following revelation that then-new executive director Bob Feige had spent three days in jail the year before for failing to pay employees at a former business he owned, the trustees began a detailed review of the books which revealed the organization to be "essentially broke and facing a stack of bills with no way to pay them." Feige resigned after the trustees presented the facts, but it was apparent that problems were building over a number of years due to overspending. In 2002 the society sold $5.25 million of rare books and prints to raise cash, at which time the Massachusetts Attorney General strongly advised the society to educate its trustees on sound financial practices. In order to conserve cash the society decided to not hold the New England Spring Flower Show in 2009 for the first time since 1871, opting instead for a truncated event in downtown Boston called 'Blooms".

In September 2009, MassHort announced that it would incorporate "Blooms" as part of the Boston Flower & Garden Show, produced by the Paragon Group, Inc., a privately held events marketing group. That show took place in March 2010 at the Seaport World Trade Center. MassHort took responsibility for two floral design competitions, amateur horticulture competition, Ikebana displays, plant society displays and one day of lectures. In its May 2010 newsletter, 'The Leaflet', MassHort described the venture as 'financially successful'. Also in its May 2010 newsletter, MassHort reported it had reached agreement with the bulk of its remaining creditors by selling off an additional group of books from its collection.

=== Mass Hort 2011 and Beyond ===
In January 2011 the Board of Trustees hired Katherine K. Macdonald as Executive Director/President of the Society after the Board stabilized the organization's financials.

The Garden at Elm Bank includes twelve display gardens. In 2011, a new vegetable garden was designed to support the Garden to Table program. By 2013, this vegetable garden was producing over 4000 pounds of produce that was donated to two food pantries. The Welcome Garden near the parking lot entrance was added in 2012, designed by Paul Miskovsky. Improvements to the Italianate Garden included the restoration of the fountain, a central element to the garden.

Since 2011, over $250,000 in capital investments have been made to the property, thanks to foundation grants.

Mass Hort at the Flower Show provides the management of the amateur horticulture, floral design, Ikebana, and photography for Paragon Group, the owners of the Boston Flower & Garden Show.

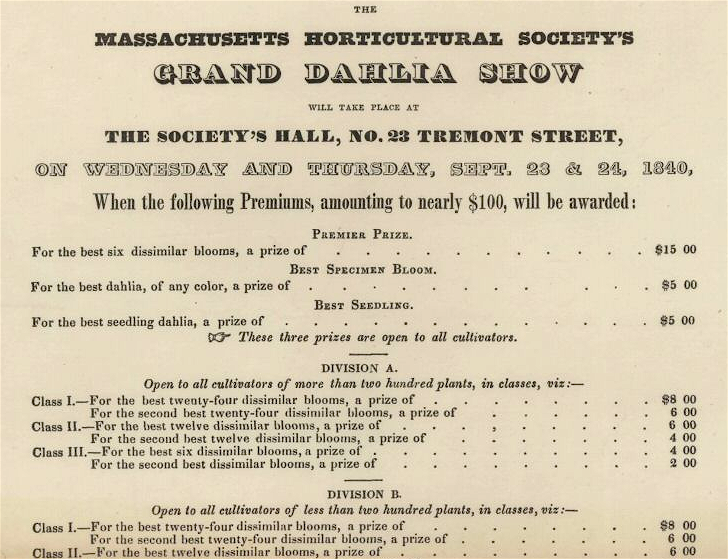
1840 Grand Dahlia show

== Award winners ==
- 1911 George R. White Medal of Honor - Victor Lemoine for his lifetime contributions to horticulture.
- 1921 George R. White Medal of Honor - Louisa Boyd Yeomans King, the first woman recipient.
- 1922 George R. White Medal of Honor - Albert Burrage for establishing an outstanding collection of rare orchids in Beverly, Massachusetts.
- 1937 Thomas Roland Medal Winner - Arlow Stout for his pioneering work in the hybridization of daylilies.
- 1952 Thomas Roland Medal Winner - Victor A. Tiedjens for his skill in hydroponics and his outstanding work in the field of vegetable gardening.
- 2011 George R. White Medal of Honor - Lynden B. Miller

== See also ==
- Horticultural Hall, Boston (1845)
- Horticultural Hall, Boston (1865)
- Horticultural Hall, Boston (1901)
- Worcester County Horticultural Society
