= John Appleton Brown =

American landscape painter

- Born: John Appleton Brown; July 12, 1844; West Newbury, Massachusetts, U.S.
- Died: January 18, 1902 (aged 57); Manhattan, New York City, U.S.
- Occupation: American landscape painter
- Spouse: Agnes Augusta Bartlett (m. 1874)
- Children: none

Signature
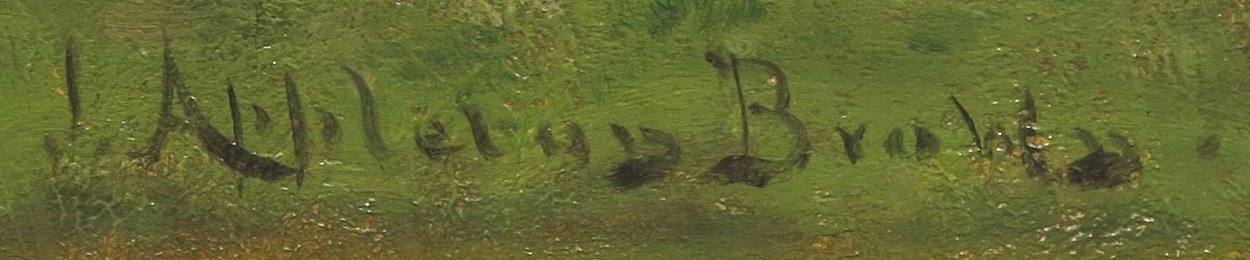

John Appleton Brown (July 12, 1844 – January 18, 1902) was an American landscape painter working largely in pastels and oils, born in West Newbury, Massachusetts. He showed talent at an early age and studied under Emile Lambinet in France. For many years he worked and showed in Boston, summering in his native northeastern Massachusetts and painting his best known lyrical landscapes there. In 1891 he and his wife, noted artist Agnes Augusta Bartlett Brown, moved to New York City, where he died on January 18, 1902.

== Family and education ==
Although Massachusetts town vital records and many sources identify West Newbury, Massachusetts, as the place of John Appleton Brown's birth on July 12, 1844, some say he was born in the larger neighboring city of Newburyport, where Brown attended high school. He was the second of two sons of George Frederick Handel Brown (a combmaker) and Asenath L. Page. His parents supported Appleton Brown's artistic talent throughout his childhood; he spent summer school vacations painting landscapes of his native West Newbury and the surrounding area. Initially he spent a year studying with New England landscape painter Alfred Thompson Bricher. After a year working in a Boston studio shared with fellow-novice Benjamin Curtis Porter, in 1866 Brown traveled to France, where in 1867-68 he studied under landscape artist Emile Lambinet, himself a protégé of Jean-Baptiste-Camille Corot.

== Career ==
By the 1870s, Brown was a successful and well-known Boston painter. His work was exhibited with his friends and mentors William Morris Hunt and Joseph Foxcroft Cole, at shows of the Boston Art Club, and at prominent galleries. In the fall of 1874, he and his wife Agnes went to France to study and paint. He displayed and sold works in the Paris Salon of 1875, whose jurors included established Barbizon school painters. The Browns typically maintained a winter studio in Boston and had a summer house in West Newbury, whose surrounds comprised the rural New England landscapes which were frequent subjects of his art. Starting in 1879, both Browns had annual exhibitions at Boston's Doll and Richards gallery. At this time Brown's paintings and drawings were used as book illustrations.

According to Dartmouth College curator and art writer Barbara J. MacAdam, in the 1880s Brown adopted a brighter palette and "turned more frequently to images of fruit trees in full flower, lending him the sobriquet of 'Appleblossom Brown.'" At the invitation of Francis Davis Millet, in 1886 the Browns joined an artists' colony in England, where Americans including John Singer Sargent and Edwin Austin Abbey were working. His paintings of the English countryside, much like in New England, were well received in Boston. Later in the 1880s the Browns summered not only in West Newbury, but also at Celia Thaxter's salon on Appledore Island among the Isles of Shoals off the coast of southern Maine. There he became a close friend of Childe Hassam and painted seascapes, including the dramatic and powerful "Storm at the Isles of Shoals."

In the 1890s, Brown's success had expanded well beyond Boston. When he participated in an art show in Chicago, a reviewer described Brown's picture "In the Month of May" as "a brilliant, joyous study of apple-blossoms and sunny greens." In 1891, the Browns moved from Boston to New York City, which offered a more vibrant arts scene. In 1893 Brown received a medal at the World's Columbian Exposition.

== Critics’ appraisal ==
Particularly with respect to the New England spring and summer landscapes for which he was best known and most appreciated, commenters described Brown's work as tender and delicate in its depiction of nature. His pictures were described as evocative of—but not imitative of—Corot. A rare negative review appeared in the March, 1872 issue of the Atlantic Monthly. This article focused on an early Brown work "Grindelwald Valley," whose subject of majestic soaring mountains in the Swiss Alps was, in the reviewer's opinion, an audacious one for Brown. In this critic's view, Brown's treatment of such a grand subject as mere sketch had the “unpardonable defect of being thinly painted.” A little over five years later, another Atlantic Monthly review concluded that in the autumn landscape "On the Artichoke, West Newbury," Brown's treatment of clouds reflected in water was appropriately not belabored in its detail: "Though done with one sweep of the brush, it would be hard to conceive how any subsequent caressing or tinkering could add an iota to their tender and evanescent loveliness."

Poetry as inspiration for, as reflected in, as inspired by, and as illustrated with Appleton Brown's work is another common theme among critics and writers. In 1879 Brown collaborated with Lucy Larcom, illustrating her book Landscape in American Poetry, which viewed the same New England landscape Brown painted through the words of noteworthy poets, such as John Greenleaf Whittier, from the same region. Just as poetry inspired Appleton Brown's pictures, so too did his art inspire poetry. Will Amos Reed's book of verse Through Broken Reeds contains the poem "On Seeing a Picture by J. Appleton Brown." It begins, "How deep in nature’s lore must artists dip / To form such lights and shadows with a brush’s tip!"

== Personal life and death ==
In June 1874, Brown married Newburyport native Agnes Augusta Bartlett. She was a noted artist in her own right, painting in oil in a style not unlike her husband's. Her subjects included landscapes, flowers, and later cats.

By all accounts, Brown was charming, a good friend, and "retiring and modest" in nature. He was also said to be an excellent art teacher. At the same time, Brown's work was exhibited at fashionable shows that displayed not only art but also fashionable art viewers. Brown maintained "social relations with our best families," serving, for instance, as an officer in Boston's St. Botolph Club which included the historians Henry Cabot Lodge and Francis Parkman. Brown was also a member of the Society of American Artists, and an associate of the National Academy of Design.

Brown died at age 57, on January 18, 1902. His friends and fellow artists Alfred Quinton Collins and Frank Henry Shapleigh accompanied his body to Newburyport for burial. In March 1902, the Century Club mounted a memorial exhibition of his work. His works are now housed in such institutions as the Harvard University art museums, the Isabella Stewart Gardner Museum, and the Museum of Fine Arts, Boston.

== Gallery ==
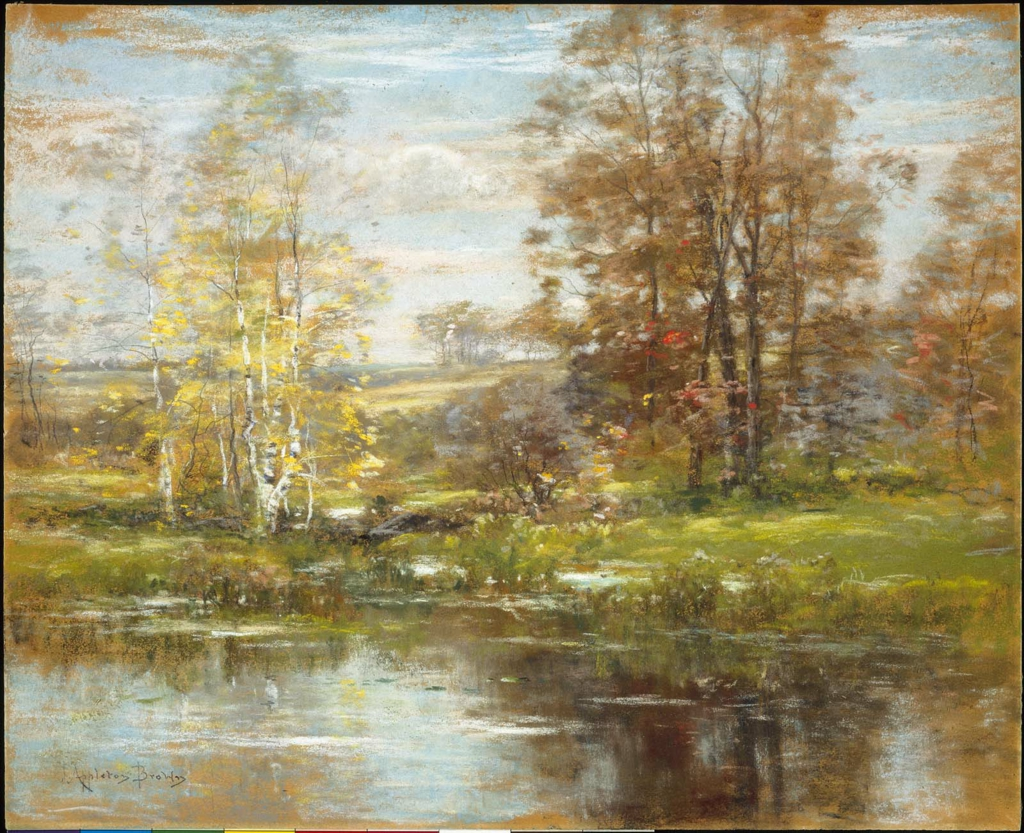
New England Landscape

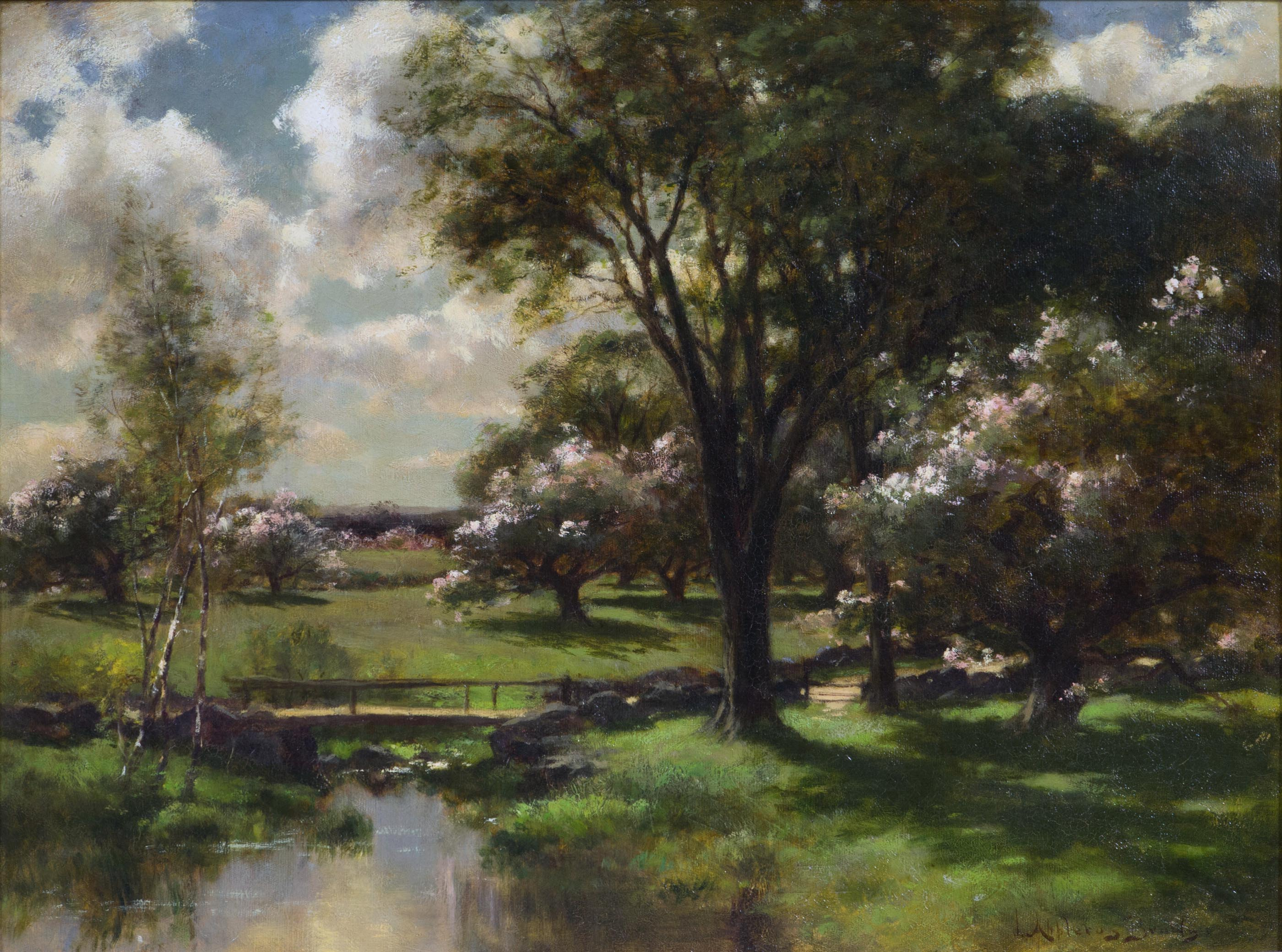
Bridge in Late Spring

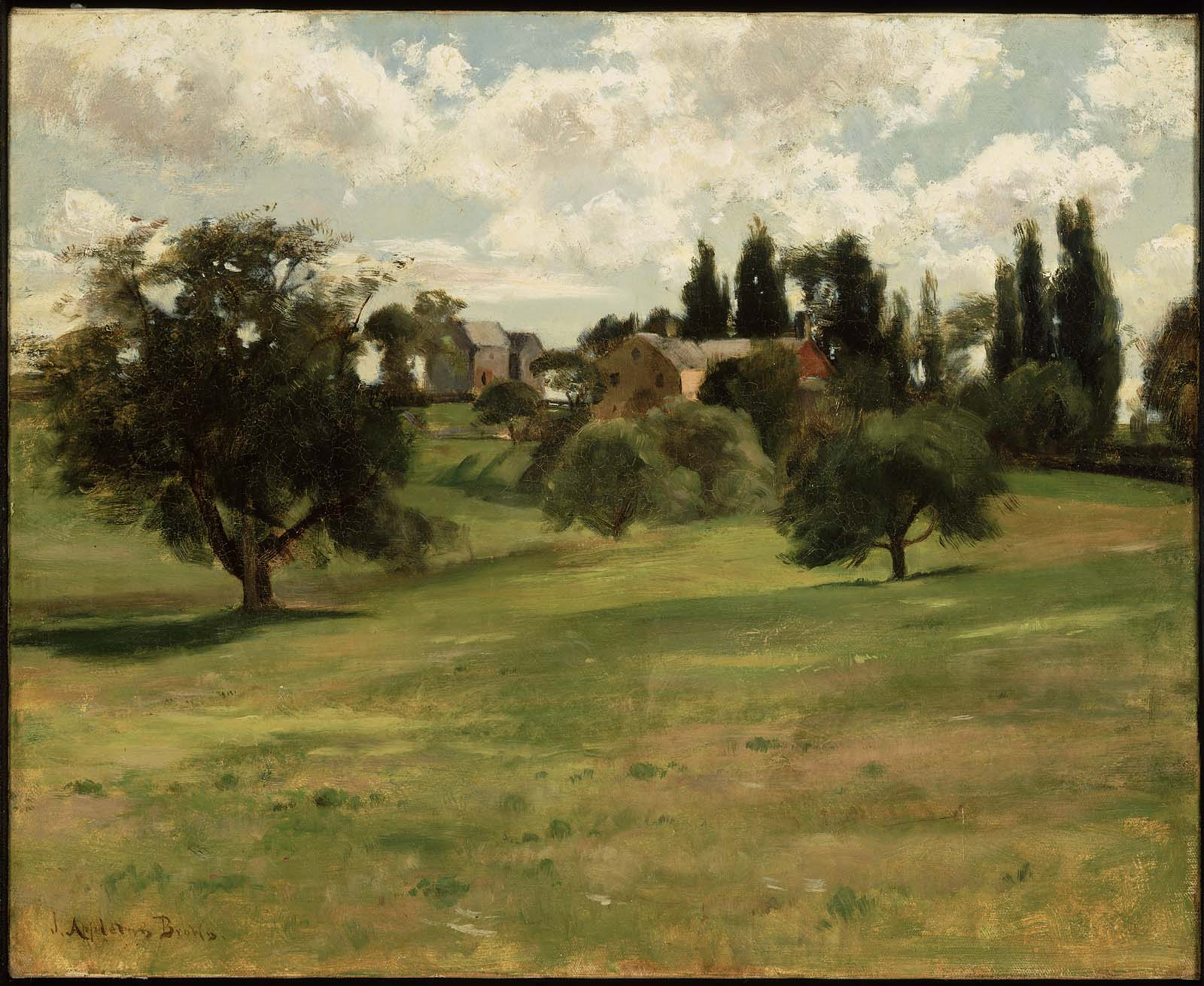
Hillside in Summer

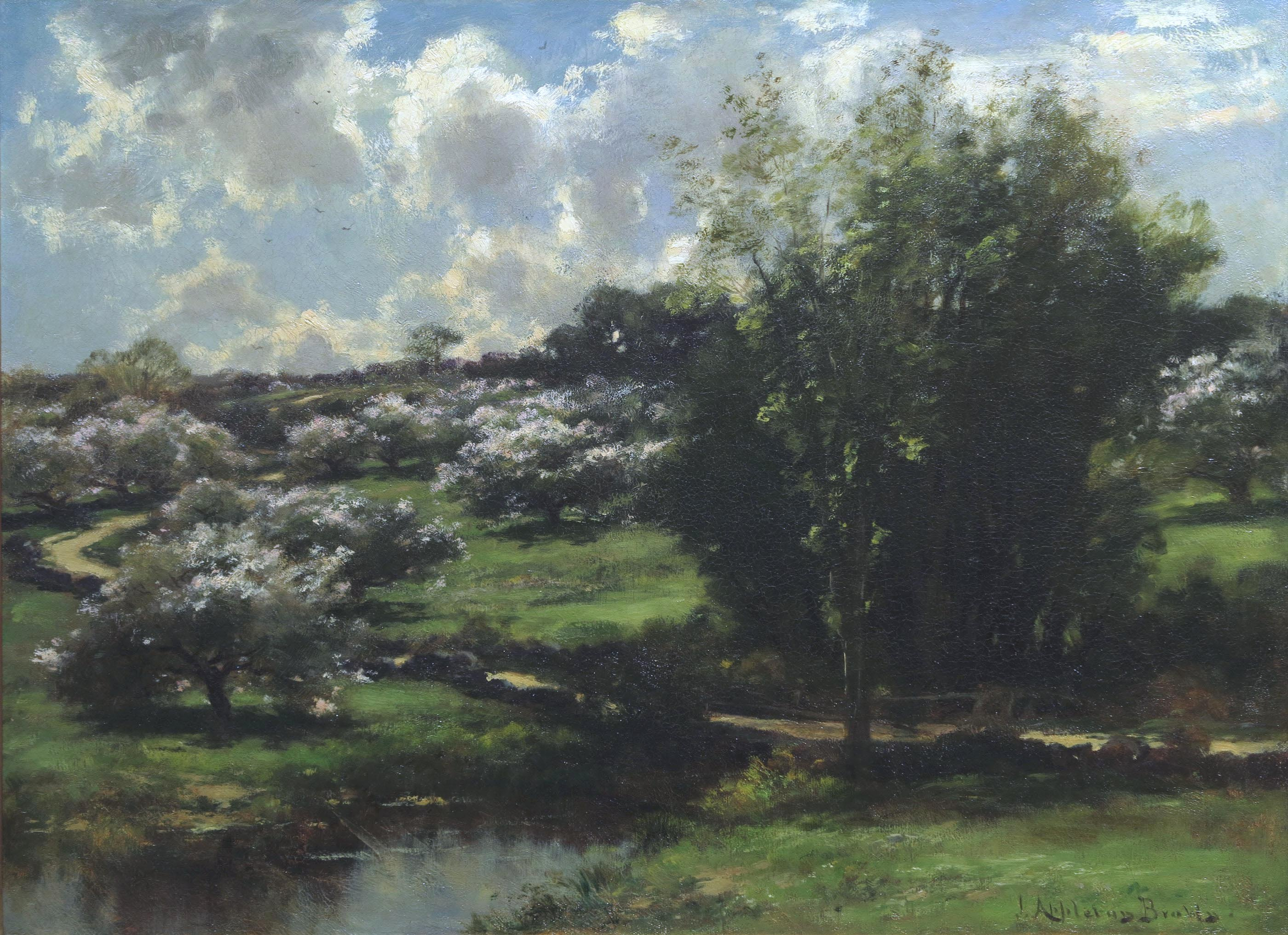
A Country Road
