= John Tufts =

John Tufts may refer to:

- John Q. Tufts (1840–1908), American politician
- John Tufts (music educator) (1689–1750)
