= Newell Farm =

- U.S. National Register of Historic Places
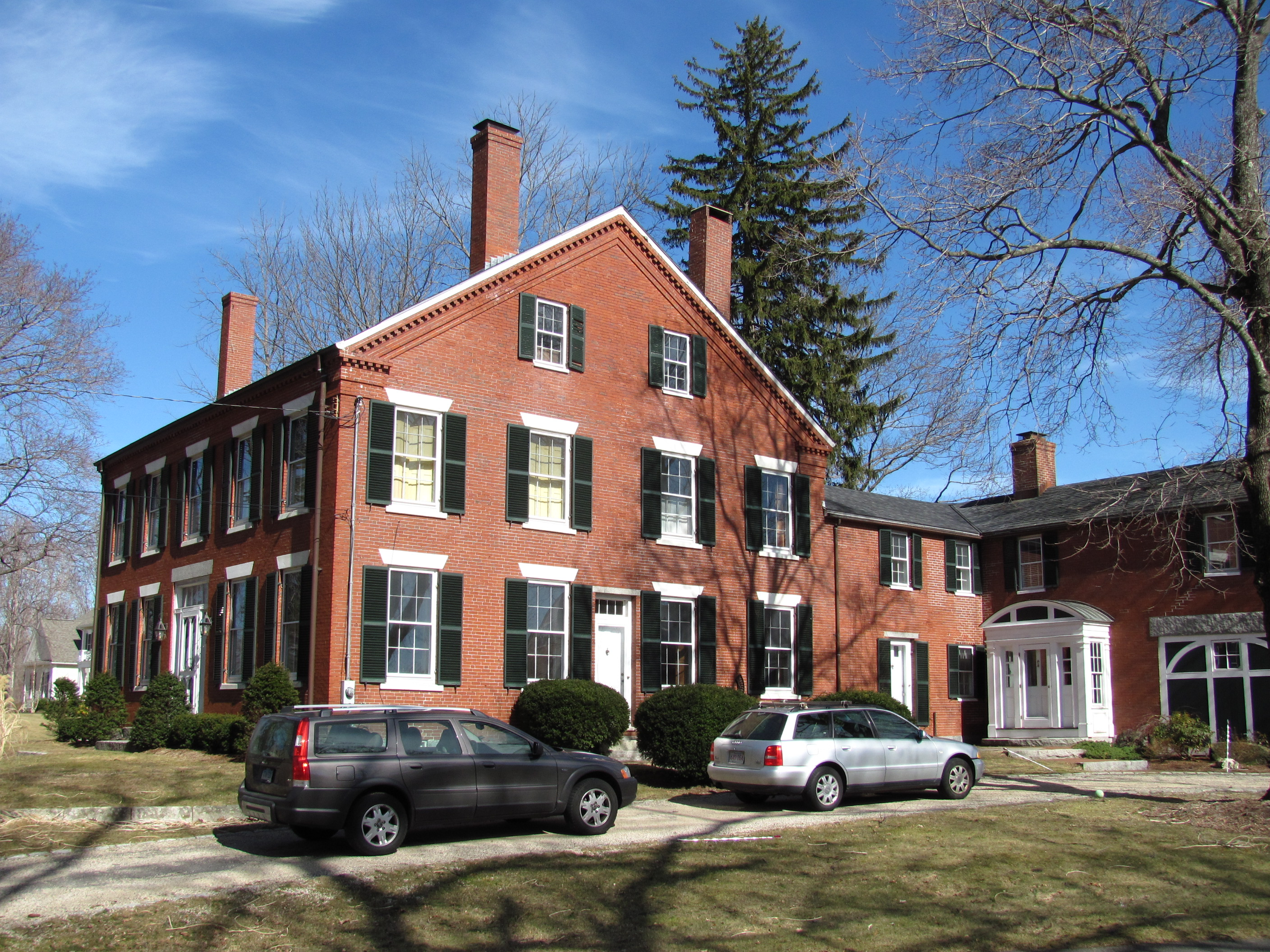
- Newell Farm

- Location within Massachusetts Location within the United States
- Location: West Newbury, Massachusetts
- Coordinates: 42°47′33″N 70°59′50″W
- Built: 1846
- Architect: Newell, Col. Moses
- Architectural style: Greek Revival, Federal
- NRHP reference No.: 78001406
- Added to NRHP: July 21, 1978

Newell Farm is a historic farmhouse at 243 Main Street in West Newbury, Massachusetts.

It was built in 1846 and added to the National Register of Historic Places in 1978.

== History ==
The Newell Farm in West Newbury, Massachusetts, was named to the National Register of Historic Places in 1978. Researchers for the Massachusetts Historical Commission have found the house significant for two reasons. First, the house is built in a Greek Revival/Federal Style tradition. Second, a portion of the materials used in the construction of the house were salvaged from the demolition of buildings in 1845 on Beacon Hill in Boston to make room for an addition to the Massachusetts State House.

Colonel Moses Newell built the 25 room house now standing at 243 Main St. in 1846. His father Joseph Newell was a Sargeant in Captain William Rodger's Third Company, a local West Newbury unit, during the American Revolutionary War. The Newells owned at that time a house which stood closer to the street by the well on the property. The original house was moved across the street to make room for the present house.

Moses Newell shuttled the building materials including mantels, inside shutters, windows, panelling, doors, and lintels from Boston after he sent loads of butchered meat from the farm to the Charlestown Navy Yard. Bricks were made in a local brickyard in West Newbury, close to where Pentucket Regional High School now stands. The brick walls are three layers thick with no insulation.

The main body of the three-story house is square with a peaked roof. It has five bays on the front and sides, four chimneys, granite footings and door lintels, sandstone window lintels and sills, and granite steps. There is a two-story narrower extension of the main building with a side entrance. The main building has fret work at the cornices and under the eaves. The main house has eight feet of cellar space beneath it.

The interior originally had 25 rooms plus main halls running east–west and side halls running north–south. There were eight fireplaces in the main building. All twenty-three windows in the major rooms of the main building had wooden interior shutters (six or eight panels per window) with various types of hinges made by J. Clark & Son of Wolverhampton, England.

== Moses Newell ==
Moses Newell played an active role in civic affairs in the town, almost from the date West Newbury was incorporated as a town on February 18, 1819. He was on the board of Selectmen intermittently from 1822 to 1860, and served as moderator at town meetings at various times during those years.

His son, Captain Richard Newell, traveled for most of his life on ships, but he lived in the house after his retirement. A member of the Marine Society of Newburyport, Richard Newell was born in 1834 and went to sea as a young boy of 15, according to an account he wrote himself in the chronicles, "The Marine Society of Newburyport".

== See also ==
- National Register of Historic Places listings in Essex County, Massachusetts
