= West Newbury, Massachusetts =

- Town
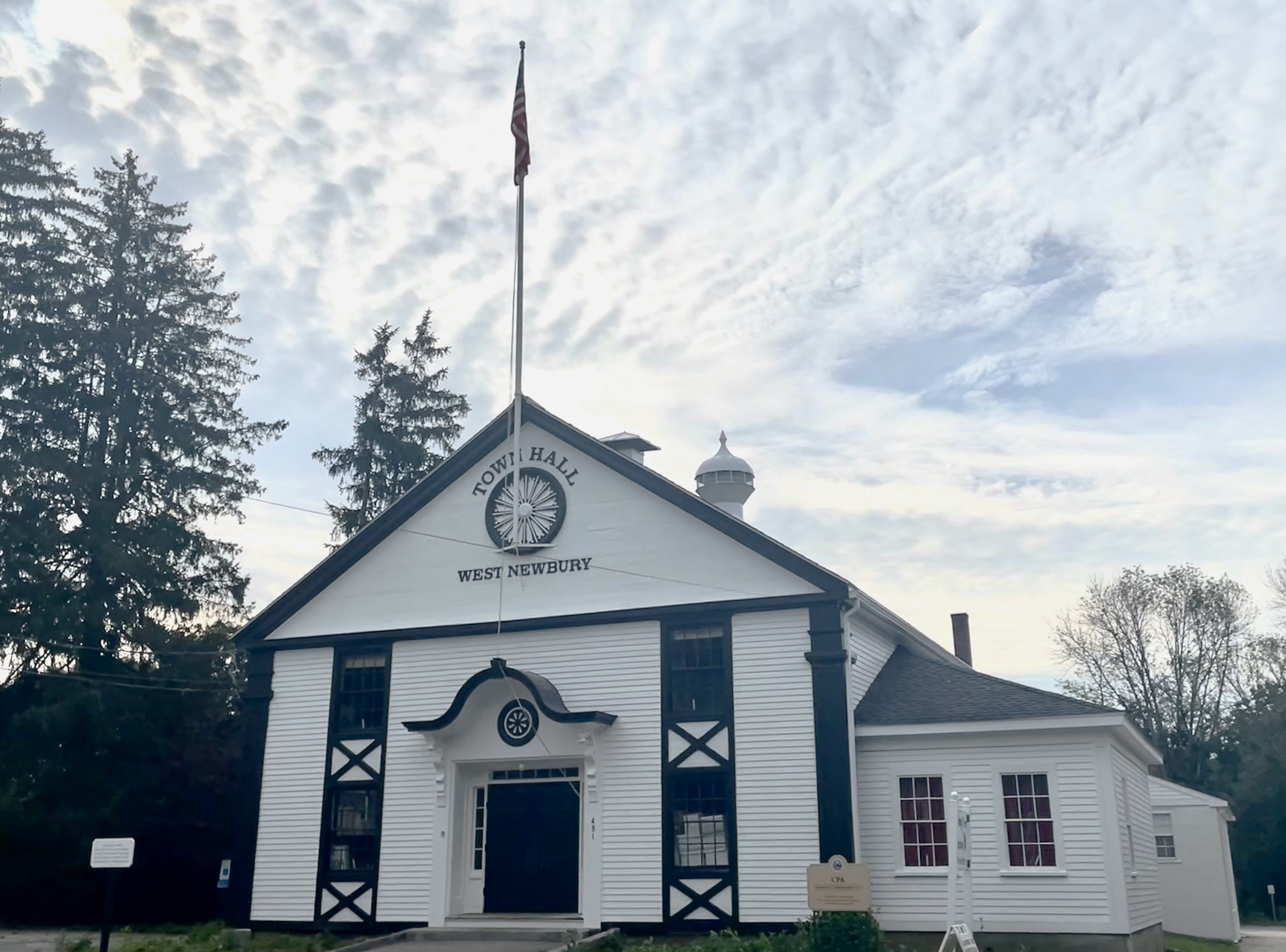
- West Newbury Town Hall, 2023

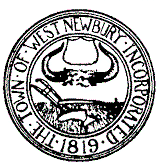
- Seal

- Location in Essex County and the state of Massachusetts.

- Location in the United States
- Coordinates: 42°48′05″N 70°59′25″W
- Country: United States
- State: Massachusetts
- County: Essex
- Settled: 1635
- Incorporated: 1819

Government
  - Type: Open town meeting
  - Town Manager: Angus Jennings
  - Select Board Chair: Wendy Reed

Area
  - Total: 14.7 sq mi (38.1 km^{2})
  - Land: 13.4 sq mi (34.8 km^{2})
  - Water: 1.3 sq mi (3.3 km^{2})
- Elevation: 92 ft (28 m)

Population (2020)
  - Total: 4,500
  - Density: 330/sq mi (130/km^{2})
- Demonym: West Newburian
- Time zone: UTC−5 (EST)
  - Summer (DST): UTC−4 (Eastern)
- ZIP Code: 01985
- Area code: 351/978
- FIPS code: 25-77150
- GNIS feature ID: 0618313
- Website: Town of West Newbury, Massachusetts, Official Web Site

West Newbury is a town in Essex County, Massachusetts, United States. Situated on the Merrimack River, its population was 4,500 at the 2020 census.

== History ==
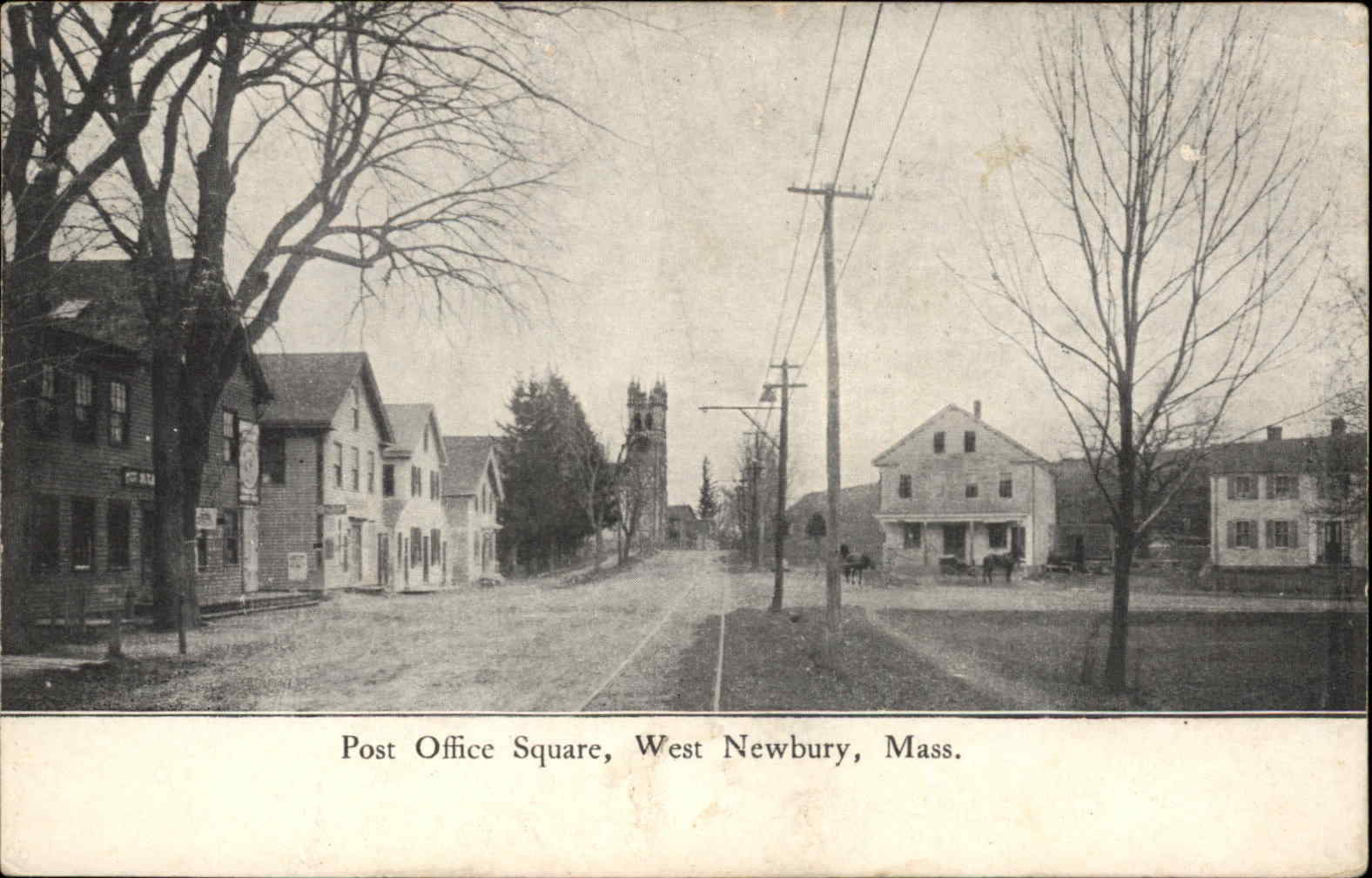
Post Office Square, c. 1905

Originally inhabited by Agawam or Naumkeag peoples, West Newbury was settled by English colonists in 1635 as part of neighboring Newbury. After 15 years of English colonization, a 30 acre section of land around Indian Hill in current day West Newbury was purchased from an indigenous man Great Tom for three pounds.

On February 18, 1819, the General Court of Massachusetts passed an act "to incorporate the town of Parsons." The initial proposals had been made in the late 18th century, but determined resistance from the town of Newbury, which had already lost Newburyport, blocked the measure for decades. On June 14, 1820, the legislature passed another act to change the name to West Newbury.

West Newbury has evolved from a rural farming town into a community facing the issues of balancing development and need for affordable housing against the townspeople's desire to maintain West Newbury's rural charm and character have been in play for at least fifty years. In 1969 local writer Margaret Coit called West Newbury a "hill-framed town that Lowell Thomas once described as 'the Garden of Eden of America,'" saying that as active farming faded away, West Newbury had become, "in its population and pattern of thinking ... virtually a suburb."

Between 1820 and the early 1900s, an active Quaker community existed in West Newbury. The Quaker Meetinghouse stood at what is now 114 Turkey Hill Street and the Quaker Burial Ground, which was established in the 1850s, is located along the Artichoke Reservoir

During the 19th century, West Newbury was home to a vibrant industrial scene. The town was renowned for its comb making industry. Beginning in the 1840s, small home-based comb shops gave way to large-scale factories that produced horn combs and hair adornments. S.C. Noyes, located at 320 Main Street, was the last remaining comb factory in town and shut its doors in 1904. In addition to comb making, a shoe factory operated where the West Newbury Pizza Company currently exists.

The West Newbury Historical Society, a non-profit, maintains the Hills House Museum at the historic William Hills and Hannah Chase House. The home was built in 1780 and the property contains several outbuildings, one of which is a cobbler's shop. The museum boasts a collection of horn combs and adornments manufactured in West Newbury, along with cooper's tools original to the house.

In 1952, Julian D. Steele became the first African-American town Moderator in Massachusetts when he was elected to the position in West Newbury.

The town's oldest continually-operating farm is Long Hill Orchard. The farm has been active since 1896. Today, in addition to the apple orchard, the farm is home to a popular community-supported agriculture program and farm to table dining events.

== Geography ==
West Newbury is a part of Massachusetts' North Shore, as well as the Merrimack Valley regions of the state. It lies along the south banks of the Merrimack River, 10 miles (16 km) upstream from the Atlantic Ocean. The town is located approximately 13 miles (21 km) northeast of Lawrence and 34 miles (55 km) north of Boston. It is bordered by Merrimac and Amesbury to the north, Newburyport to the east, Newbury to the southeast, Groveland to the southwest, and Haverhill to the west. The Rocks Village Bridge across the Merrimack River is the only access to the northern banks of the river in town; there is no direct route into Merrimac and Amesbury.

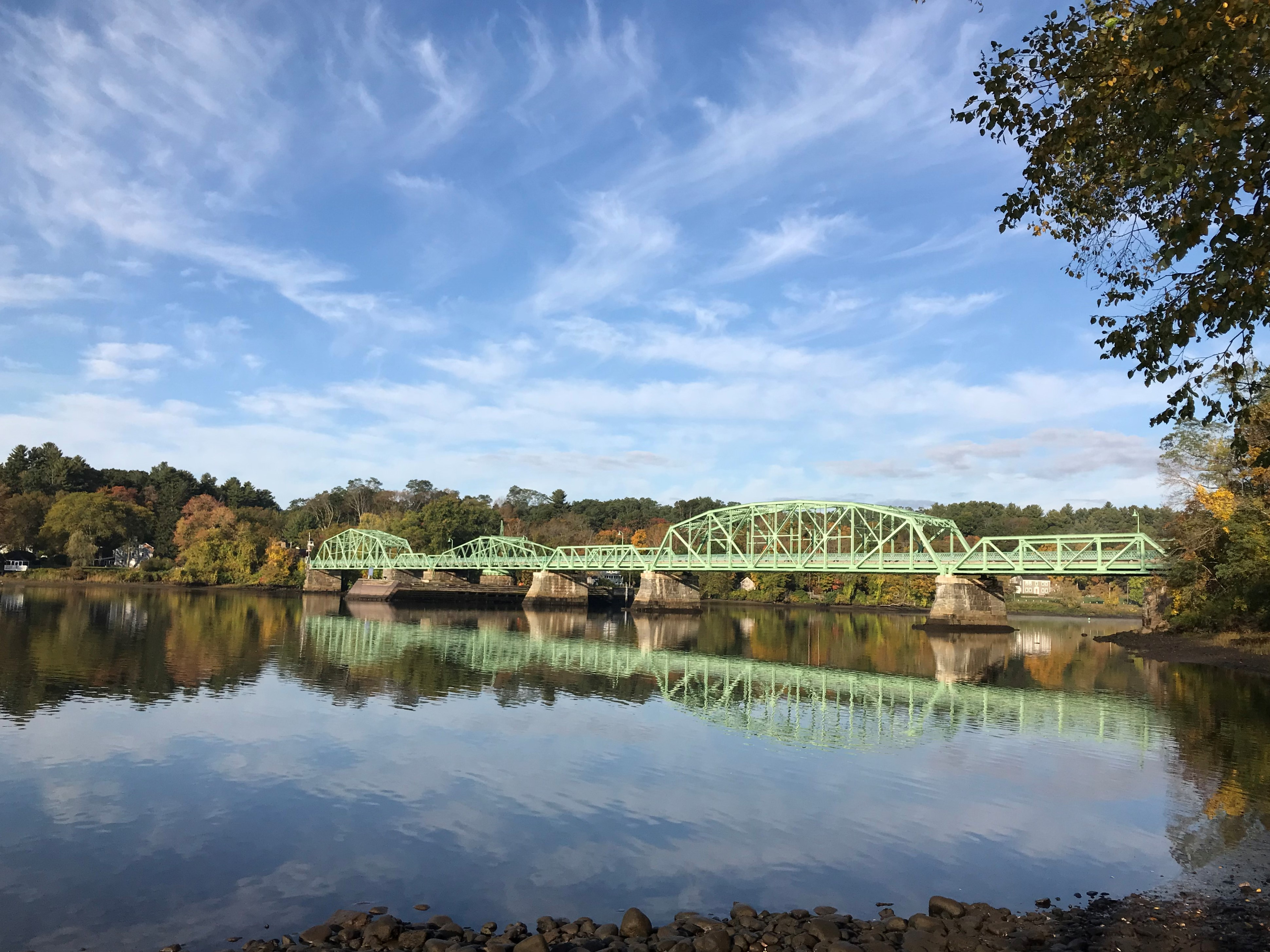
Rocks Village Bridge, West Newbury, 2019

West Newbury is separated from Newburyport by the Artichoke River and its upper and lower reservoirs. Several other rivers and brooks, including the Indian River, flow through the town. The southern corner of town is part of the Crane Pond Wildlife Management Area, and two other protected areas, the Riverbend Recreation Area and Mill Pond Recreation Area, are located in the northern part of town. The town's highest point is on Archelaus Hill in the center of town. Significant efforts have been made by residents to maintain the rural character of the town through advocacy for the preservation of open spaces. West Newbury is well known for its many hills: Pipestave Hill, Archelaus Hill, Brake Hill, Ilsey Hill, Indian Hill, Long Hill and Meetinghouse Hill.

According to the United States Census Bureau, the town has a total area of 14.7 square miles (38.1 km^{2}), of which 13.4 square miles (34.8 km^{2}) is land and 1.3 square miles (3.3 km^{2}), or 8.65%, is water.

== Demographics ==
Historical population
Year	Pop.	±%
1820	1,279	—
1837	1,448	+13.2%
1845	1,560	+7.7%
1850	1,746	+11.9%
1860	2,202	+26.1%
1870	2,006	−8.9%
1880	1,989	−0.8%
1890	1,796	−9.7%
1900	1,558	−13.3%
1910	1,473	−5.5%
1920	1,492	+1.3%
1930	1,549	+3.8%
1940	1,515	−2.2%
1950	1,598	+5.5%
1960	1,844	+15.4%
1970	2,254	+22.2%
1980	2,861	+26.9%
1990	3,421	+19.6%
2000	4,149	+21.3%
2010	4,235	+2.1%
2020	4,500	+6.3%
2024*	4,680	+4.0%
* = population estimate. Source: United States census records and Population Estimates Program data.

In 2000, the town's 4,149 inhabitants were distributed into 1,392 households, and 1,183 families. The racial makeup of the town was 98.5% White, 0.2% African American, 0.5% Asian, 0.4% from other races, and 0.4% from two or more races. Hispanic or Latino of any race were 0.7% of the population. In March 1952, Julian Steele, the sole African-American voter among some 1,500 residents at the time, was elected West Newbury's town meeting moderator. He was the first African-American town moderator in Massachusetts, and remained the only African-American town moderator in the state for at least a decade.

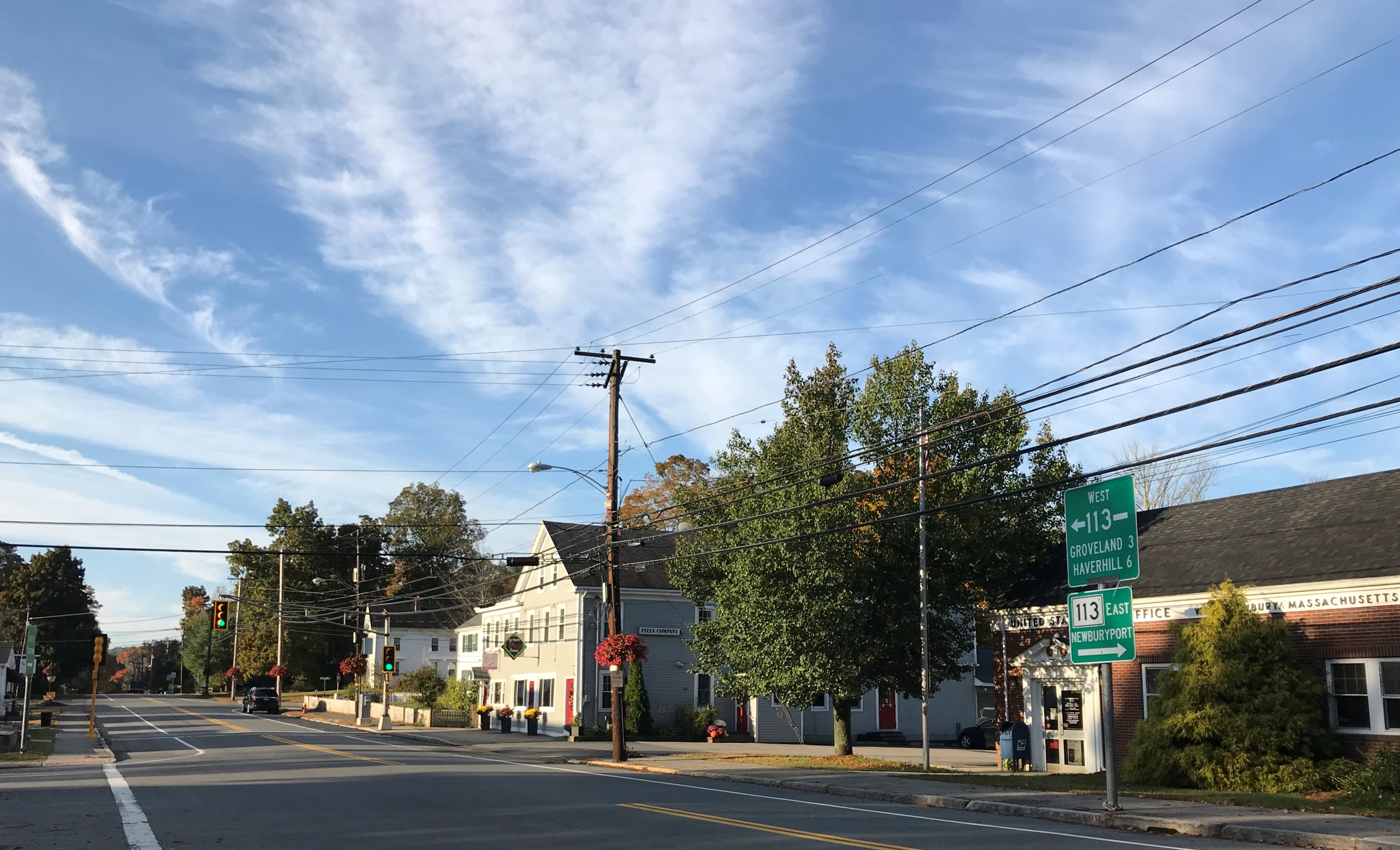
West Newbury Town Center, 2019

Of 1,686 households in 2010, 46.6% had their own children under the age of 18 living with them, 76.8% were married couples, 6.2% were a female householder with no husband present, and 15.0% were non-families. 11.9% of all households were made up of individuals, and 5.2% were individuals living alone who were 65 years of age or older. The average household size was 2.98 and the average family size was 3.25.

By age, 30.0% were under the age of 18, 4.3% from 18 to 24, 27.0% from 25 to 44, 29.9% from 45 to 64, and 8.8% were 65 years of age or older. The median age was 39.6 years. For every 100 females, there were 99.5 males. For every 100 females age 18 and over, there were 93.9 males.

The median income for a household in the town was $164,250, and the median income for a family was $193,951. Males had a median income of $100,670 versus $80,189 for females. The per capita income for the town was $35,323. About 2.8% of families and 4.6% of the population were below the poverty line, including 3.8% of those under the age of 18 and 9.8% of those 65 and older.

== Culture ==
West Newbury and its residents were the models for Popperville, the setting of Virginia Lee Burton's children's story Mike Mulligan and His Steam Shovel. The town hall where the story ends is patterned after West Newbury's Old Town Hall. West Newbury also provided the geographical inspiration for the Mad Scientists' Club series of stories by Bertrand R. Brinley. Portions of John Cena's music video, "Right Now", were shot in West Newbury, with the remainder filmed at Hampton Beach, New Hampshire. In the late summer and fall of 2008, various scenes from Mel Gibson's film Edge of Darkness were shot on Church Street.

West Newbury is home to Emery House, monastery guesthouse and sanctuary of the Society of St. John the Evangelist.

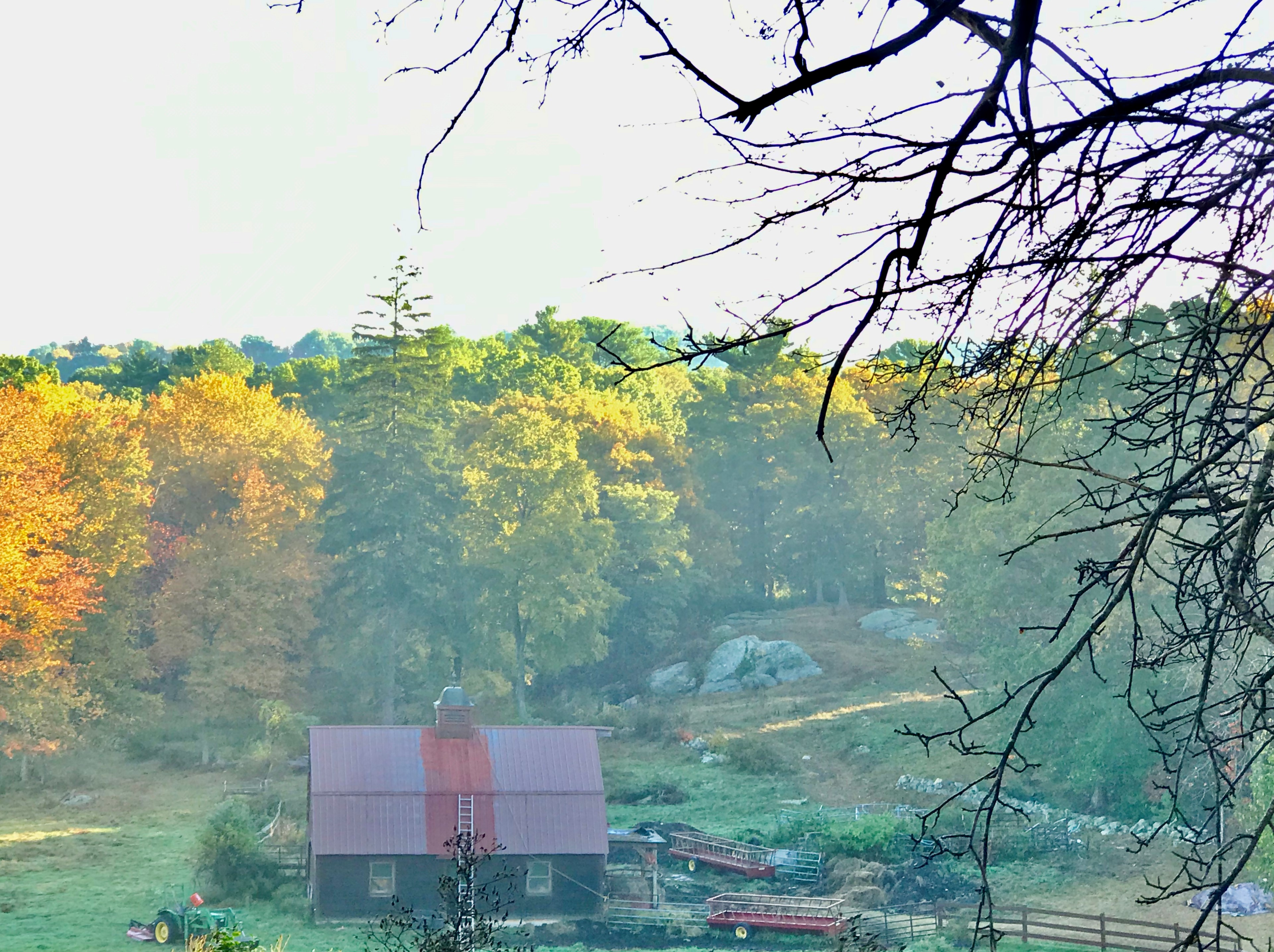
Farm at Crane Neck Street, West Newbury, 2019

Many farms remain in West Newbury. In 2019, the town, in conjunction with Essex County Greenbelt Association, purchased an agricultural preservation restriction for Brown Spring Farm, permanently eliminating rights to develop the farmland and making it affordable for a new farmer. Long Hill Orchard is the town's oldest continually-operating farm. A number of smaller farms exist in West Newbury, including Maple Crest Farm, several Christmas tree farms, and numerous horse stables and equestrian facilities.

The town has two primary outdoor recreational areas, Mill Pond and Pipestave Hill, which offer walking trails, horseback riding trails, as well as space for canoeing, fishing, and kayaking. Equestrian events are regularly held by the West Newbury Riding and Driving Club throughout the riding season. Additionally, the Myopia Hunt Club holds an annual fox hunt through the town during the fall.

Efforts to maintain West Newbury's rural charm have been ongoing; the Town has purchased large swaths of land designated as Open Space by the West Newbury Open Space Committee.

== Education ==
Along with neighboring Merrimac and Groveland, it is part of the Pentucket Regional School District. It also contains the Dr. John C. Page School.

For elementary school, students also have the option of attending River Valley Charter School in Newburyport.

For high school, students also have the options of attending Whittier Regional Vocational Technical High School in nearby Haverhill, and Essex North Shore Agricultural and Technical School in Danvers.

Nearby private schools include The Governor's Academy in Byfield, Phillips Exeter Academy, Phillips Academy, Waring School, Central Catholic High School, St. John's Preparatory School, Pingree School, and Shore Country Day School.

== Transportation ==
Interstate 95 crosses through the eastern corner of town, with an exit lying just over the line in Newbury providing access to the town. Massachusetts Route 113 is the main road through town, roughly parallel to the contour of the Merrimack River. The town lies between the termini of two lines of the MBTA Commuter Rail, the Haverhill Line to the west and Newburyport/Rockport Line to the east. A small airstrip, Plum Island Airport (2B2), is located in neighboring Newburyport; the nearest national air service is in Boston at Logan International Airport.

== Notable people ==
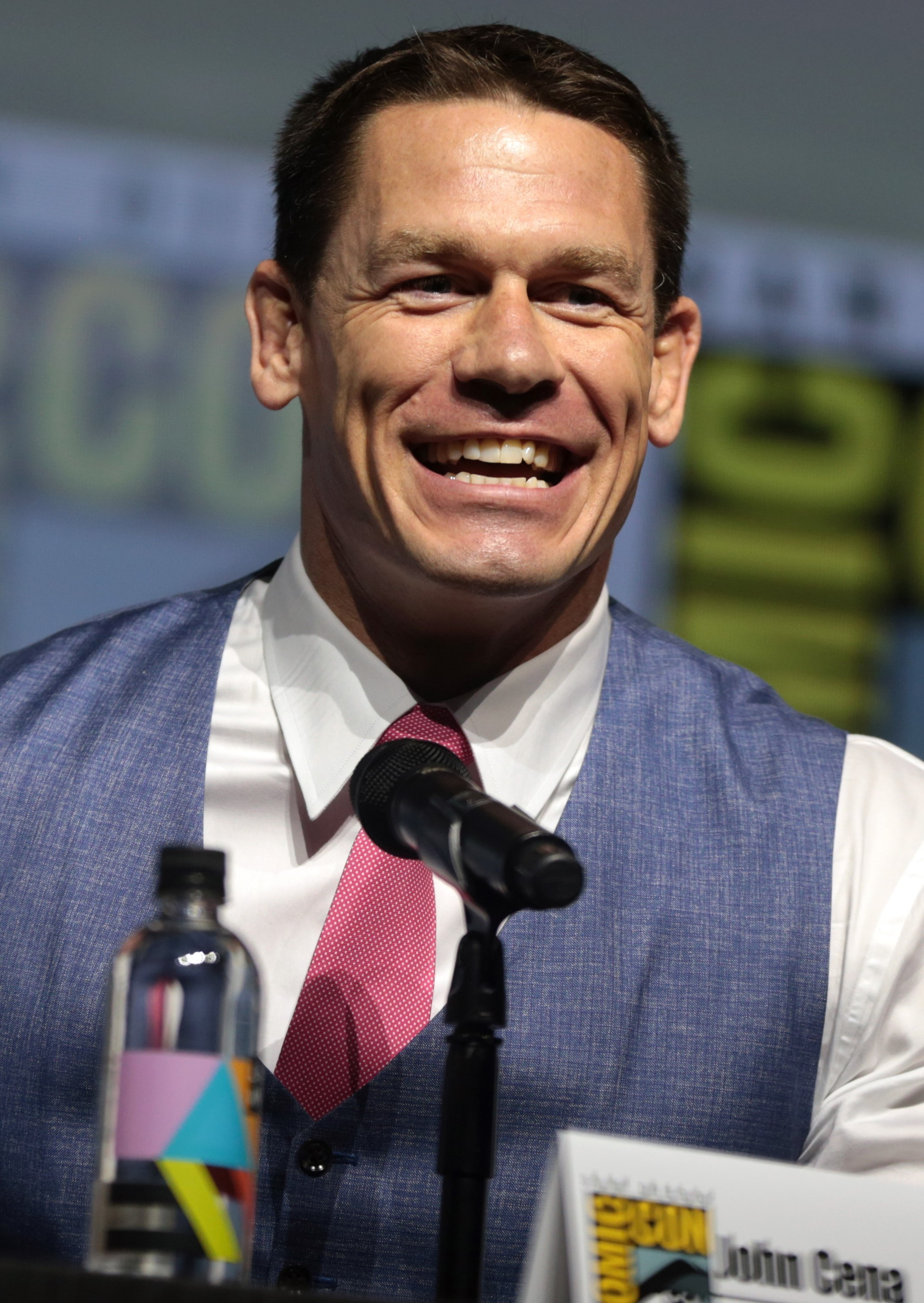
Professional wrestler and actor John Cena in 2018

- John Cena, Former professional wrestler, hip-hop musician, actor and television presenter, currently signed with WWE
- Raymond Abbott, author
- Pat Badger, bassist for the rock band Extreme
- Eben Moody Boynton, inventor of the Boynton Bicycle Railroad, politician
- George Young Bradley, crew member and chronicler of the Powell Geographic Expedition of 1869 exploring the Grand Canyon
- Bertrand R. Brinley, writer of short stories and children's tales, best known for his Mad Scientists' Club stories
- Addison Brown, United States District Judge of the United States District Court for the Southern District of New York, a botanist, and a serious amateur astronomer
- John Appleton Brown, American landscape artist known for scenes of New England in spring
- Cidny Bullens, rock musician and performer of autobiographical "Somewhere Between: A One Wo/Man Show"
- Elmer Burnham, American football player and coach
- Margaret Coit, writer
- Rawly Eastwick, former professional baseball player
- Cornelius Conway Felton, educator, president of Harvard University
- Samuel Morse Felton Sr., railroad executive
- Todd Grinnell, actor
- Edwin A. Grosvenor, historian, author, chairman of the history department at Amherst College, and president of the national organization of Phi Beta Kappa societies from 1907 to 1919
- Justin Haley, Boston Red Sox and Minnesota Twins baseball pitcher turned firefighter
- Mary Ault Harada, record-breaking Masters Class runner
- Roland Hayes, African-American lyric tenor and composer
- Frances Keegan Marquis, first to command a women's expeditionary force, the 149th WAAC Post Headquarters Company, serving in General Eisenhower's North African headquarters in Algiers
- Lenny Mirra, State Representative who served in the Massachusetts House of Representatives
- Steven Pearlstein, journalist, professor, former moderator of the Town of West Newbury
- Benjamin Perley Poore, journalist
- Julian Steele, civil rights and affordable housing activist and first African-American town moderator in Massachusetts
- John Tufts, early American music educator

== See also ==
National Register of Historic Places in West Newbury

- Newell Farm (1846)
- Rev. John Tufts House (1714)
- Samuel Chase House (1715)
- Samuel March House (1695)
- Timothy Morse House (1730)
- Soldiers and Sailors Memorial Building (West Newbury, Massachusetts) (1900)
