= Timothy Morse House =

Historic house in Massachusetts, United States

- U.S. National Register of Historic Places
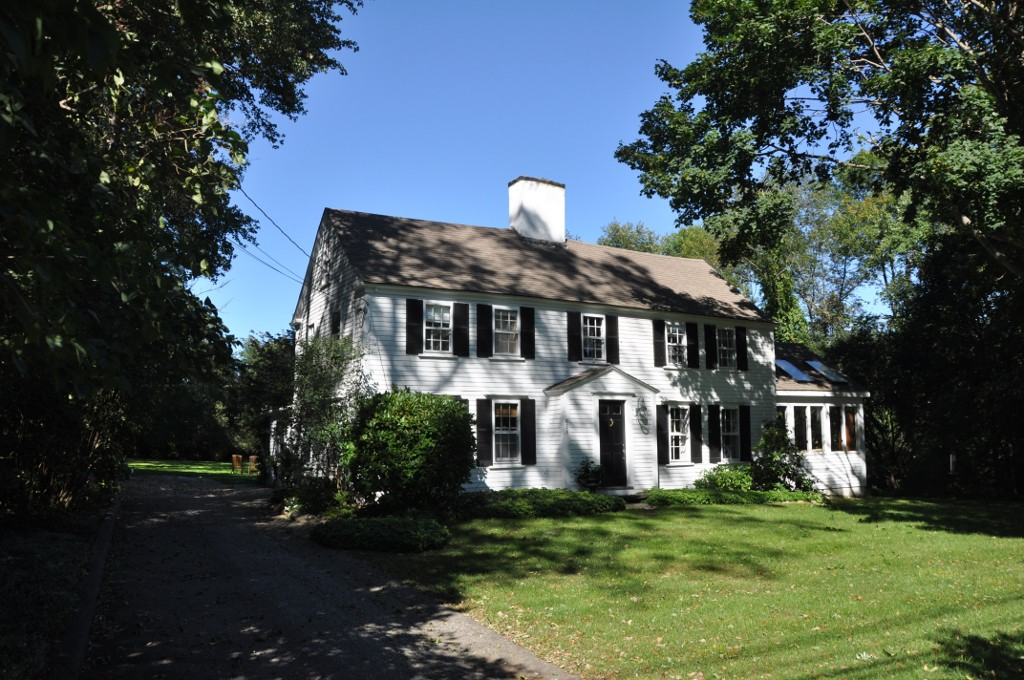

- Location within Massachusetts Location within the United States
- Location: 628 Main Street, West Newbury, Massachusetts
- Coordinates: 42°48′25″N 70°58′6″W
- Built: 1730
- Architectural style: Colonial
- MPS: First Period Buildings of Eastern Massachusetts TR
- NRHP reference No.: 90000271
- Added to NRHP: March 9, 1990

The Timothy Morse House is a historic First Period house in West Newbury, Massachusetts. The 2.5-story wood-frame house was built in stages beginning in 1730. Even though Georgian styling and construction techniques were already taking hold at that time, this house was built in a typical First Period style. The first portion built was to the right of the (now central) chimney, and was followed at a later date by construction of the left side. In the 20th century, one addition was added to the rear of the house, and a relatively modern sun porch addition was added to the right side. The west side front room features a Federal period fireplace.

The house was added to the National Register of Historic Places in 1990.

== See also ==
- List of the oldest buildings in Massachusetts
- National Register of Historic Places listings in Essex County, Massachusetts
