= Samuel March House =

Historic house in Massachusetts, United States

- U.S. National Register of Historic Places
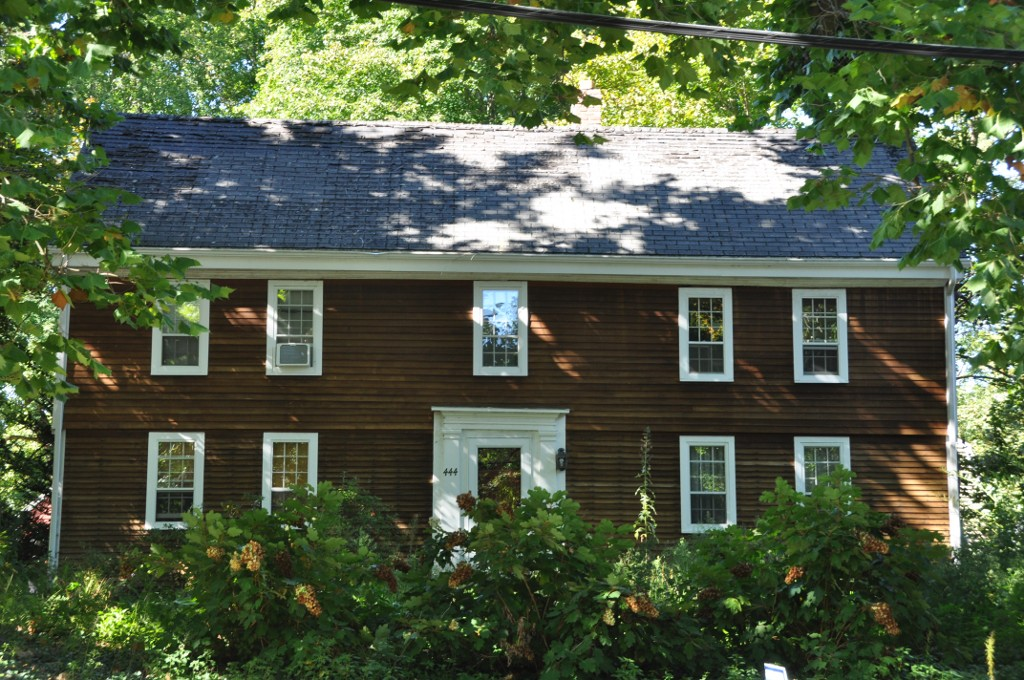

- Location within Massachusetts Location within the United States
- Location: 444 Main Street, West Newbury, Massachusetts
- Coordinates: 42°48′11″N 70°59′7″W
- Built: 1695
- Architectural style: Colonial
- MPS: First Period Buildings of Eastern Massachusetts TR
- NRHP reference No.: 90000272
- Added to NRHP: March 9, 1990

The Samuel March House is a historic First Period house in West Newbury, Massachusetts. The two-story wood-frame house was built in two sections, beginning in the later years of the 17th century. The first portion built was the right three bays of the house, which at that time included a chimney located on the left side. The second portion, also built during the First Period, added the two bays to the left. At some point during the Georgian period, the large central chimney was removed and replaced with two narrow brick chimney, a reflection of changing taste. The front facade is five bays wide, with a slightly larger central bay. The front door is framed by a Georgian surround with pilasters and an entablature.

The house was listed on the National Register of Historic Places in 1990.

== See also ==
- List of the oldest buildings in Massachusetts
- National Register of Historic Places listings in Essex County, Massachusetts
