= Musée Lambinet =

Museum in Versailles, France

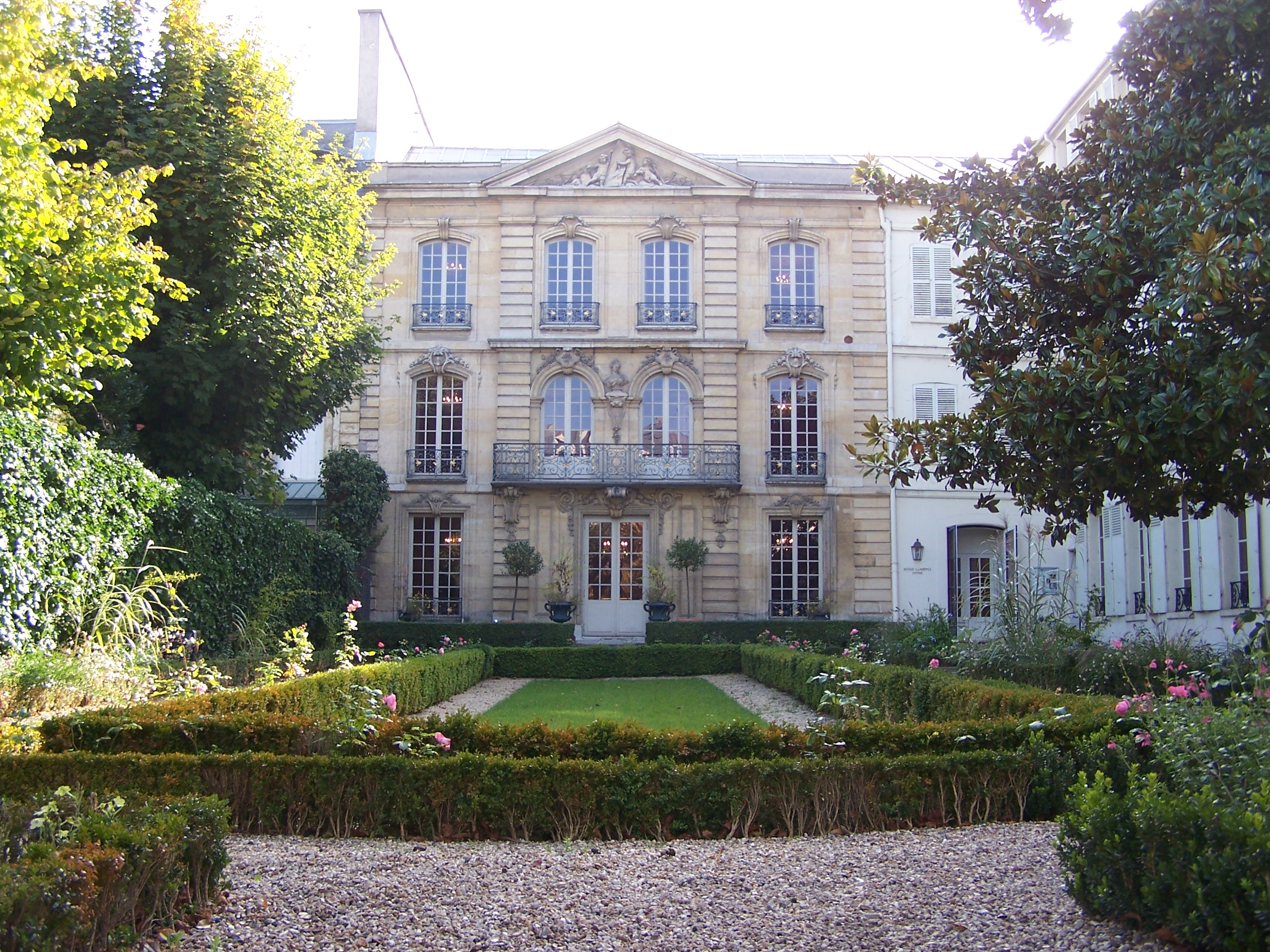
- The Musée Lambinet and its garden
- Established: 1932
- Location: Versailles, France
- Coordinates: 48.8087571°N 2.1301031°E
- Website: http://culture-lambinet.versailles.fr/

The Musée Lambinet is a municipal museum in Versailles telling the history of the town. Since 1932, it has been housed in the hôtel Lambinet, a hôtel particulier designed by Élie Blanchard, built in the second half of the 18th century by a part of the Clagny lake (drained in 1837) and left to the town of Versailles by the heirs of Victor Lambinet (a cousin of the painter Émile Lambinet) in 1929. It has been classed as a monument historique since 1944. Its garden façade has a sculpted pediment representing an allegorical figure of architecture.

== History ==
This private mansion was built for Joseph-Barnabé Porchon in 1751 on a plot of the Clagny pond which dried up in 1737. It is the work of architect Elie Blanchard.

Coming from the East of France, the Lambinet family cut clothes and traded in sheets in Versailles. Victor Lambinet is the son of Jean-François Lambinet, mayor of the city in 1848. Former lawyer, then judge at the court of Versailles, he bought the Hôtel des Porchon in 1852. He occupied it in 1859, with his son and with the latter's wife, Nathalie Chevassus, using one of the wings of the hotel as an apartment building. Nathalie Lambinet is busy putting together collections of works. Charles Vatel made an important donation of works in 1883.

In 1888, the city of Versailles acquired a municipal museum, the Houdon Museum, in the former Foreign Affairs and Navy building.

In 1929, without an heir after the death of her father-in-law Victor, her husband and her son Pierre (in November 1911), Nathalie Lambinet bequeathed the building with her collections to Messrs. Dagincourt and Dénériaz; it is up to them to transform it into a museum.

In 1932, Ville decided to transfer there the works previously kept at the municipal library, former Ministry of the Navy and Foreign Affairs of Louis XV and Louis XVI.

Classified as a historical monument since 1944, it was closed for work from April 18, 2010 to September 18, 2010.

== Collection ==
The museum has 35 rooms, some with period decor, in which collections on the town's history are displayed, such as furniture, ceramics and objets d'art as well as historic plans of the town and paintings, sculptures and other works of art by artists from the town (notably works by Jean-Antoine Houdon).

== Paintings ==
The catalogue lists 542 works, plus 8 deposited at the municipal library and 2 at the hôtel de ville.

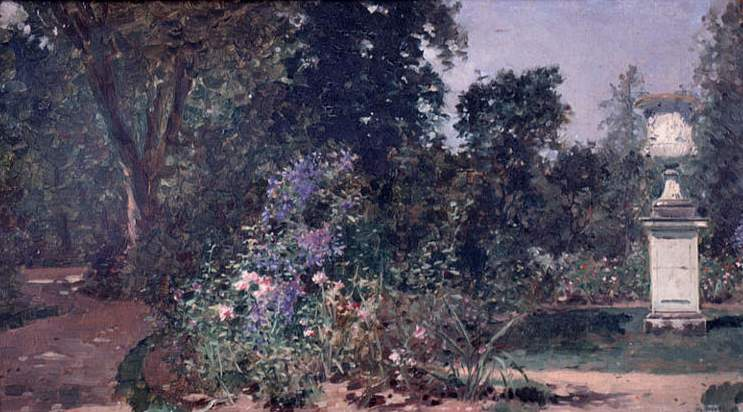
Versailles, The jardin du Roi

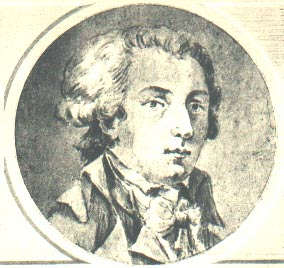
Chénier, Marie-Joseph

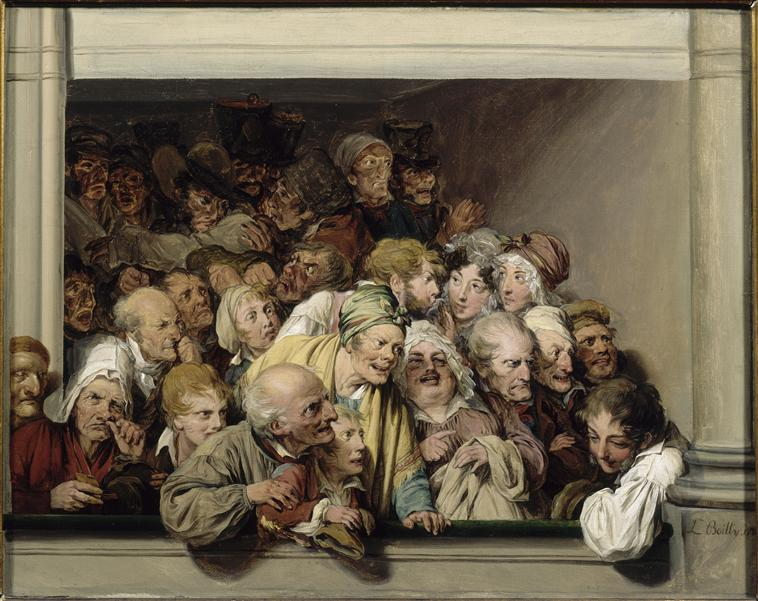
L-L Boilly, A box

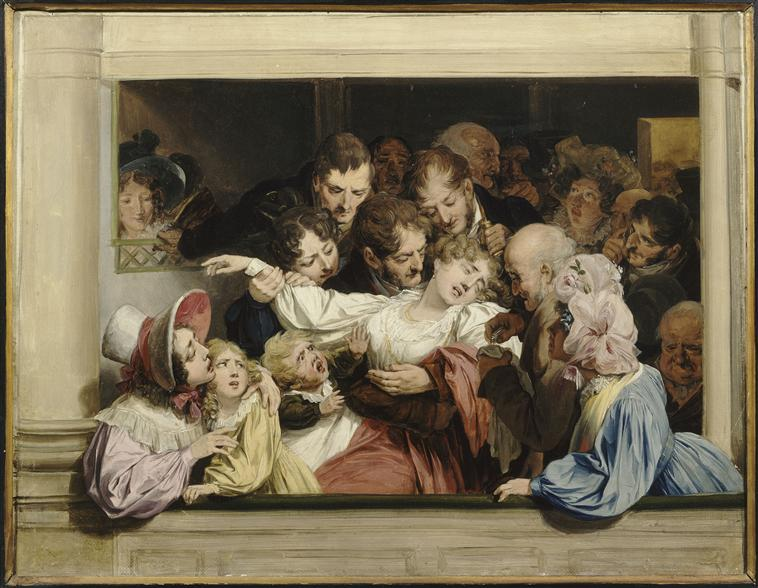
Boilly, The effect of melodrama

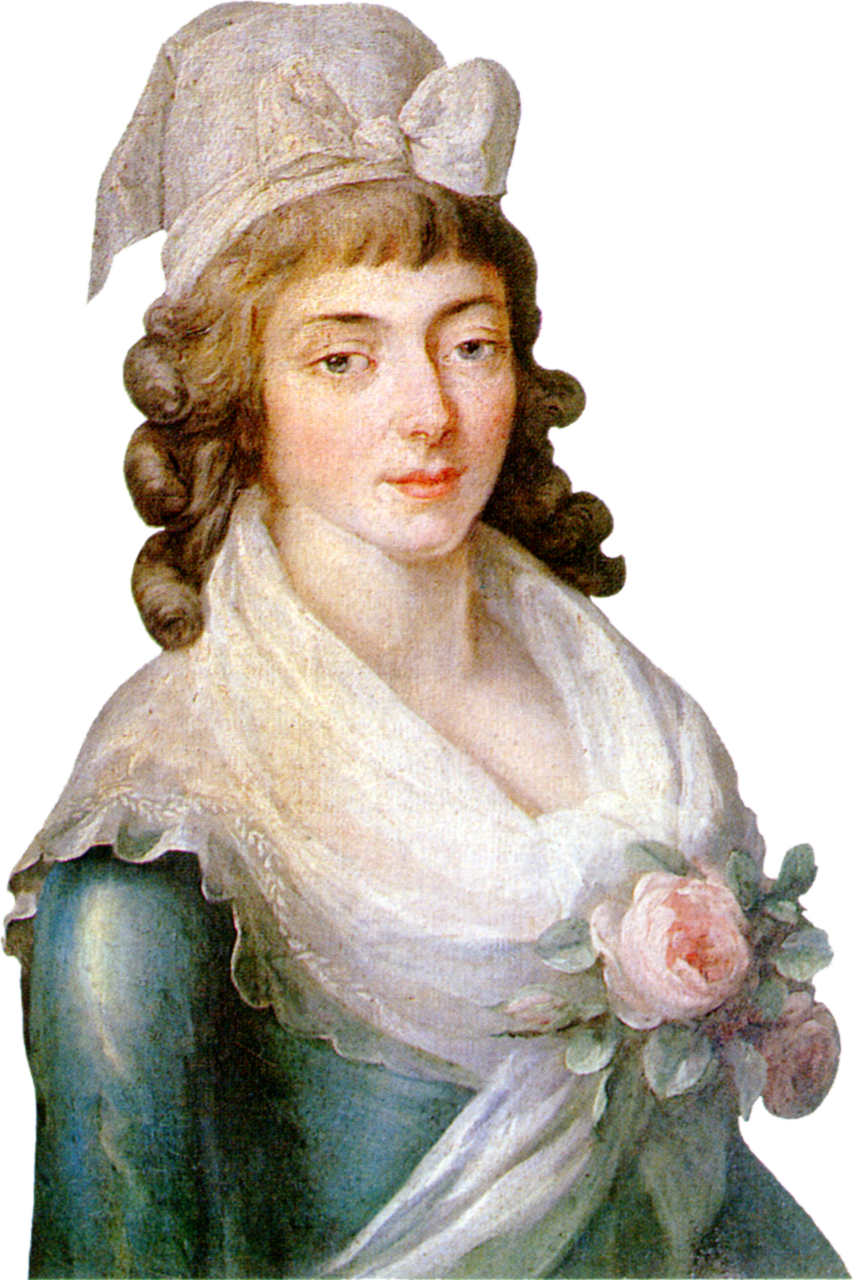
Madame Roland

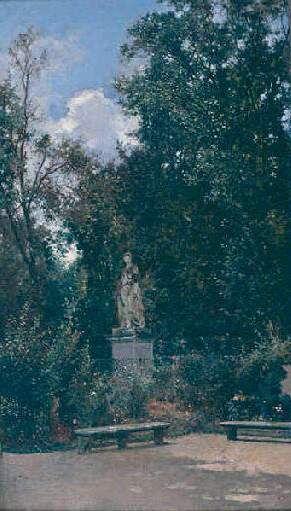
Flowers of the jardin du Roi at Versailles

== Bibliography ==
- (in French) Peintures du musée Lambinet à Versailles, ed. Somogy et Musée Lambinet, 2005, s. l. (Italy), ISBN 2-85056-938-0.
