= Frances Keegan Marquis =

American military leader and women's activist

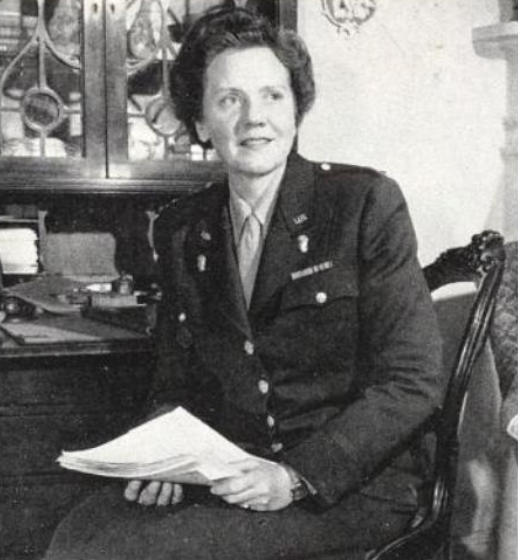
- Frances Keegan Marquis upon her return from service in North Africa in October 1943
- Born: Frances Eleanor Keegan; October 15, 1896; West Newbury, Massachusetts, U.S.
- Died: August 4, 1984 (aged 87); New York City, U.S.
- Occupation(s): Women's army captain, executive in women's organizations, U.N. observer
- Spouses: Samuel Clifton Crumpton (m. 1918; div. 1927) Harry Goshen Marquis (m. 1931; d. 1974)
- Children: none

Frances Keegan Marquis (October 15, 1896 — August 4, 1984) was an American women's army captain, World War II veteran, and feminist activist. In 1943, she became the first commander of a women's expeditionary force, the 149th WAAC Post Headquarters Company, which served in General Eisenhower's North African headquarters. Before her military service, she held management posts in women's organizations; afterwards, she did volunteer work for women's groups, including serving as a United Nations observer for Altrusa International.

== Early life, education, and marriage ==
Frances Eleanor Keegan was born on October 15, 1896, in West Newbury, Massachusetts, the third daughter among the four children of John L. Keegan and Margaret E. Costello. Her parents were first generation Irish: the Costellos from Tipperary and the Keegans from Kildare. John Keegan had a career as superintendent of machine tool manufacturing. At age eighty, he came out of retirement to help the war effort in World War II.

Marquis graduated from high school in West Newbury in 1911. Because she was only fourteen, Simmons College would not allow her to matriculate without a one-year wait. She graduated with a BA in 1916, the youngest in her class. Her college yearbook listed Marquis among the class' Brightest, Best Student, and Most Promising. Marquis later took courses in economics at the University of Illinois and philosophy at Columbia University. In 1931 she met and married Harry Goshen Marquis, a ginger-ale salesman at the time; it was a second marriage for each of them. Articles profiling his wife called him a New York businessman and World War I veteran left home alone to carry on as she went off to war.

== Career in women's organizations ==
Marquis held a number of executive positions, often relating to women's issues or women's improvement. She managed Boston's Franklin Square House, a non-profit residence hotel providing housing and social services for some 700 unmarried women students and wage earners. At Franklin Square House, women in a wide range of professions from all over country lived under one roof.

From 1919 through 1933, Frances Keegan Marquis fundraised for and then was a manager at The Town Hall in New York City. The Town Hall was an offshoot of New York's women's suffrage movement, specifically the League for Political Education. This wealthy and influential group determined to construct a public forum for debate that would overcome the kind of "ignorance and prejudice" that impeded the women's vote. The Town Hall hosted not only important speakers (including birth control advocate Margaret Sanger, who was arrested when attempting to speak there in November 1921) but also many musical performances, for which Marquis served as concert manager.

Later, between 1935 and 1941, Marquis served as the assistant director in charge of education and recreation programs of the American Woman's Association. Founded by Anne Morgan and other prominent New Yorkers, the American Woman's Association was created as a place where a working woman with drive and energy could network and develop leadership skills. In Morgan's view, although no women of the time were equipped to head a large corporation, "in time there will be plenty of such women—it requires only evolution." By 1930, when it constructed its own building in New York City, the association (which was non-sectarian and was said to include every nationality) had a membership of some 4,000, representing over 150 businesses and professions. Along with a roof garden, numerous parlors, meeting rooms, and residential space, the association's building featured a premier fitness center including a swimming pool.

In 1941, Marquis became executive secretary of the Women's City Club of New York. Like The Town Hall, the club had roots in the suffrage movement and owned a series of impressive clubhouses in Manhattan, moving during Marquis' tenure to the same building that housed the all-male City Club. The club advocated for civic betterment and particularly women's issues such as women's employment, birth control, and maternity care. Its leaders included Eleanor Roosevelt. As war raged abroad during Marquis' time as executive secretary, the Women's City Club turned to women's duty to contribute to defense and the war effort.

== Military service during World War II ==
On July 20, 1942, Frances Keegan Marquis joined the first Women's Army Auxiliary Corps (WAAC) officer training class at the Fort Des Moines Provisional Army Officer Training School. Chosen from some 30,000 applicants, she was one of 440 in her class, of whom 90% had attended college and 99% had successful civilian careers. She said she joined because "for eight years ... this country had neglected its obligations and 'when there was an opportunity to do something, I felt that I who had talked so much about it, had to do it.'" Upon graduation on August 29, 1942, at age 46 Marquis entered the military and was assigned to WAAC headquarters in Washington, D.C.

=== Command of first expeditionary WAACs ===
Over the 1942 Christmas holidays, Marquis became the first woman to command a troop train, which carried the newly-formed 149th WAAC Post Headquarters Company now under her command from the Second WAAC Training Center in Daytona, Florida, to the New York area. From there, this company of almost 200 sailed to North Africa, reporting to General Dwight Eisenhower's headquarters in Algiers on January 27, 1943. Women of the 149th, who volunteered for service abroad, comprised a hand-picked cadre of linguists and specialists who assumed secretarial, postal, switchboard, and other duties. Describing the 149th, Ernie Pyle stated, "When a WAC takes over a switchboard from a soldier, efficiency goes up about 1000 percent."

As the first to command an American women's expeditionary force, Frances Keegan Marquis became the subject of considerable attention. In the summer of 1943, she met with England's King George VI, discussing the work of the WAACs and British-American relations after the war. Nationwide news reports carried her photo; discussed her appearance (curly brown hair in a bob, twinkling blue eyes), demeanor ("dignity of assurance", "undertone of confidence", emphasis on a sense of humor), feminine attributes (nose powdering, lemon pie making); and mentioned her prior career.

Deployment abroad compounded start-up problems facing the WAACs. Upon arrival in Algiers, it was discovered that the 149th's vehicles had been issued to a male unit and items ranging from kitchen equipment to typewriters had disappeared. Army historian Mattie Treadwell stated that an obvious problem was the auxiliary system itself. It was infeasible to deny Army commanders the ability to command the women working for them and to apply differing rules for women. Army men in a war zone received such additional benefits as extra pay, government life insurance, veteran's medical care if injured. WAACs in the war theater did not. Pressing issues were incapable of resolution within a meaningful time frame. A staff member commented, "The Corps was placed in the position of a small businessman who overnight was told he must increase his business more than eight times, and to do it at once even before he knew what he was to produc[e], out of what materials, when or how the product was to be made, and with practically no organization to assist."

=== Transition to Women's Army Corps ===
Although headlines asserted that Marquis was a popular commander, this was not universally so. Hoping for a familiar officer, at least some of her troops would not have chosen her: they were "quite surprised at the designation of this 'stranger.'" According to Sergeant Vida Ganoni's memoir, a little over two weeks after their arrival in Algiers, on February 11, 1943, an announcement of promotions caused an uproar. Those not promoted felt that Marquis' decisions were based on favoritism, not ability.

With the July 1, 1943 enactment of legislation converting the Women's Army Auxiliary Corps to the Women's Army Corps (WACs), the women were given the summer to decide whether to apply to join the Army upon the September 1943 changeover. During this time, changes such as more dispersed housing assignments and the unit's absorption into the 6666th or 6667th Hq Co, WAC—which applied to all women in the theater—caused significant unhappiness in the ranks that identified themselves as close-knit 149ers. The final break occurred when a popular sergeant was suddenly relieved of her duties. Some sided with the sergeant, others with the commander: the "unity of the 149th collapsed".

Treadwell's Army history attributed the situation to administrative difficulties and the lack of a WAAC staff director for the theater—a one-time mistake. When General Eisenhower learned that a large number of the 149th did not plan to continue as WACs, he requested that a highly competent senior WAAC officer be sent immediately. In view of the troops' state of mind, this officer, then-Major Westray Boyce, acted swiftly. "The previous company officers and key cadre were returned to the United States in a body, since it appeared impossible to place individual responsibility or to restore the women's lost confidence; all later proved successful in a variety of duties in the United States." Noting "the almost insurmountable difficulties attendant upon life and conditions in an active theater of war" that confronted Marquis upon arrival in North Africa, Colonel R.Q. Brown, commander of the Headquarters Special Troops, highly recommended Marquis for any future position, staff or command.

=== Recruiting tour ===
Upon her return to the States in October 1943, Marquis was assigned to assist in the WAC recruiting drive with speeches and interviews describing her time in North Africa. Myriad problems ranging from counterproductive messaging to active obstruction from the War Manpower Commission afflicted WAC recruiting, but a slander campaign proved a largely unstoppable blow. Although many sources spawned and fed bad jokes and ugly rumors about military women, contemporaneous and historical accounts have focused on the work of syndicated columnist John O'Donnell. According to an Army history, even with its hasty retraction, O'Donnell's June 8, 1943, "Capitol Stuff" column did "incalculable damage". That column began, "Contraceptives and prophylactic equipment will be furnished to members of the WAACS, according to a super secret agreement reached by the high ranking officers of the War Department and the WAAC chieftain, Mrs. William Pettus Hobby…." This followed O'Donnell's June 7 column discussing efforts of women journalists and congresswomen to dispel "the gaudy stories of the gay and careless way in which the young ladies in uniform … disport themselves…." Of particular concern for Marquis and the 149th, that column repeated the admittedly unsubstantiated falsehood that large numbers of WACs had been sent home pregnant from North Africa.

While still abroad, Marquis participated in a counteroffensive with newspaper and radio interviews discussing her troops' life in the military, including their commitment as volunteers, qualifications and training, assignments, long work hours, supervised social life, and housing in a convent. In one of her first press conferences upon returning to New York, Marquis told fascinating stories of the WACs in North Africa and responded with a strong denial when asked "how many WACs were really sent home for disorderly conduct and pregnancy." In truth, the only pregnant 149er was married to an Army officer—she had not discovered her condition until after she arrived in the theater, at which point she returned home. Marquis was sent on a well-publicized nationwide tour, speaking to women's groups, WAC trainees, college women, and business groups about the WACs' overseas experiences.

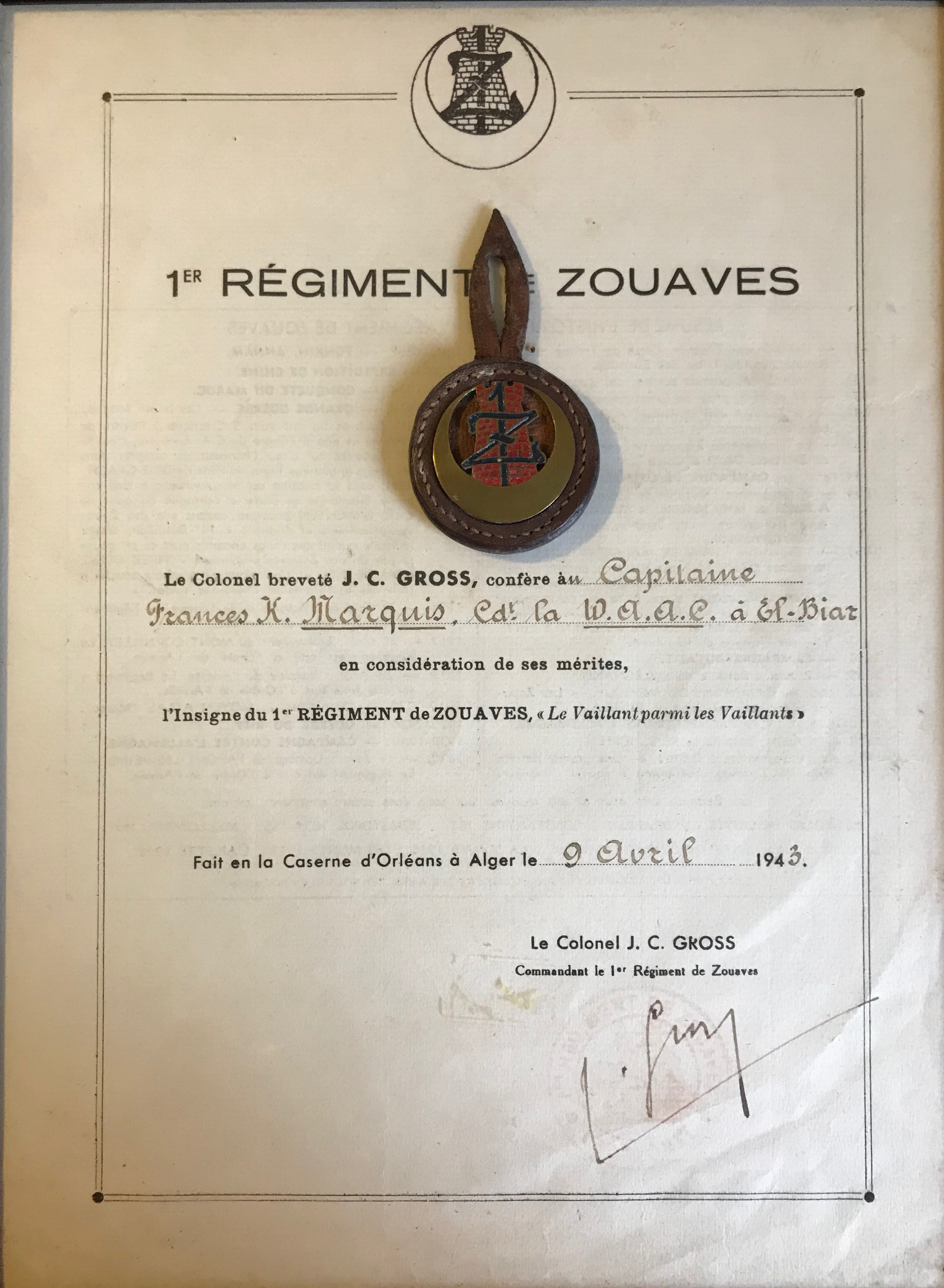
Insignia of 1st Regiment of Zouaves, awarded to Capt. Frances Marquis - Courtesy of West Newbury Historical Society

Marquis later attended the Command and General Staff School. She was awaiting reassignment when, at the war's end, she was discharged late in 1945.

=== Medals ===
On April 9, 1943, Colonel J.C. Gross, commandant of the 1st Regiment Zouaves ("valiant of the valiants") awarded Marquis the medal insignia of that regiment, making her an honorary member. Around the time Marquis' WAACs arrived in Algiers, Zouave forces (with roots as local North Africans in the French Army), were the first to stop the Nazi advance at Medjez-El-Bab in Tunisia. Vastly outnumbered and equipped with World War I era rifles, the Zouaves beat back German and Italian forces in a 36-hour battle. When this North African victory helped turn the tide for the French, the Americans promised them modern supplies. By November 1943, a modernized, American-equipped French Army—notably including the Zouaves—was ready to invade Europe from North Africa.

During this period, the WAACs played a part in strengthening ties with the French: in July General Henri Giraud, commander of the French forces, reviewed Marquis' troops (finding them "inspiring") and later in the summer of 1943, the WACs and their French counterparts (one of whose officers was the wife of Colonel Gross) paraded together with a 1st Regiment Zouave color guard. Along with her WAC and overseas service ribbons, Marquis' Zouave medal became part of her uniform.

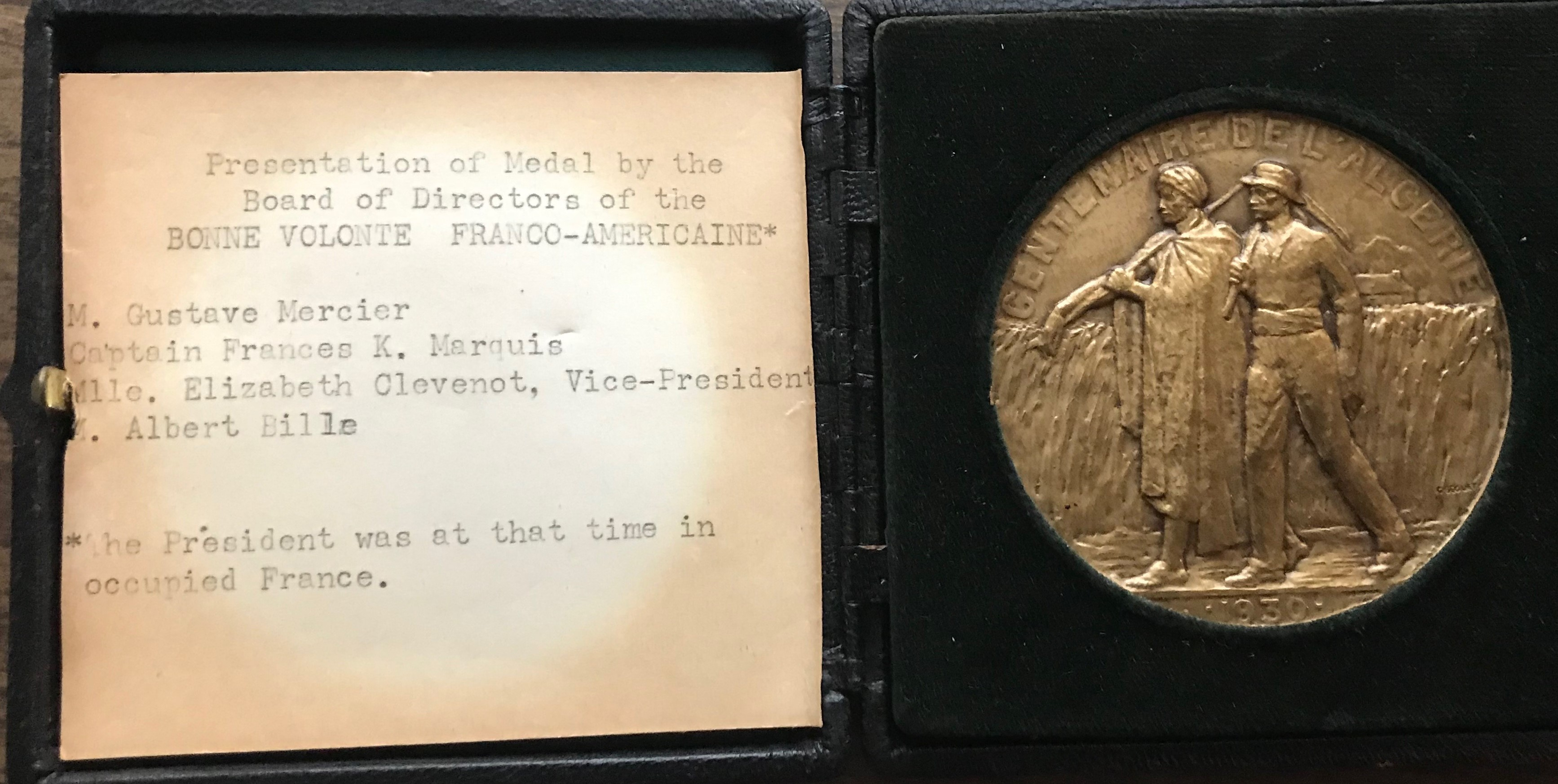
Bonne Volontḗ Franco-Amḗricaine Medal, awarded to Capt. Frances Marquis - Courtesy of West Newbury Historical Society

On the eve of her departure from Algiers in late September 1943, the Franco-American Goodwill Society (Bonne Volontḗ Franco-Amḗricaine) held a luncheon to honor Marquis. At this event, the society's board of directors presented her with a medal honoring her contributions to French-American friendship.

== Post-war volunteer work ==
After leaving the military, Marquis undertook volunteer work. Having previously served Altrusa (an organization of professional women's clubs focused on community service) as president of the New York City chapter and publicity chairman of the international organization of clubs, Marquis became Altrusa International's official United Nations observer and traveled about the country giving speeches on the workings of the United Nations. She served in that role, participating with U.N. observer status, for seven years. Marquis was also active in such organizations as Camp Fire Girls, serving as the president of the Council of Greater New York and representing New York on the National Council.

== Death and legacy ==
Frances Keegan Marquis died on August 4, 1984, at her home in Manhattan, leaving no immediate survivors. She maintained ties to friends in her home town of West Newbury throughout her life, however. Marquis became a life member of the West Newbury Historical Society in 1960 and later donated some of her papers and medals to that organization. In 1987 the West Newbury Historical Society mounted an exhibit of her military artifacts.
