= Frank Henry Shapleigh =

American painter (1842–1906)

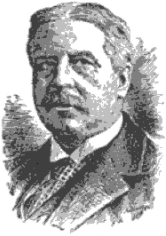
- Born: March 7, 1842; Boston, Massachusetts, U.S.
- Died: May 30, 1906 (aged 64); Jackson, New Hampshire, U.S.
- Burial place: Forest Hills Cemetery
- Occupation: Painter

Frank Henry Shapleigh (March 7, 1842 – May 30, 1906) was an American landscape painter known for his contributions to White Mountain art.

== Biography ==
Born in Boston, Massachusetts, he was based at the Crawford House Artist's Studio in Carroll, New Hampshire, and later in Jackson, New Hampshire. He attended Boston's Lowell Institute. During the American Civil War, he served in the 45th Massachusetts Infantry Regiment of the Union Army, seeing combat in North Carolina in 1862–63.

After the war, Shapleigh trained in Europe from 1866 to 1868, studying under Émile Lambinet in Paris. Based in Boston, he maintained a studio in Crawford Notch, New Hampshire, and summered at the Ponce de Leon Hotel in St. Augustine, Florida.

His work is held in the permanent collections of Dartmouth College's Hood Museum of Art, Plymouth State University's Museum of the White Mountains, the University of Florida's Harn Museum of Art, White Mountain Museum & Gallery; North Conway NH and the University of Miami's Lowe Art Museum.

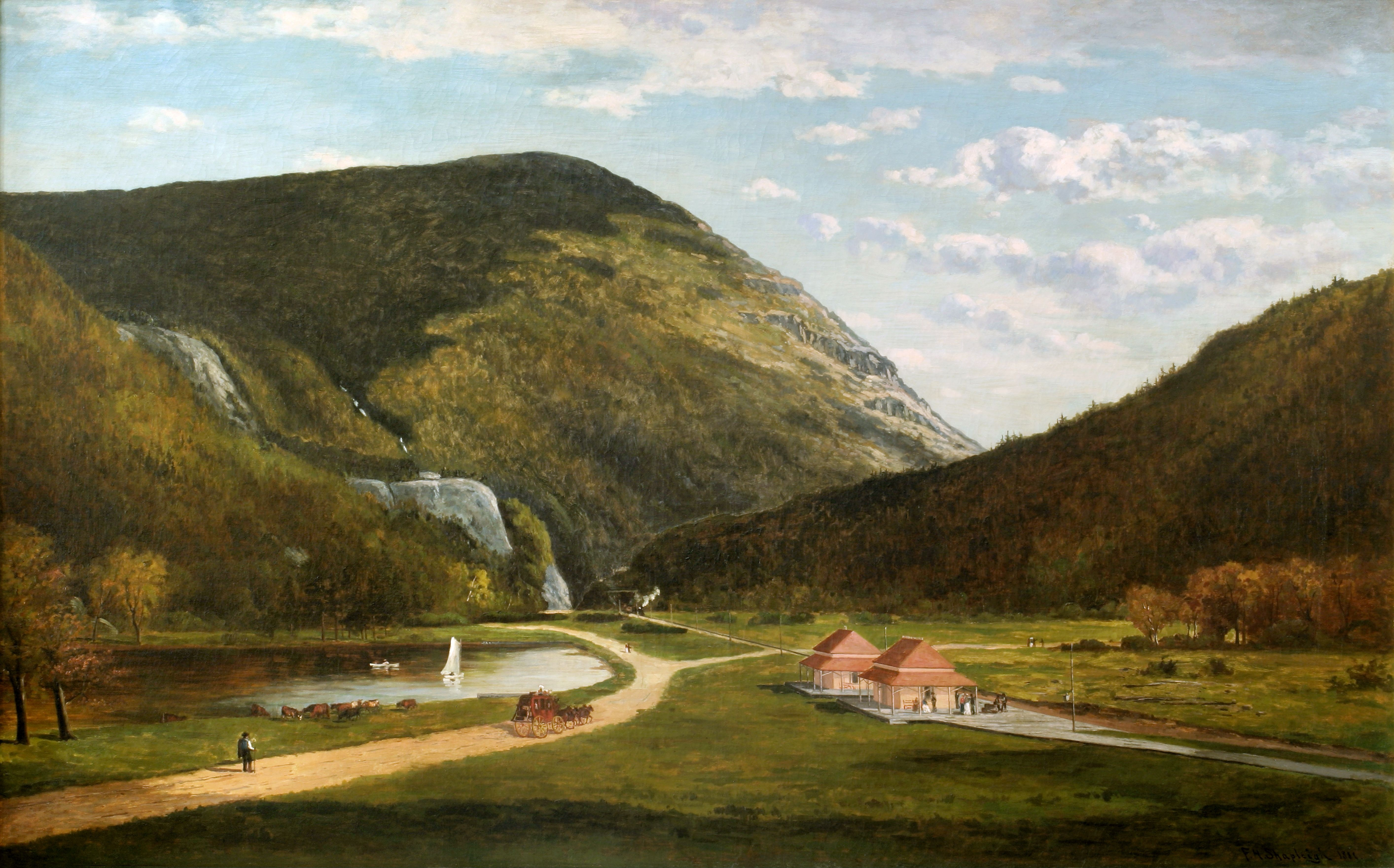
The Crawford Notch.
