= Julian Steele =

American politician

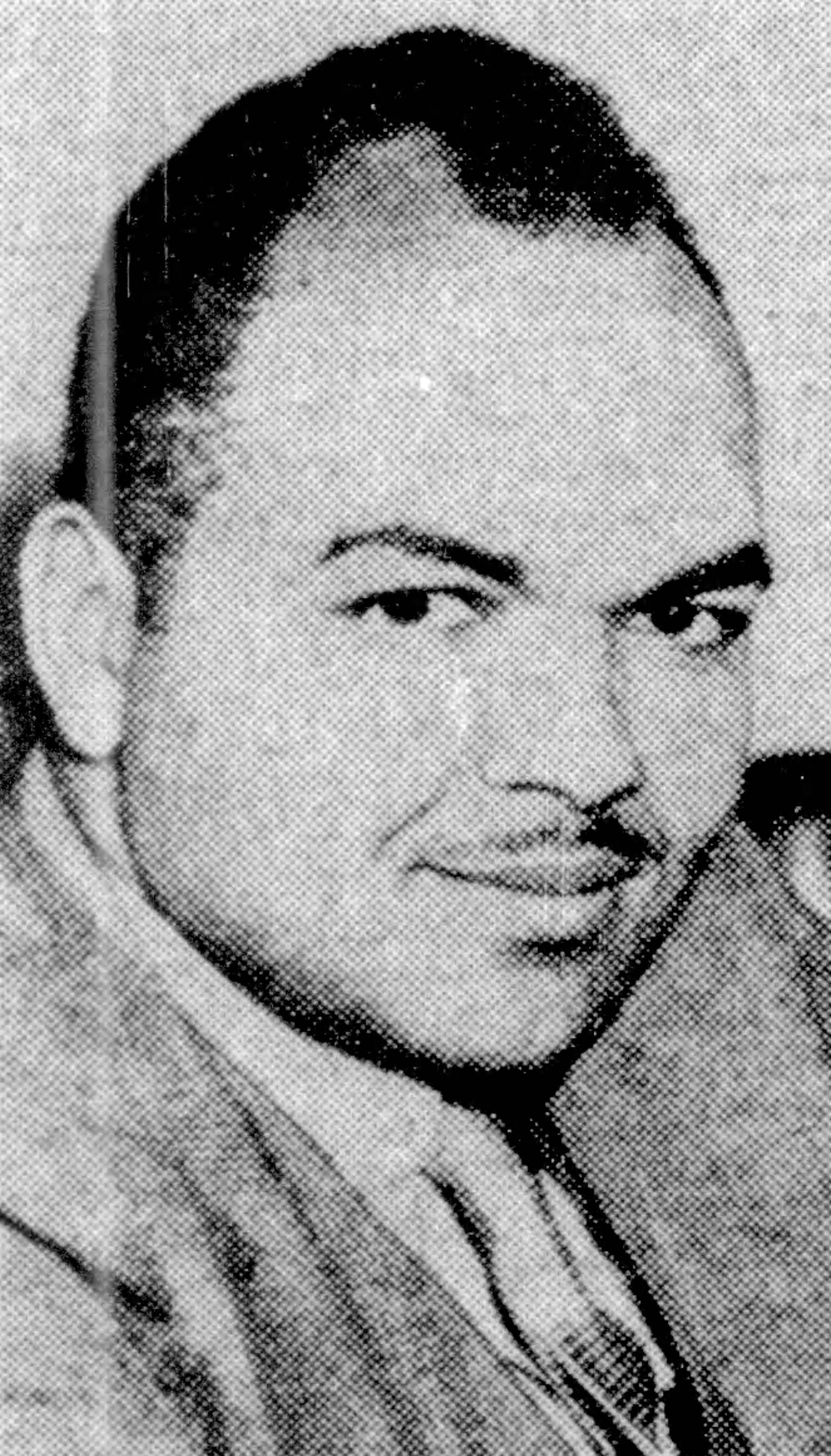
- Steele c. 1938
- Born: Julian Denegal Steele; October 20, 1906; Savannah, Georgia, U.S.
- Died: January 17, 1970 (aged 63); West Newbury, Massachusetts, U.S.
- Occupations: Social worker, politician, civil rights activist, church leader
- Political party: Socialist (before 1940); Republican (after 1940)
- Spouse: Mary (Polly) Bradley Dawes (m. 1938; d. 1970)
- Children: Emilie Dawes Steele

Julian Denegal Steele (October 20, 1906 – January 17, 1970) was an American social worker, activist, and federal, state, and local office holder—often the first black person to hold such a post in New England.

== Early life and education ==
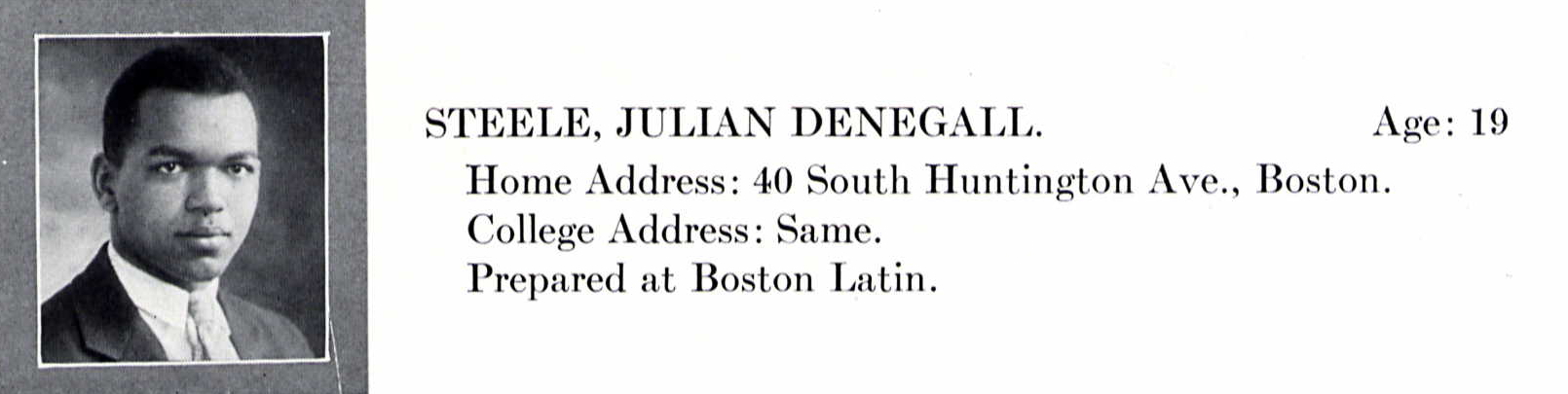
Steele in the Harvard University yearbook, 1929

Steele was born on October 20, 1906, in Savannah, Georgia, home to his father's family for several generations. His father, Alexander McPherson Steele, was a postal worker. Around age seven, Steele moved with his family to Boston, Massachusetts his mother's hometown. Steele’s mother, Minnie Sarah Ellis Steele, was the daughter of a Jamaican minister, Rev. Alexander Ellis, who served as a pastor in Boston. Steele’s brother, Joseph Alexander Ellis Steele, was a noted jazz musician. Steele attended Boston Latin School, graduated cum laude from Harvard University in 1929, and pursued graduate studies in social work in New York City. For the 1929-1930 academic year he received a fellowship from the Rosenwald Fund.

== Social work career and mixed marriage ==
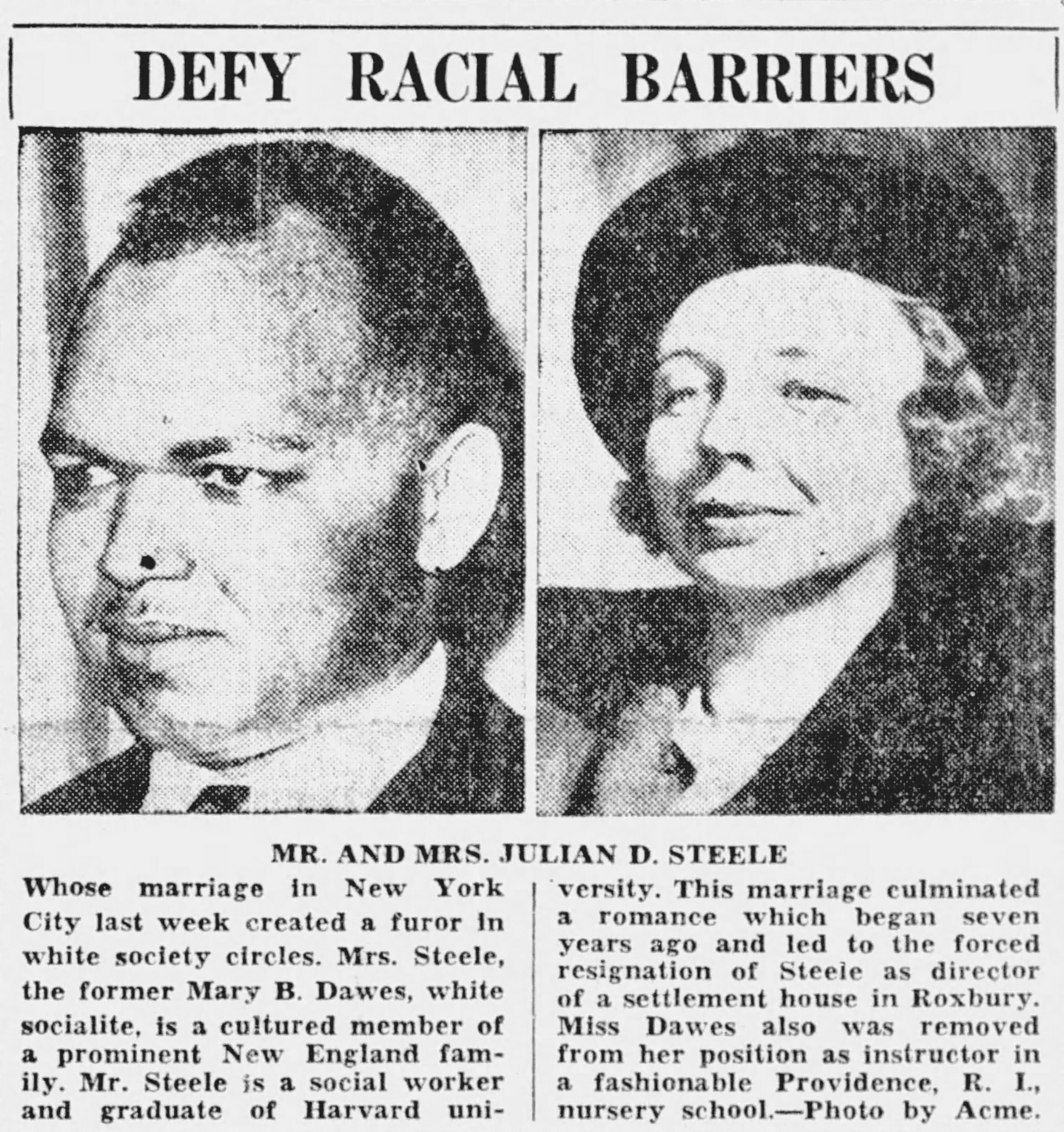
Steele and his wife, Mary B. Dawes, in The Chicago Defender, May 14, 1938

Upon completion of his studies, Steele became director of Boston's Robert Gould Shaw Settlement House in Roxbury. There he met his future wife, Mary Bradley Dawes (the granddaughter of former vice president Charles G. Dawes), who worked in the settlement's day nursery. Controversy associated with his impending mixed-race marriage forced Steele to resign his position at the Shaw Settlement. Students at Ward Belmont College in Nashville, Tennessee, where Mary Dawes studied prior to obtaining her BA from Boston University in early childhood education, hung two “Negroes” in effigy to protest the engagement.

Following a discreet six-year courtship, the quiet May, 1938 wedding in New York City between a "Negro social worker" and the "daughter of an old New England family" generated nationwide press. In Congress, Mississippi Senator Theodore Bilbo commented that Mary Dawes "appears to be sustained in her mad insane determination to mingle blood impregnated with the highest genetic values of the Caucasian and the blood of an African whose racial strains have dwelt for six thousand years or more in the jungles of a continent.” Notwithstanding the controversy, in 1939 Julian Steele began work heading up Boston's new Armstrong Hemenway Foundation, focusing on affordable housing. He was a member of the Socialist Party at this time, but left it by 1940 due to perceived racism in the party.

== Life in small town New England: Massachusetts' first black town moderator ==
In 1943, Julian and Mary Steele purchased a farm in West Newbury, Massachusetts, a predominately rural North Shore town within commuting distance of Steele's work in Boston. They moved to that town when their daughter, born in 1944, was a baby. Steele, who established a dairy herd for his working farm, said that the countryside held appeal as a good place to have a family. He also stated,"In West Newbury a man can be an avid admirer of Senator Joe McCarthy and an equally avid advocate of racial and religious tolerance."

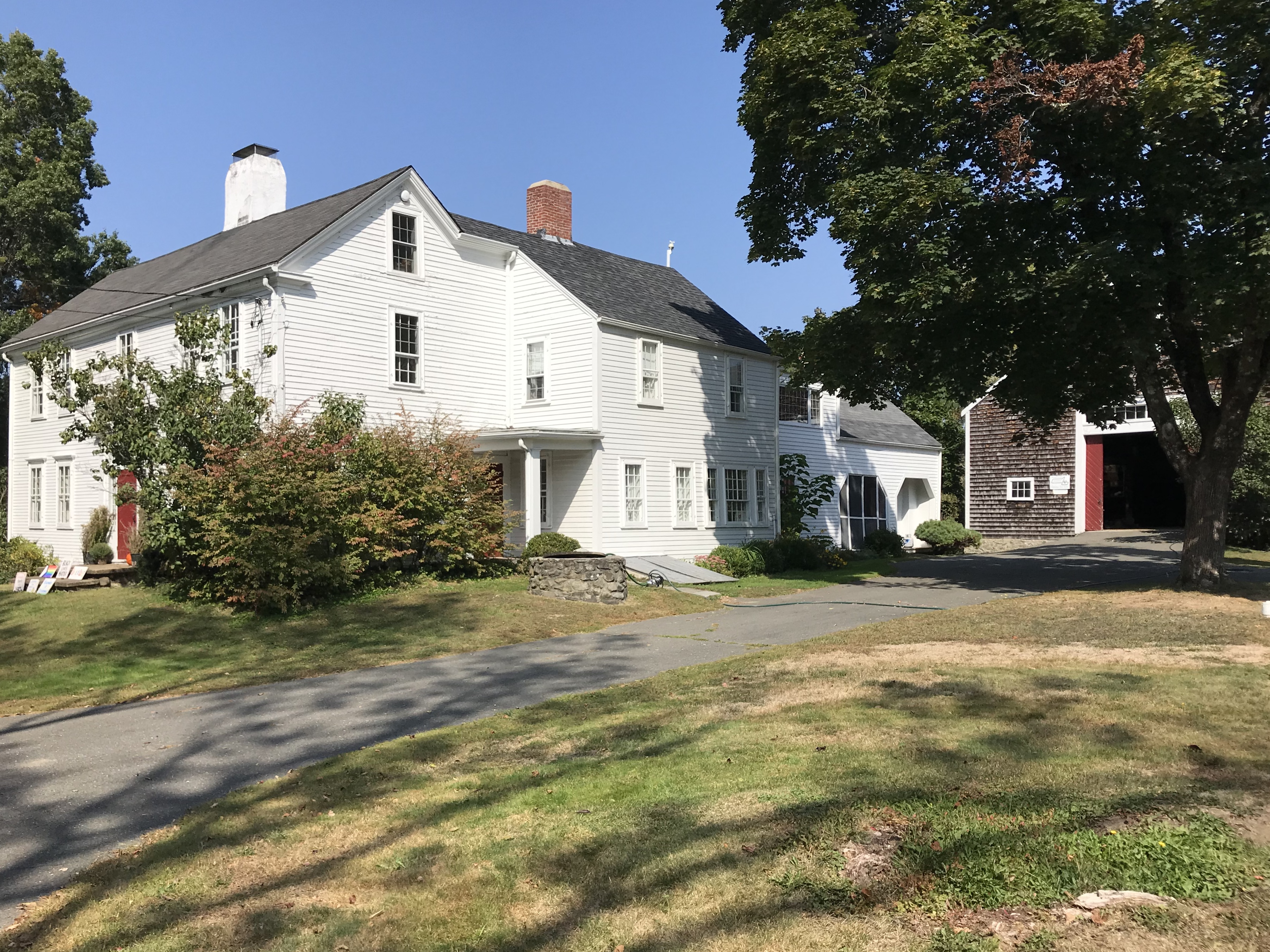
Farm of Julian & Mary (Polly) Dawes Steele purchased in 1943

In March 1952, Julian Steele, the only black voter among some 1,500 residents, was elected West Newbury's town meeting moderator. He was the first black town moderator in Massachusetts. Townspeople credited him with "elevating the cultural life of the community." Steele was a founder and the moderator of West Newbury's "wide-awake Town Hall Forum," a weekly lecture series and he participated in the town's summer theater. Steele was instrumental in the decision of renowned African-American tenor Roland Hayes to purchase a summer home in West Newbury on Crane Neck Street, just up from the Steele farm. Hayes, in turn, performed at local events including a charity concert in West Newbury town hall.

For at least a decade, Steele was Massachusetts' only black town moderator. In the direct democracy of New England town meeting, the moderator serves to supervise, guide, and referee townspeople's debate leading to votes determining the course of municipal budgets and agendas for the coming year. At the time of Steele's election, local writer Margaret Coit described town meeting as West Newbury's "favorite indoor sport," where free speech was the rule and "controversy was cherished for its own sake." Steele served as West Newbury's moderator until his death.

== Career as a state and federal official ==
Julian Steele held a number of state and federal posts, often as the first black person in the position. He was appointed to the Massachusetts Parole Board in 1954. During his tenure, Massachusetts conducted an evaluation of the death penalty. The state Attorney General supported repeal, those opposing capital punishment asserted that it usually reflected race or class prejudice, while the minority who favored it cited deterrence. The parole board was divided: Steele favored abolishment, saying "the state should not take a human life because the state cannot create it." When Steele, the sole remaining Republican on the parole board, was passed over for reappointment in favor of a Democratic candidate, civic and religious groups protested the alleged politicization of the board.

In 1960, Steele was appointed assistant administrator of the U.S. Housing and Home Financing Agency, with responsibility for New England and New York. Massachusetts Senator Leverett Saltonstall said at the time that Steele was the first black person appointed to such a high position in that agency. Steele became the Deputy Commissioner of Urban Renewal in Massachusetts' Department of Commerce and Development in 1965. When he was appointed commissioner of Massachusetts' new Department of Community Affairs in 1968, Steele became the first black person to head an agency in the state. At Steele's swearing in, Governor John Volpe called Steele the “ideal man to carry forth with the development, renewal and rehabilitation of the communities in the Commonwealth and the mobilization of state forces to fight poverty.”

== Civil rights advocacy and church leadership ==
Steele's assertion, "Human progress can be measured largely in terms of acceptance of difference as interesting and our common humanity as profoundly important" informed his activism in civic and religious fields. Throughout his life, he advocated for a number of causes, among them civil rights and affordable housing.

A 1937 profile in The Crisis, the magazine of the National Association for the Advancement of Colored People, cataloged Julian Steele's activities as a young professional ranging from organizing aid for Ethiopia to working with Boston planners on housing—all in furtherance of his "cardinal principle . . . that Negroes must cooperate with whites." Steele held several leadership posts with the NAACP beginning in the 1940s, including president of the Boston Branch. In 1958 he was elected president of Boston's Urban League.

Julian Steele also assumed leadership positions in church groups. Active in his church in West Newbury, he became moderator for the Congregationalists of Essex County and then vice-moderator for Massachusetts. In 1954 Steele was named the first black moderator (principal layman) of the Massachusetts Congregational Christian Conference, a denomination descending directly from the Puritans.

== Death and legacy ==
On January 17, 1970, Steele died of a heart attack in his sleep at home in West Newbury. After services in Roxbury attended by some 800 mourners, Steele was buried in West Newbury. Steele was the subject of an appreciation in the Congressional Record, and at its 1971 annual town meeting, the Town of West Newbury read a proclamation stating in part that "in the passing of Julian Steele who served the Town as Moderator, the Town has lost a valuable and faithful public servant who has left an example of a life worthy of the emulation of all."

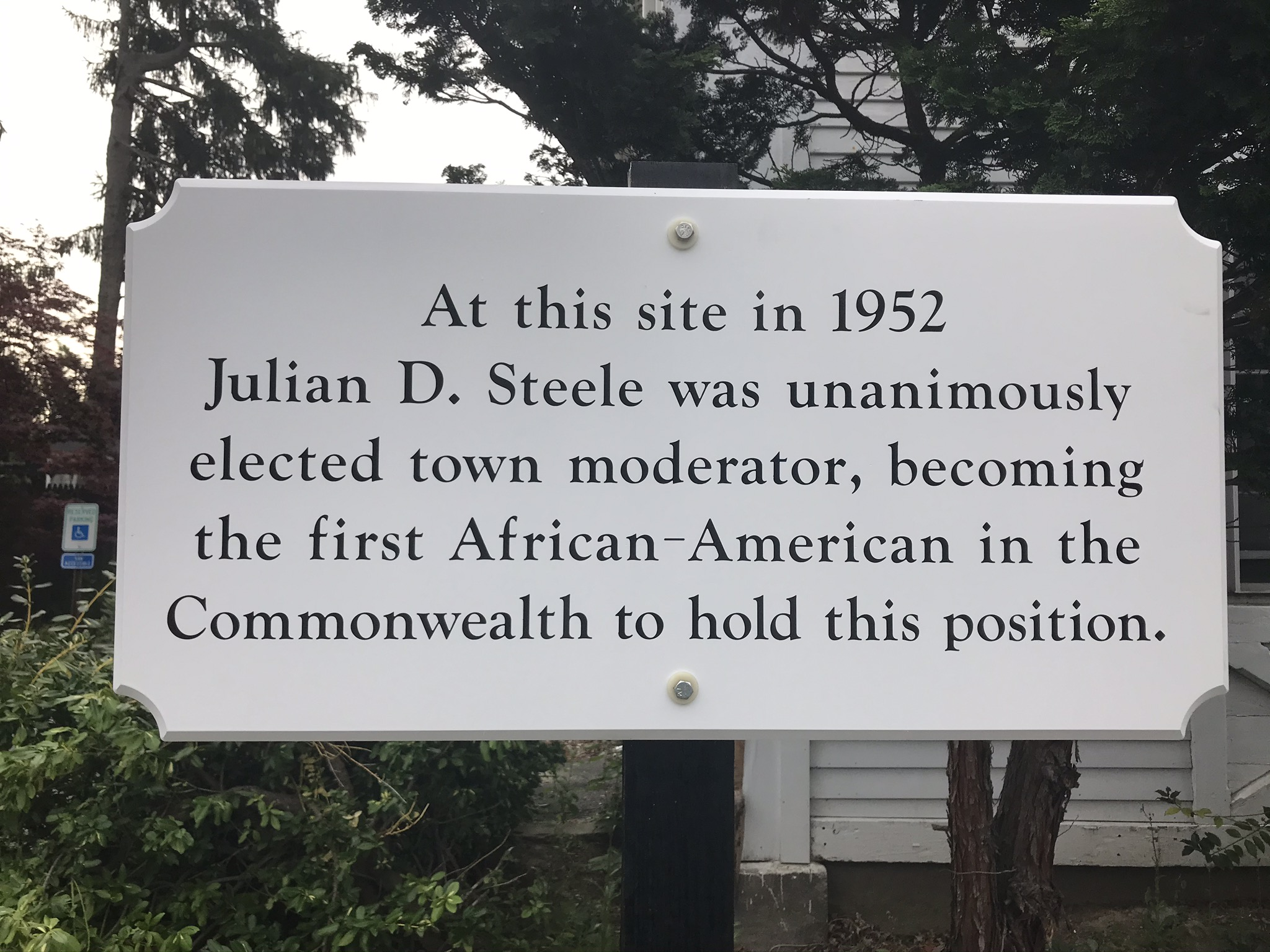
Julian D. Steele Historic Marker, West Newbury, MA

An elders' housing center in Melrose, Massachusetts, was named after Steele in the months following his death. A 1950's-era housing project in Lowell, Massachusetts, since razed, was also named for him. In 2019, the Town of West Newbury voted to erect a historical marker in Steele's honor in front of Town Hall. A collection of his papers is housed in the Archival Research Center at Boston University.
