= Rev. John Tufts House =

Historic house in Massachusetts, United States

- U.S. National Register of Historic Places
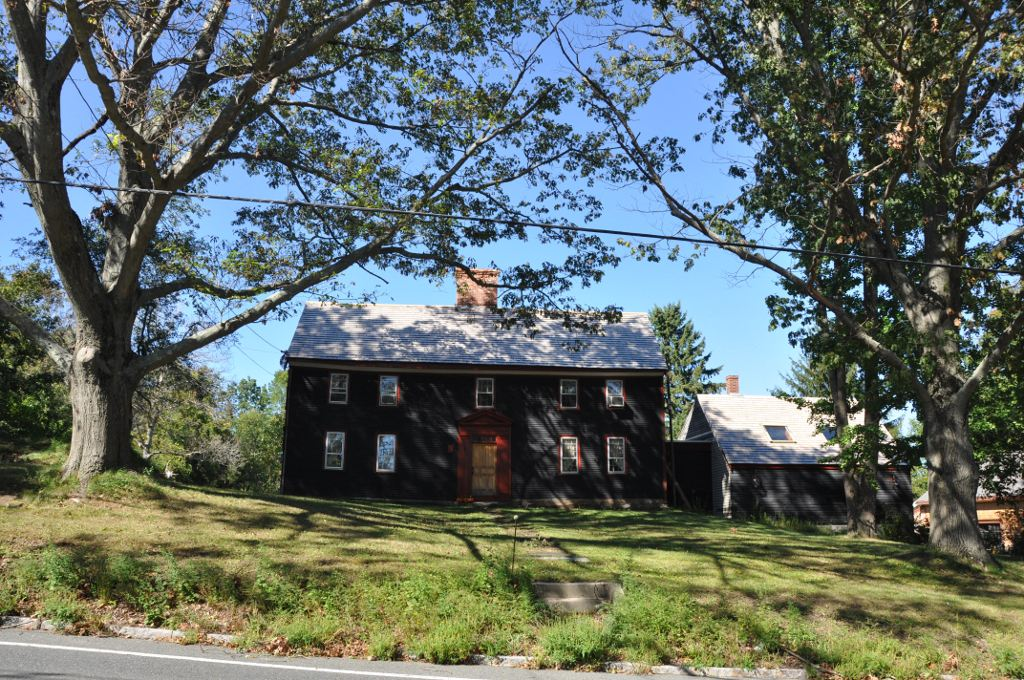

- Location within Massachusetts Location within the United States
- Location: 750 Main Street, West Newbury, Massachusetts
- Coordinates: 42°48′29″N 70°57′24″W
- Built: 1714
- Architectural style: Colonial
- MPS: First Period Buildings of Eastern Massachusetts TR
- NRHP reference No.: 90000270
- Added to NRHP: March 9, 1990

The Rev. John Tufts House is a historic First Period house in West Newbury, Massachusetts. It was the house of John Tufts (1689–1750), an important early American music educator. The 2 1/2-story central chimney building is framed entirely in oak, and its main block was built all at once (unlike many First Period homes, which were often built in stages) in c. 1715. It is five bays wide, with an enlarged central bay, where the door is located. The doorway is framed by Georgian period pilasters and pedimented entablature. There is a 20th-century saltbox-style addition across part of the back of the house, and a gabled addition on the right that is connected to the main house by a narrow inset section.

The house was added to the National Register of Historic Places in 1990.

== See also ==
- List of the oldest buildings in Massachusetts
- National Register of Historic Places listings in Essex County, Massachusetts
