= Crawford House Artist's Studio =

- U.S. National Register of Historic Places
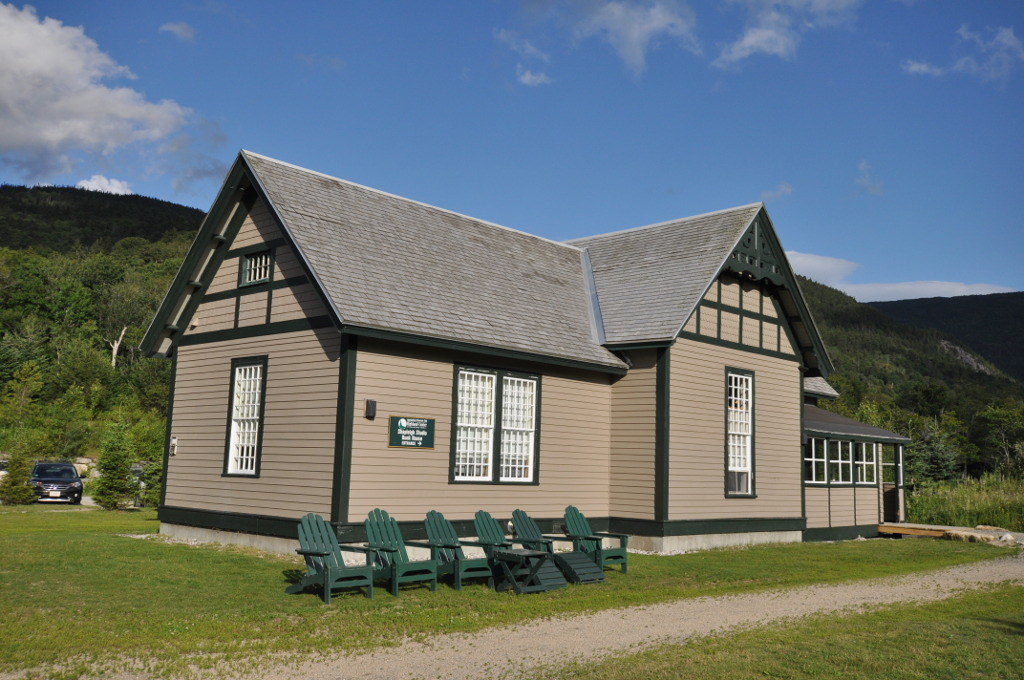

- Location within New Hampshire Location within the United States
- Location: AMC Highland Center, United States Route 302, Bretton Woods, New Hampshire
- Coordinates: 44°13′11″N 71°24′40″W
- Area: less than one acre
- Built: 1880
- Architectural style: Stick/Eastlake
- NRHP reference No.: 85002193
- Added to NRHP: September 12, 1985

The Crawford House Artist's Studio (also known as the Frank Shapleigh Studio, and now as the Shapleigh Bunk House) is a historic studio building in Carroll, New Hampshire. Built in 1880 as an artist summer house and studio, it is a good local example of Stick style architecture. The building was listed on the National Register of Historic Places in 1985. It has been rehabilitated by the Appalachian Mountain Club (AMC), and now serves as a bunkhouse as part of its Crawford Notch Highland Center.

== Description ==
The former Shapleigh Studio is located on the campus of the AMC Highland Center, just north of the top of Crawford Notch on the west side of U.S. Route 302 in Bretton Woods. It is located between the center's main parking area and its main building. It is a single-story wood-frame structure, with a gabled roof and clapboarded exterior. Each of its long sides has a central projecting section with a cross gable. The gable ends have Stick style woodwork applied to the walls, and some of the gables have additional decorative woodwork at the gable peaks. Windows are generally large 16-over-16 sash, although there are smaller windows in the side gable ends. An enclosed shed-roof porch extends across the southern part of the western facade; this is also where the main entrance is located.

The studio building was built in 1880 to serve as studio space for Frank Henry Shapleigh, a noted painter of White Mountain art. Shapleigh lived and worked in this studio until 1894. As part of its restoration by the AMC, it was relocated to a new foundation.

== See also ==
- National Register of Historic Places listings in Coos County, New Hampshire
