= Soldiers and Sailors Memorial Building (West Newbury, Massachusetts) =

- U.S. National Register of Historic Places
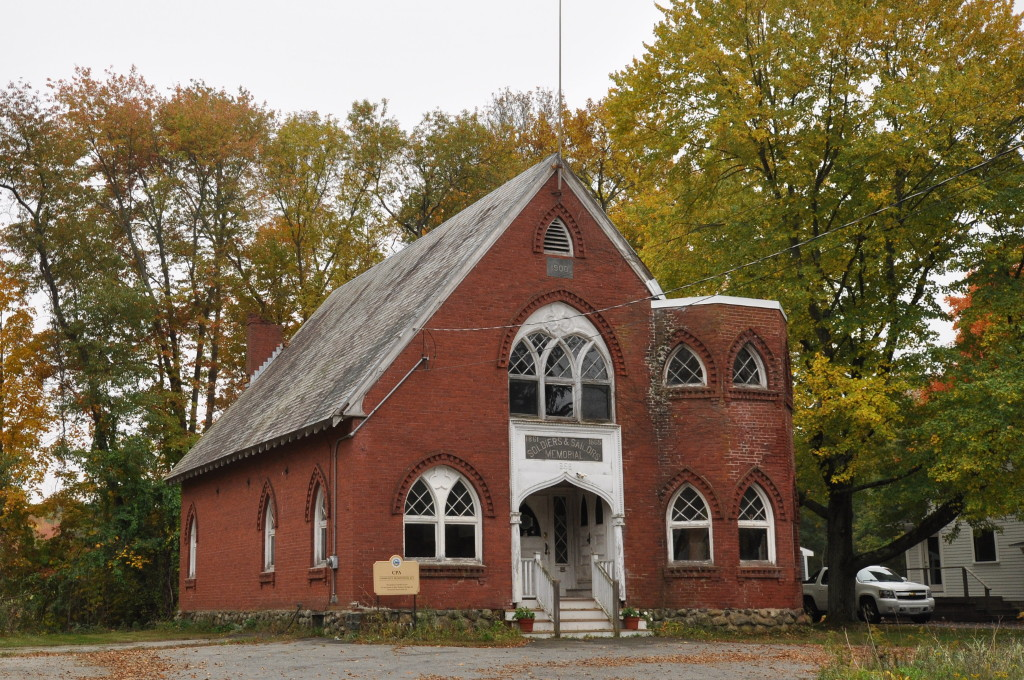

- Location within Massachusetts Location within the United States
- Location: 363 Main St., West Newbury, Massachusetts
- Coordinates: 42°47′59″N 70°59′28″W
- Built: 1900
- Architect: Henry Gore
- Architectural style: Gothic Revival architecture
- NRHP reference No.: 16000544
- Added to NRHP: August 22, 2016

The Soldiers and Sailors Memorial Building in West Newbury, Massachusetts is a historic American Civil War memorial building at 363 Main Street. Built in 1900, it is a distinctive local example of Gothic Revival architecture. It has served as a meeting place for veterans organizations (for many years as the local American Legion post) and housed the local public library for 12 years. It was listed on the National Register of Historic Places in 2016.

== Description and history ==
The Soldiers and Sailors Memorial Building is located in the central village area of West Newbury on the south side of Main Street (Massachusetts Route 113 a short way west of the town offices. It is a two-story brick building with a gabled roof and an octagonal tower at the right front corner. The tower faces has Gothic-arched windows on two levels, and is topped by a crenellated parapet. The main entrance is at the center of the front facade, deeply recessed in a tall arched opening that extends into the gable area, with a multipart Gothic window above. A two-part Gothic window is set to the left of the entrance, and there is a small Gothic window at the peak of the gable.

The hall was built in 1900 to a design by Henry W. Gore, an architect from Braintree, Massachusetts. It is one of three documented Gothic buildings in West Newbury. It was funded by a bequest from Moses Warren Edwards, a lifelong town resident who sought to establish a memorial to the town's participants in the American Civil War, and to provide a space for its public library. The hall was first occupied by the local chapter of the Grand Army of the Republic, and was turned over to the Charles L. CarrAmerican Legion post # 240 on 12 July 1923. The library was housed in the building between 1927 and 1939, in a rent-free arrangement between the post and the town. The building continues to serve as a local meeting point, mainly for local veterans organizations.

== See also ==
- National Register of Historic Places listings in Essex County, Massachusetts
