= John Tufts (music educator) =

Reverend John Tufts (26 February 1689 – 17 August 1750) was an early American music educator.

== Biography ==
He was born in Medford, Massachusetts. He graduated from Harvard in 1708, and was minister at Newbury, Massachusetts, from 1714 until 1738, where he preached sermons that disparaged music illiteracy. Retired from the ministry in 1738, moved to Amesbury, Massachusetts, and set up as a shopkeeper there until his death. He wrote the first American textbook meant to solve the problem, An Introduction to the Singing of Psalm Tunes, with a Collection of Tunes in Three Parts (Boston, 1715). He also published a sermon, “Humble Call to Archippus” (1729). He died in Amesbury.

== Music book ==
The appendix of An Introduction to the Singing of Psalm Tunes presented the rudiments of music, instructions for tuning the voice, musical notation, intervals, scales, clefs, and meter signatures. The book became the prototype for numerous other books written during the 18th century. The third edition, published in 1726, is the earliest still in existence. It contained 37 English psalm tunes with two harmony voices. In Music and Musicians in Early America, pp. 53–55, Irving Lowens suggests that "100 Psalm Tune New" was probably written by Tufts. If so, it could be the first published composition by an American-born composer.

Tufts was the first American to devise an innovation in musical notation to simplify music reading. He abandoned the traditional round notes and substituted the first letters of the four solmization syllables (fa, sol, la, mi) on the staff. Thus, every note in Tufts' notation was labeled F, S, L, or M for fa, sol, la, or mi. For Tufts, the syllable mi was located on the leading tone. For example, the C major scale would be sung to the following syllables: C, fa; D, sol, E, la; F, fa; G, sol, A, la; B, mi.

Tufts indicated duration with punctuation. For example the letter F indicated the solfege syllable fa to be sung for one beat. The letter F followed by a dot (F.) indicated that the note was to be held for two beats. The letter F followed by a colon (F:) indicated that the note was to be sung for four beats. If two letters were written closely together and had a slur mark over them (which Tufts called a bow), they were eighth notes.

The pioneering work of Tufts led to the singing school, which influenced American music and music education for over one hundred years. Tufts was the most significant figure in American music education until the 1820s, when Lowell Mason led it in a new direction.

== Legacy ==
His house, the Rev. John Tufts House, is now on the National Register of Historic Places. The section of Newbury where he lived is now incorporated as West Newbury.
