= Émile Lambinet =

French painter (1813–1877)

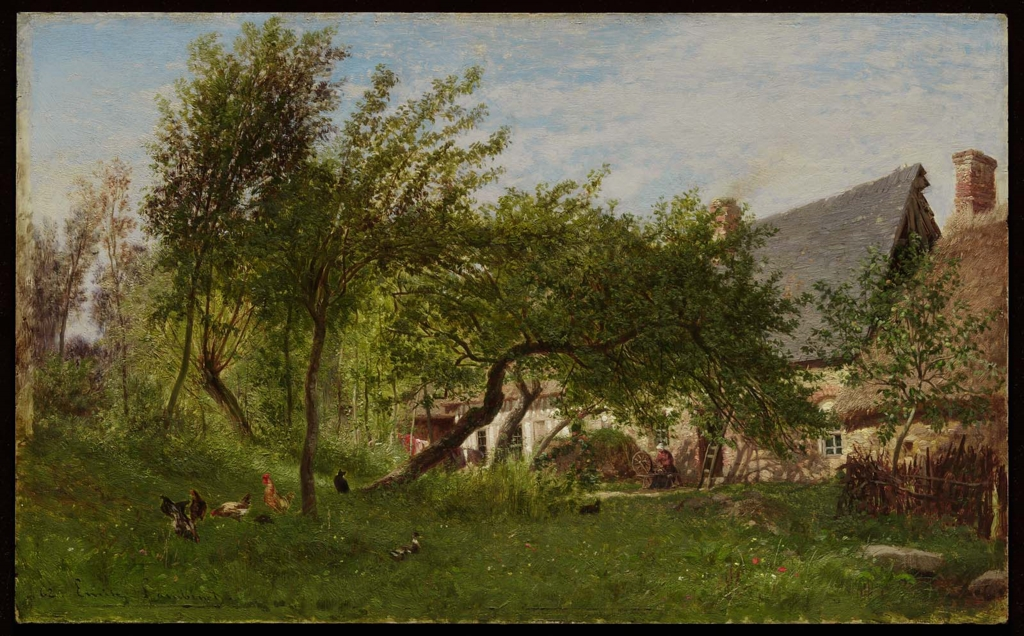
Farmyard (1868)

Émile Lambinet (1813, Versailles – 1877, Bougival) was a French painter of rural scenes. A student of Horace Vernet then Corot, he spent most of his life in Yvelines, at first in his birthplace of Versailles, then at Bougival from 1860.

== Biography ==
A student of Horace Vernet,Antoine-Félix Boisselier, and later Jean-Baptiste-Camille Corot, Émile Lambinet specialized in landscape painting.

He spent most of his life in the Yvelines department, first in Versailles, Yvelines, his hometown, and then in Bougival, where he lived from 1860 onward.

He was the cousin of Victor Lambinet (1813–1894), a magistrate, memoirist, collector, and owner of a townhouse in Versailles in the mid-19th century, which became the present-day Musée Lambinet,which houses a collection of his works.

He was awarded the Legion of Honour in 1867.

== Works at the musée Lambinet ==
His cousin, Victor Lambinet, bequeathed the hotel Lambinet to the town of Versailles – it is now the musée Lambinet. Paintings there by Émile include :

- Banks of the Seine near Bougival.
- Fishers beside a pond, 1860.
- The Château des Roches at Bièvres, 1874
- Île-de-France landscape with two foreground figures, 1872.
- Bouquet of flowers, 18(??).
- Landscape with boatmen, 1864.
- Banks of a river, summer.
- Road, 18(50).
- Bank of a river.
- View from the Pavillon du Butard near Versailles.

== Bibliography ==
- (in French) Peintures du musée Lambinet à Versailles, ed. Somogy et Musée Lambinet, 2005, s. l. (Italy), ISBN 2-85056-938-0.
