= Lee M. Friedman =

Jewish-American lawyer and politician (1871–1957)

Lee Max Friedman
- c. 1918
- Born: December 29, 1871; Memphis, Tennessee, US
- Died: August 7, 1957 (aged 85)
- Burial place: Forest Hills Cemetery
- Education: Harvard Law School
- Occupations: Lawyer, politician
- Political party: Republican

Lee Max Friedman (December 29, 1871 – August 7, 1957) was a Jewish-American lawyer and politician from Massachusetts.

== Life ==
At Harvard, c. 1893

Friedman was born on December 29, 1871, in Memphis, Tennessee, the son of shoe wholesaler Max Friedman and Tillie Marks. His father and maternal grandparents were German immigrants. His father served as an officer in the Union Army.

Friedman left Memphis with his family in 1875 during a yellow fever epidemic and settled in Boston, Massachusetts, where his father became the largest boot and shoe wholesaler in the country and a partner of the chrome leather tannery Bernard & Friedman in Danvers. Friedman lived in Boston for the rest of his life. He attended the Prince Grammar School in Back Bay and graduated with honors from the Roxbury Latin School in 1889. By that point, he lived in Roxbury. He then went to Harvard College, where he was influenced by Professor Charles Eliot Norton and his roommate and lifelong friend was minister and American Unitarian Association president Louis Cornish.

Friedman graduated magna cum laude from Harvard College with an A.B. in 1893. He then went to Harvard Law School, where he graduated with an LL.B. degree in 1895. He was admitted to the bar later that year. He worked as an associate for Ropes, Gray & Loring from 1895 to 1897. He then worked with Morse, Hill & Hodges from 1897 to 1898. He was part of the law firm Morse & Friedman from 1898 to 1912 as its junior member, with the law office at 53 State Street in Boston. By 1899, he wrote several articles for the American Law Review, the Harvard Law Review, and The Green Bag.

By 1905, Friedman was president of the Boston branch of the Alliance Israélite Universelle, treasurer of the Young Men's Hebrew Association, secretary of the Purim Association, and trustee of the Children's Institutions, City of Boston. He was an unsuccessful candidate for the Republican nomination for the U.S. House of Representatives in Massachusetts's 10th congressional district in 1906. He declined several public officers the governor and mayor offered him. By 1910, he was an organizer and director of the Massachusetts Bonding and Insurance Company and the Rockland Trust Company, a director of People's National Bank, receiver of large Boston corporations, and counsel to the Boston Republic City Committee, the American Woolen Company, and the bondholders in the Bay State gas litigation.

Friedman's law partner Godfrey Morse died in 1911. He then became associate with Percy A. Atherton and formed the law firm Friedman & Atherton. The new law firm existed from 1912 to 1914, and from 1914 to 1919 the firm was called Swift, Friedman & Atherton. The firm was again known as Friedman & Atherton from 1919 to 1923, after which he was part of the firm Friedman, Atherton, Sisson & Kozol. The latter firm specialized in corporation, equity, and probate matters. He was an organizer of the Boston Juvenile Court in 1905 and a member of the Boston Municipal Research Bureau and the Massachusetts Special Committee on discrimination. He served as a government appeal agent for the Boston local board during World War I.

Friedman was a trustee and vice-president of Portia Law School. He was elected vice-president of Temple Israel of Boston in 1931. He owned one of the largest collections of Jewish and Jewish-related books and manuscripts in the country, including the manuscript of Émile Zola's J'Accuse...! In 1905, he was in charge of the celebrations in Boston to commemorate the 250th anniversary of the settlement of Jews in America, and in 1955 he was the main speaker at Symphony Hall, Boston to commemorate the 300th anniversary. Deeply interested in Jewish American history, he became associated with the American Jewish Historical Society in 1903, served as its president from 1948 to 1953, and became its honorary president in 1953. He contributed a number of articles and notes for the Publications of the American Jewish Historical Society on a wide range of subjects and published a number of volumes on Jewish history. He presented books and manuscripts to the American Jewish Historical Society, and a bequest in his will helped the Society to establish its own headquarters adjourning Brandeis University.

An active member of the Jewish community, Friedman was a trustee of Beth Israel Hospital and the Associated Jewish Philanthropies, an executive committee member of the Union of American Hebrew Congregations, a Governing Board member of the World Union for Progressive Judaism, vice-president of the Jewish Publication Society of America, and a director of the National Jewish Welfare Board. His collection of Judaica, the Friedman Judaica, was left to the Houghton Library at the urging of Professor Harry Austryn Wolfson. He received an honorary Doctor of Hebrew Letters degree from Hebrew Union College in 1943 and an honorary Doctor of Jurisprudence degree from Suffolk University in 1952. He was also a trustee and president of the Boston Public Library, a Visiting Committee member of the Boston Art Museum Print Department and the Harvard Library, and a trustee of the General Theological Seminary. His vast art collection, collected over the course of almost sixty years, was divided between the Boston Art Museum and the Boston Public Library.

Friedman was a member of the American Bar Association, the Massachusetts Bar Association, the Boston Bar Association, the American Antiquarian Society, the Massachusetts Historical Society, and the Anglo-Jewish Historical Society in London (which he was a corresponding member of).

Friedman died on August 7, 1957. He was buried in Forest Hills Cemetery.

== Writings ==
- Wills of Early Jewish Settlers in New York (1900)
- Godfrey Morse (1914)
- Early Jewish Residents in Massachusetts (1915)
- Cotton Mather and the Jews (1918)
- The American Society for Meliorating the Condition of the Jews, and Joseph S.C.F. Frey its Missionary: A Study in American Jewish History (1925)
- Early American Jews (1934)
- Robert Grosseteste and the Jews (1934)
- Zola & the Dreyfus Case: His Defense of Liberty and Its Enduring Significance (1937)
- Pilgrims in a New Land (1948)
