= Amy Wentworth Stone =

American children's book author

- Born: Amy Wentworth; January 25, 1876; Danvers, Massachusetts
- Died: March 17, 1938 (aged 62)
- Spouse: Seymour H. Stone
- Children: Gertrude Stone, Jean Stone

Signature
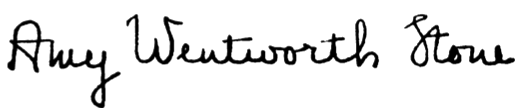

Amy Wentworth Stone (1876-1938) was an American writer known for being the author of P-Penny and His Little Red Cart as well as other books for children.

== Early life and education ==
Stone was born in Danvers, Massachusetts on January 25, 1876 to Philip Henry and Harriet Lucetta (Daniell) Wentworth. She grew up at an estate called Locust Lawn.

She received an A.B. from Vassar College in 1898 and graduated Phi Beta Kappa, writing her senior thesis on "The Problem of the Delinquent". She was class secretary for her class for the rest of her life. In 1921, the poem "Hark Alma Mater" that she had written during her schooling was officially adopted as the Vassar's school song, set to music written by George Coleman Gow, a Professor of Music.

She married Seymour Howard Stone, a social worker who became a correctional administrator, on April 25, 1901. They had two children, Gertrude and Jean, and after a brief time in Elizabeth, New Jersey, the family lived in West Roxbury, Massachusetts. The family also owned a summer home which they called "Grey Wings" which was in New Harbor, Maine.

== Career ==
Stone originally pursued social work working for the Boston Children’s Aid Society. After her marriage she briefly worked as assistant probation officer in Union County, New Jersey before the family moved to Massachusetts. Her first short stories were published in 1914 in The Atlantic and The Century Magazine. Her stories often revolved around children being impish or naughty. When asked about why this was, she replied that she "wrote a story once about a child of virtue who had golden curls blue eyes and all the parts and that nobody would have him... stories of naughty children are the kind that editors like best." Kirkus called Treasure for Debby "pleasant reading" and said that Let Polly Do It was "a better than average tale."

Stone's books were frequently selected for children's book lists. Here's Juggins was selected by the State of Michigan to be part of the Children's Fund of Michigan's Loan Collection of Books for Boys and Girls in 1936. P-Penny and His Little Red Cart was chosen by the National Council of Teachers of English to be part of their Reading for Fun recommendations in 1937. Her posthumously published book Going-on-Nine which is about her childhood at Locust Lawn was chosen as a selection of the Junior Literary Guild for eight and ten year olds in 1940. Stone's archived correspondence with the Maine State Library details how her books came to be included in the Maine Author Collection.

She died in 1938 and is buried in the Forest Hills Cemetery in Jamaica Plain, Massachusetts, with her parents and sister.

== Bibliography ==
- P-Penny and his little red cart, illustrated by Hildegard Woodward (1934)
- Here's Juggins (1936)
- Treasure for Debby (1936)
- Let Polly do it, illustrated by Margaret Ayer (1937)
- Going-on-nine, Illustrated by Eloise Wilkin (originally titled: It Was Fun to be Eight, posthumous, 1938)
