= Roger and the Fox =

1947 book by Lavinia R. Davis

- First edition.
- Author: Lavinia R. Davis
- Illustrator: Hildegard Woodward
- Publisher: Doubleday
- Publication date: 1947
- Publication place: United States
- Pages: unpaged
- Awards: Caldecott Honor

Roger and the Fox is a 1947 American children's picture book by Lavinia R. Davis and illustrated by Hildegard Woodward. The book was a recipient of a 1948 Caldecott Honor for its illustrations.

== Plot ==
All during the autumn, Roger tries in vain to find the fox, but his Christmas present finally provides the opportunity.
