= The Wild Birthday Cake =

1949 book by Lavinia R. Davis

- First edition.
- Author: Lavinia R. Davis
- Illustrator: Hildegard Woodward
- Publisher: Doubleday
- Publication date: 1949
- Publication place: United States
- Pages: unpaged
- Awards: Caldecott Honor

The Wild Birthday Cake is a 1949 American children's picture book written by Lavinia R. Davis and illustrated by Hildegard Woodward. The book describes what happens when a boy wonders what to take to a friend's party. The book was a recipient of a 1950 Caldecott Honor Book for its illustrations.
