= Firemen's Memorial =

Firemen's Memorial may refer to:

- Firemen's Memorial (Boston), 1909
- Firemen's Memorial (Manhattan), 1913
