= Herbert L. Jackson =

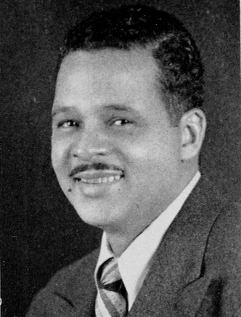

Member of the Massachusetts House of Representatives from the 21st Middlesex district
- In office 1951–1955
- Preceded by: George O'Farrell
- Succeeded by: George O'Farrell

Personal details
- Born: Herbert Loring Jackson; October 20, 1908 Malden, Massachusetts, United States
- Died: September 5, 1978 (aged 69) Oak Bluffs, Massachusetts, United States
- Party: Republican
- Spouse: Doris Pope
- Children: 3

Herbert Loring Jackson (October 20, 1908 – September 5, 1978) was an American politician who was the first black city councilor in Malden, Massachusetts and a member of the Massachusetts House of Representatives.

== Early life ==
Jackson was born on October 20, 1908, in Malden. He was the youngest of 13 children born to a former slave. He graduated from Malden High School in 1927 and was class president. He attended Suffolk University Law School and the Massachusetts College of Art and Design and was a professional actor for a short time. After his father's death, Jackson took over his dry cleaning and tailoring shop.

== Politics ==
In 1945, Jackson became the first African American to run for the Malden city council. He was elected to represent Ward 5, which was 99% white. In 1949 he was joined on the council by Overton Crawford, making Malden the first Massachusetts city to have two black city council members. In 1950, Jackson was elected council president, becoming the second African American in Massachusetts to hold this position (Springfield Commons Council president James Higgins was the first). He served as council president again in 1965, 1971, and 1975. Jackson remained on the city council until his retirement in 1975.

From 1951 to 1955, Jackson represented the 21st Middlesex district in the Massachusetts House of Representatives. From 1963 to 1975, Jackson was an officer in the Middlesex Superior Court in Cambridge, Massachusetts.

In 1976, the city council chamber in the new Malden government center was named after Jackson. In 2021 the council chamber in the new Malden City Hall was named after Jackson.

== Personal life ==
Jackson was married to Doris Pope, granddaughter of James W. Pope, the second black member of the Boston Common Council. Her brother, Lincoln Pope Jr., was also a member of the state legislature. Jackson died on September 5, 1978, at his summer home in Oak Bluffs, Massachusetts. He was survived by his wife and three children.
