= Martin Milmore =

American sculptor

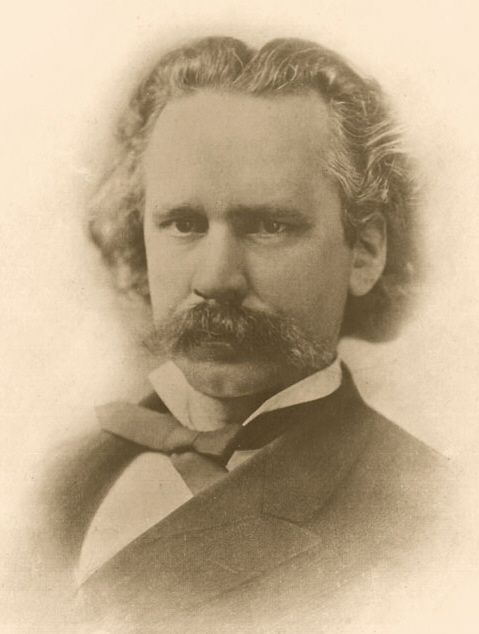
- Born: September 14, 1844; Sligo, Ireland
- Died: July 21, 1883 (aged 38); Boston, Massachusetts
- Education: Boston Latin School; Lowell Institute
- Known for: Sculpture
- Notable work: Soldiers and Sailors Monument; Statue of John Glover
- Movement: Thomas Ball
- Memorials: Death and the Sculptor

Martin Milmore (1844–1883) was an American sculptor.

== Life and career ==
Martin Milmore was born in Sligo, Ireland on September 14, 1844. He immigrated to Boston at age seven, graduated from Boston Latin School in 1860, took art lessons at the Lowell Institute, and learned to carve in wood and stone from his older brother Joseph (1841–1886).

He entered the studio of Thomas Ball of Charlestown in his early teens and stayed until the mid-1860s. His first sculptures seem to have been cabinet-size busts of Henry Wadsworth Longfellow (New Hampshire Historical Society, Concord) and Charles Sumner, both modeled from life around 1863. In the 1860s he worked from the Studio Building.

By his 20th birthday, Milmore received a commission for three giant figures ("Ceres", "Flora" and "Pomona") for the front of the Horticultural Hall in Boston; the restored versions are now on display at the Elm Bank Horticulture Center.

He subsequently designed the Roxbury Soldiers' Monument at Forest Hills Cemetery in Jamaica Plain, Massachusetts (1867), the American Sphinx in Mount Auburn Cemetery (1872), the Statue of John Glover on Commonwealth Avenue (1875), the Soldiers and Sailors Monument for the Boston Common (1877), and a bust of Senator Charles Sumner, now displayed in the United States Senate.

Milmore died in Boston on July 21, 1883. Daniel Chester French created a memorial tribute entitled Death and the Sculptor for the grave of Milmore and his brother in Forest Hills Cemetery.

Milmore's work is widely available to see in public parks, historic cemeteries, town squares, museums and libraries throughout New England and in Pennsylvania.

== Gallery ==
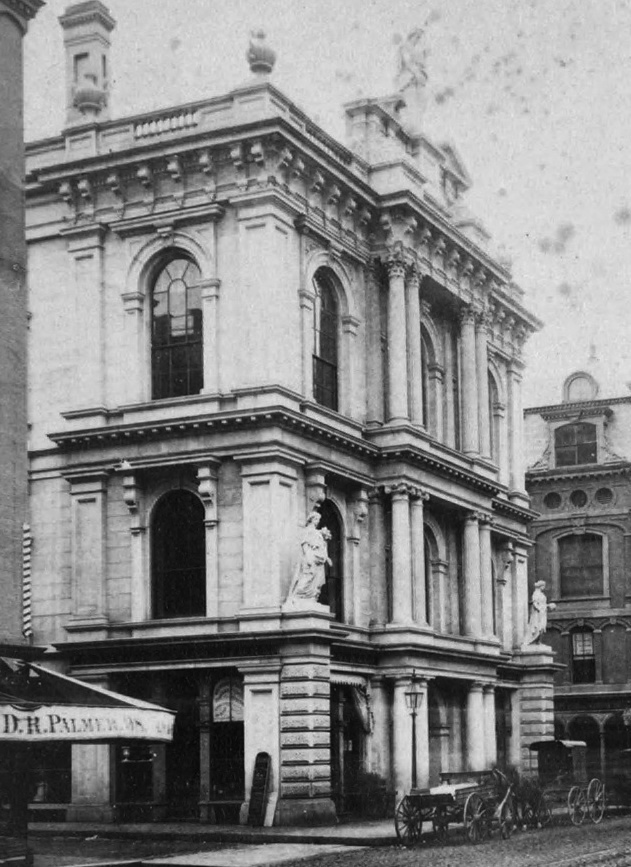
Horticultural Hall,
Tremont Street, Boston;
sculptural figures by Millmore (1864)

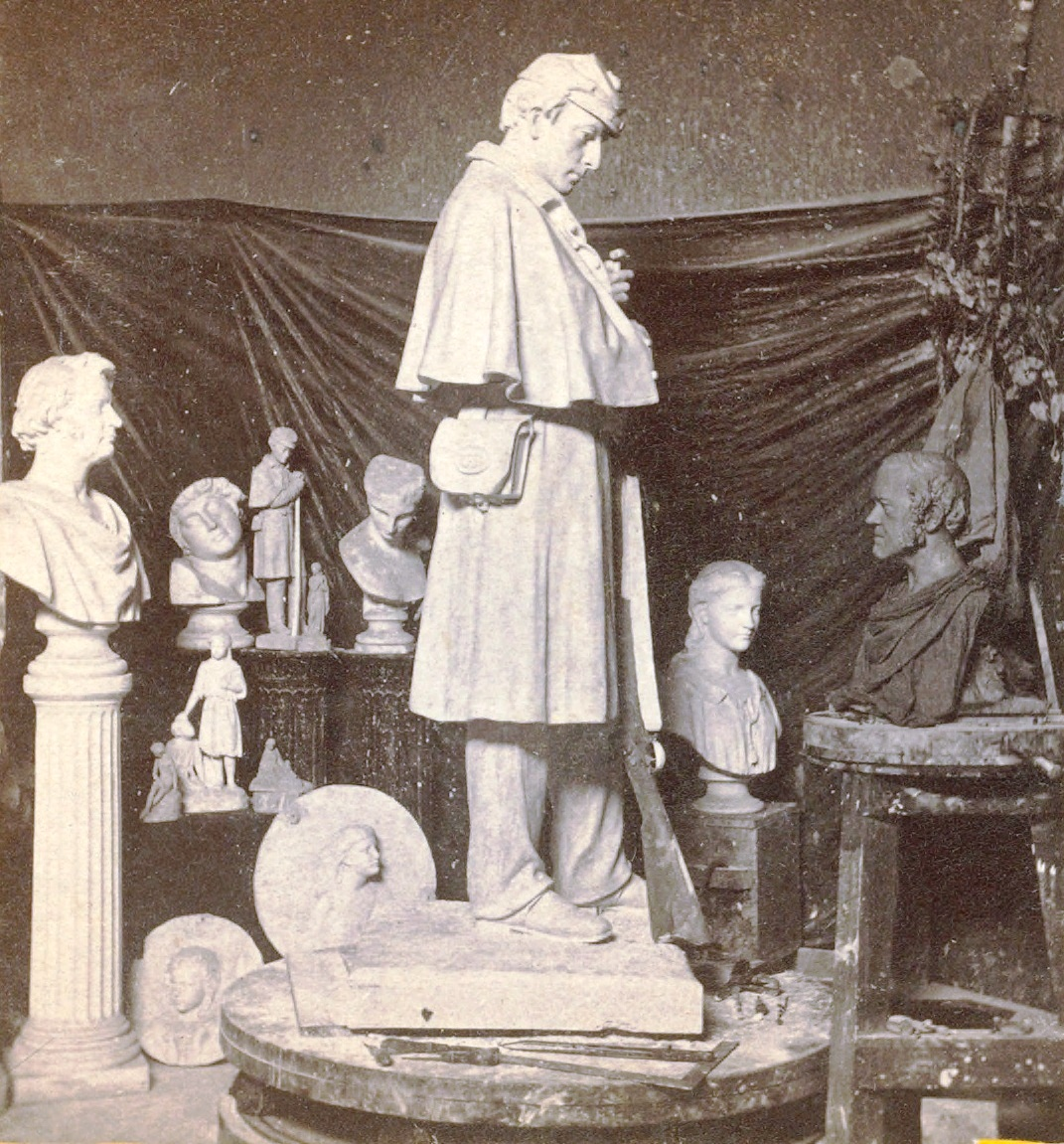
Milmore's studio, c.1867

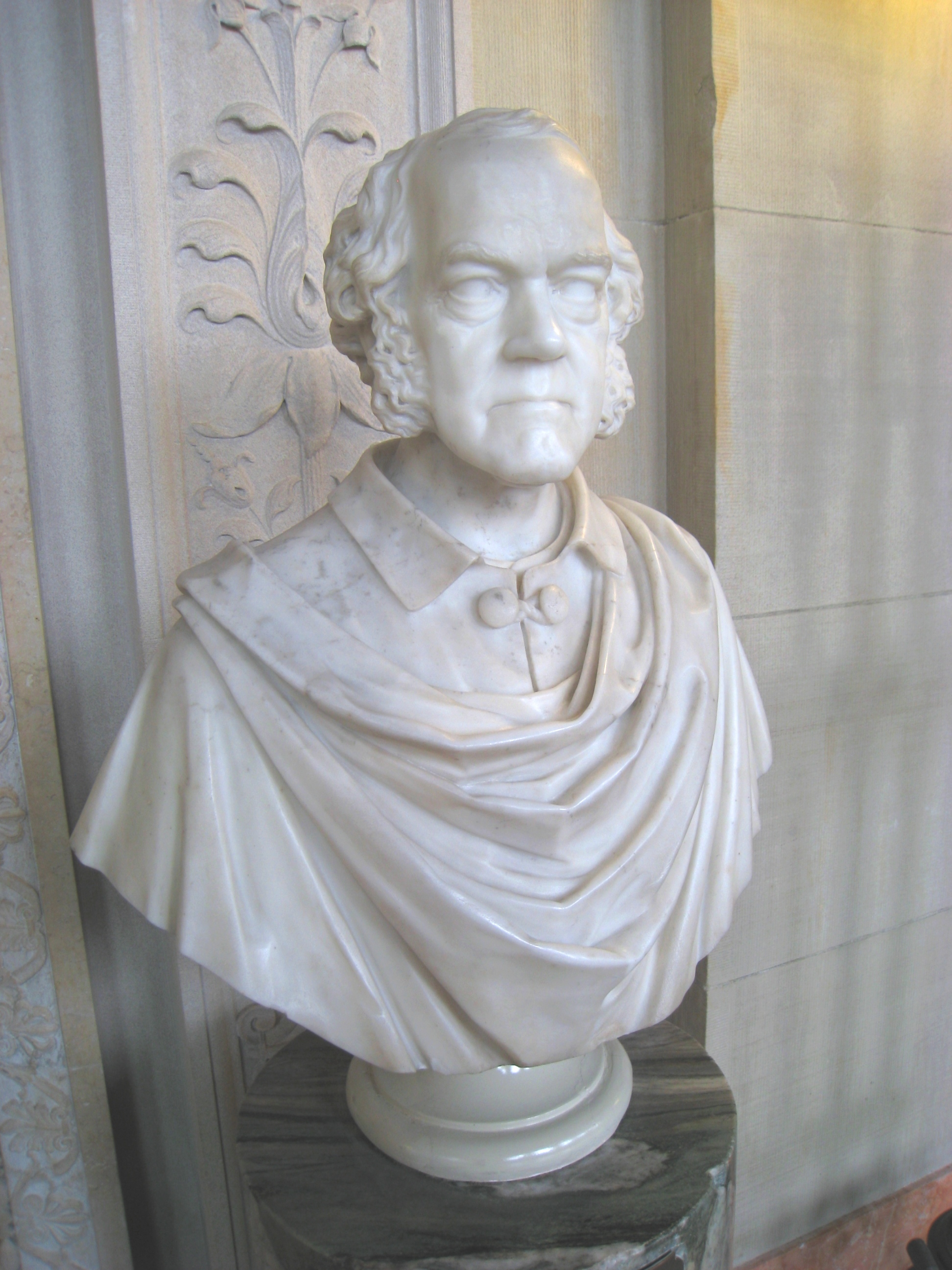
Bust of George Ticknor (1871),
McKim Building
Boston Public Library

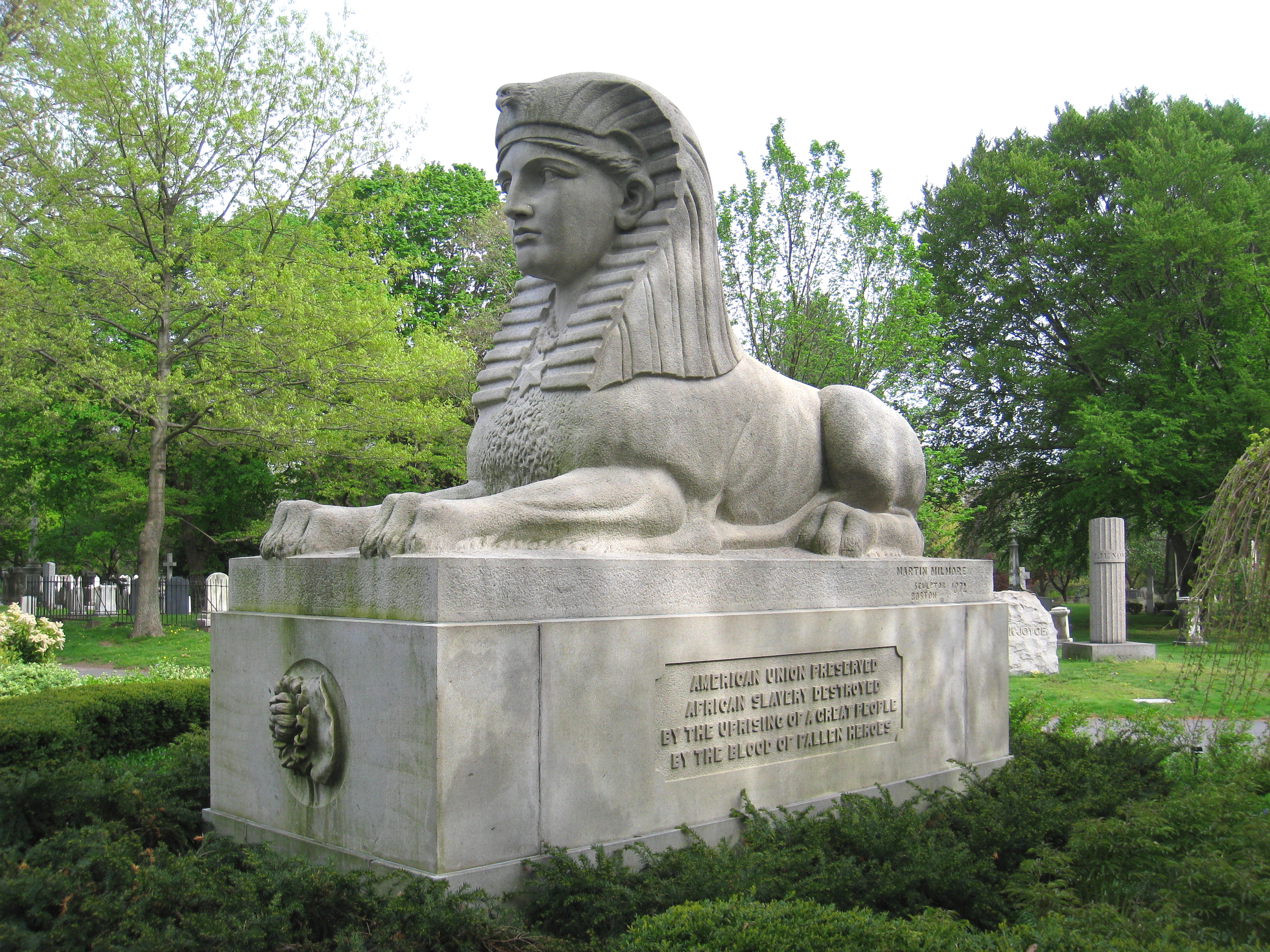
American Sphinx (1872)
Mount Auburn Cemetery,
Cambridge, Massachusetts

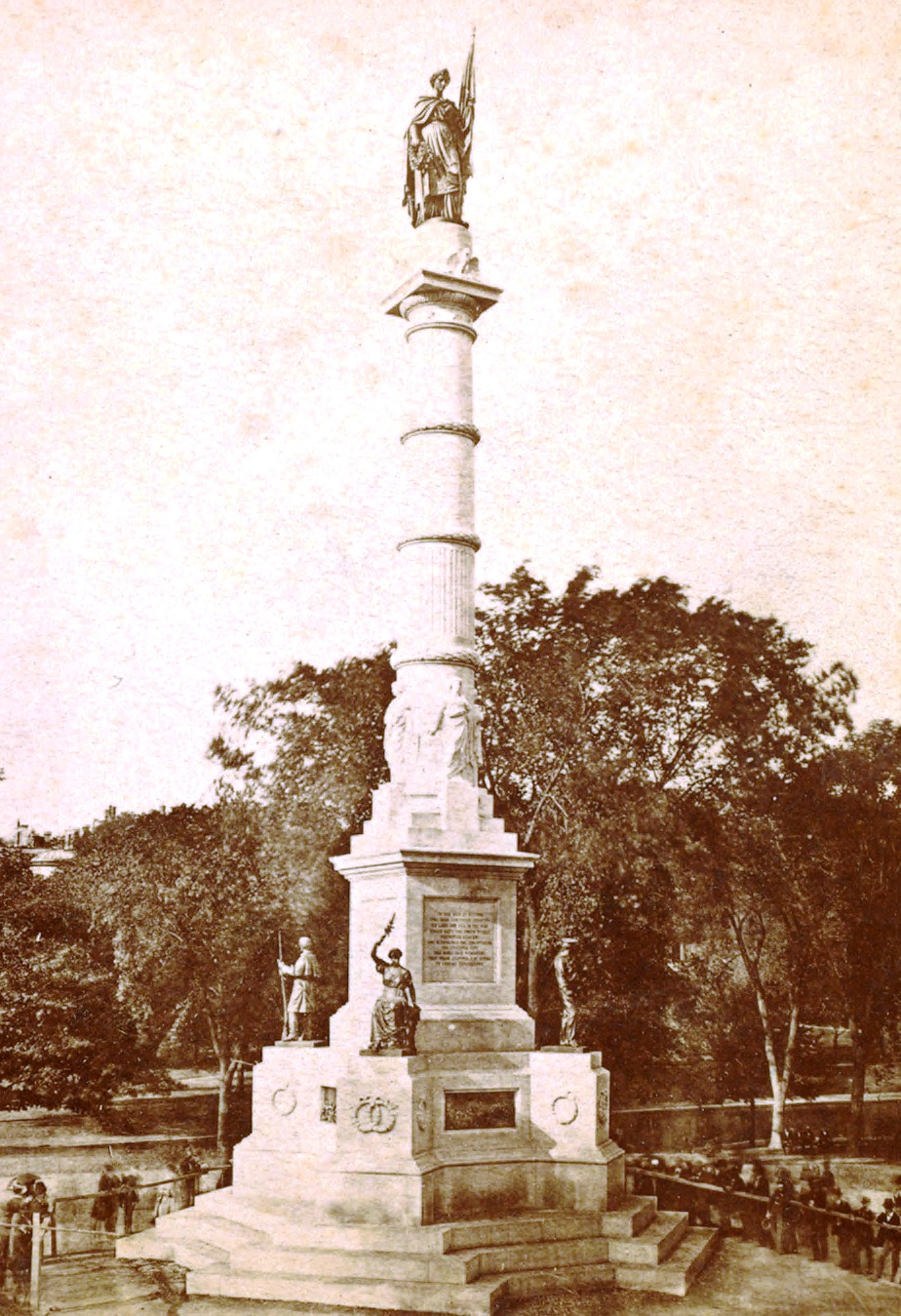
Soldiers and Sailors Monument (1877),
Boston Common

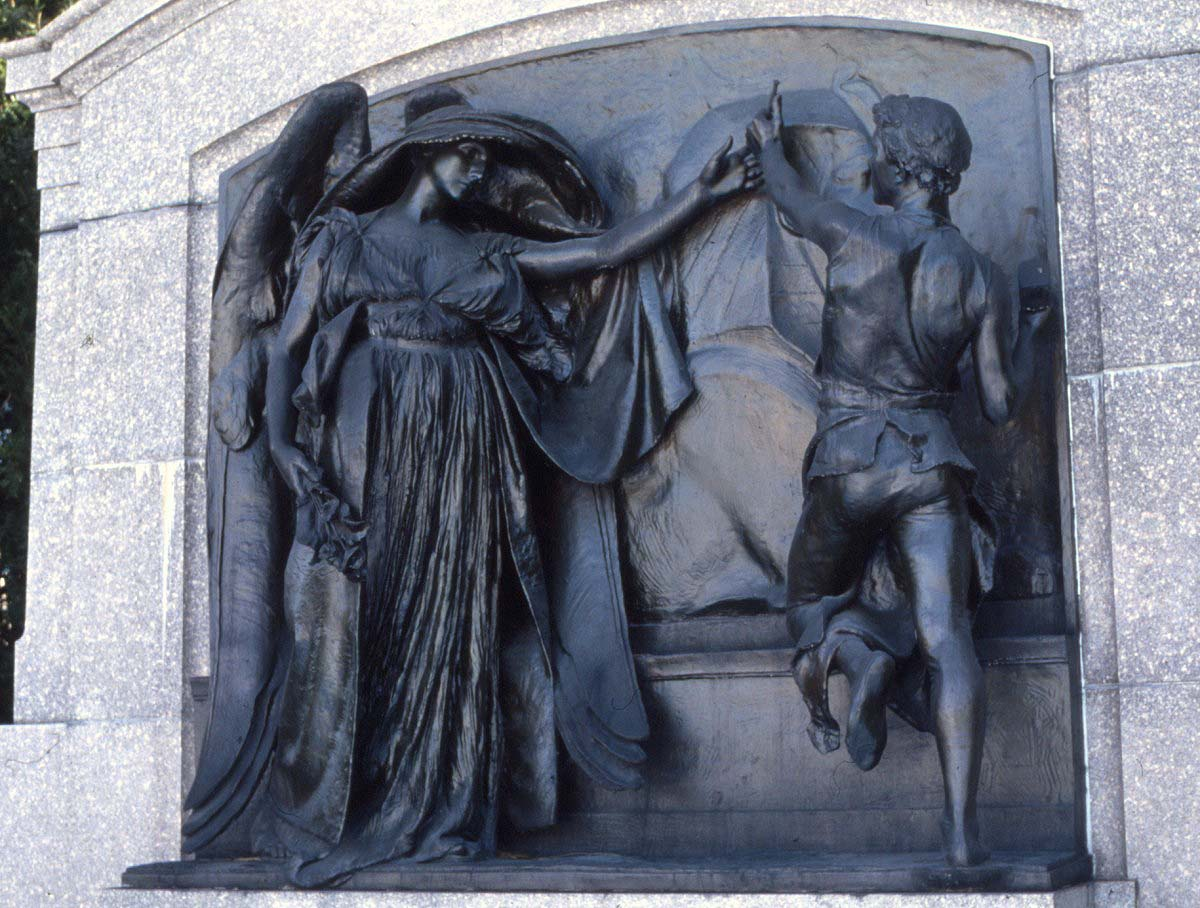
Death and the Sculptor (1893),
memorial to Milmore
by Daniel Chester French

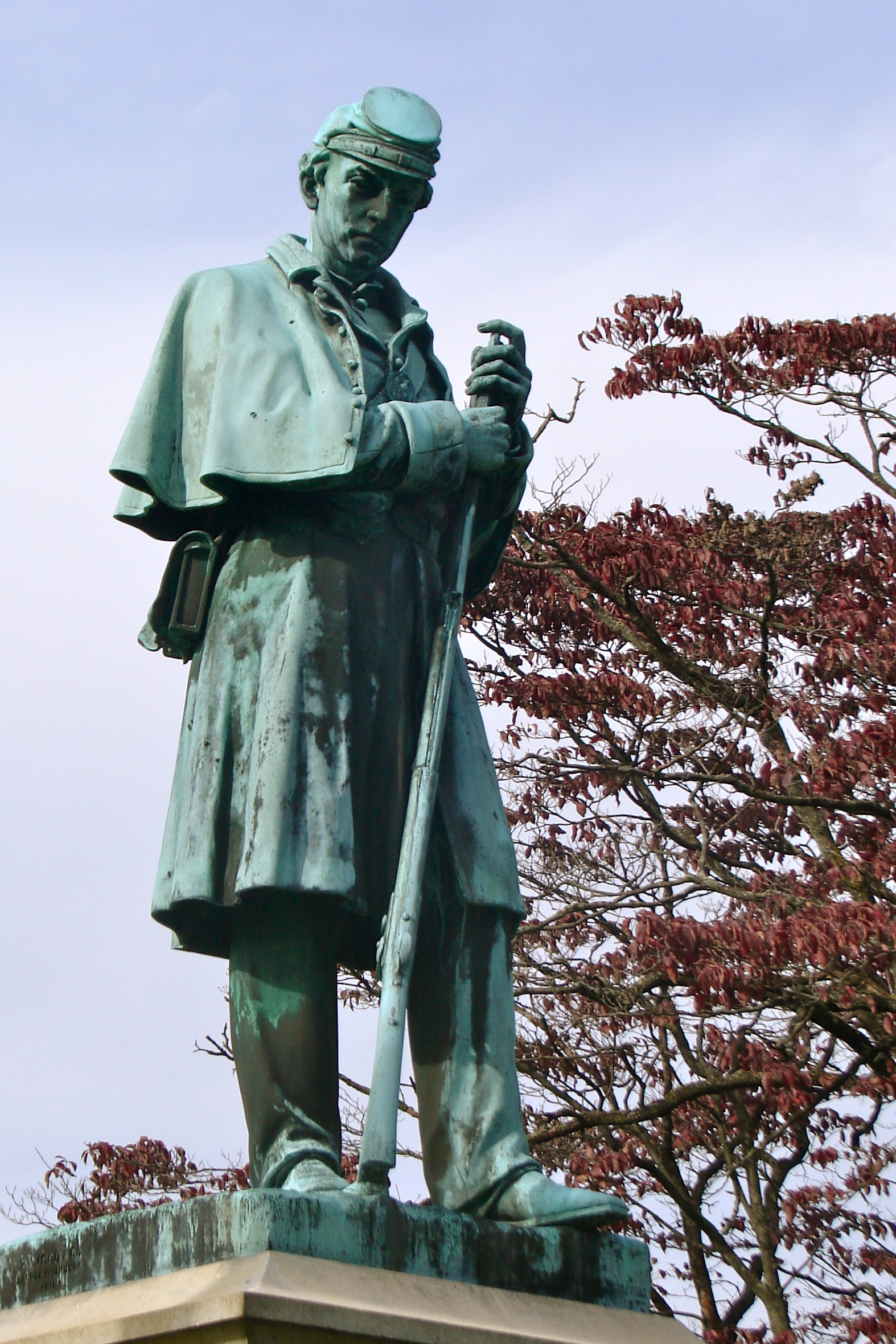
Civil War Memorial (1873)
Chester Rural Cemetery
Chester, Pennsylvania

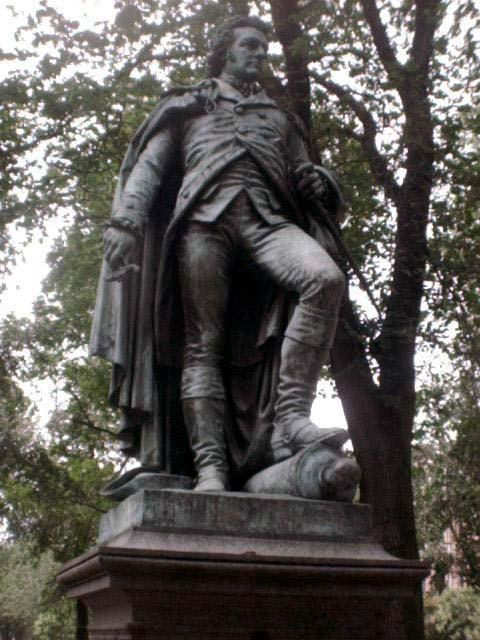
General John Glover (1875) on Commonwealth Avenue, Boston
