= Death and the Sculptor =

Sculpture by Daniel Chester French in Boston, Massachusetts

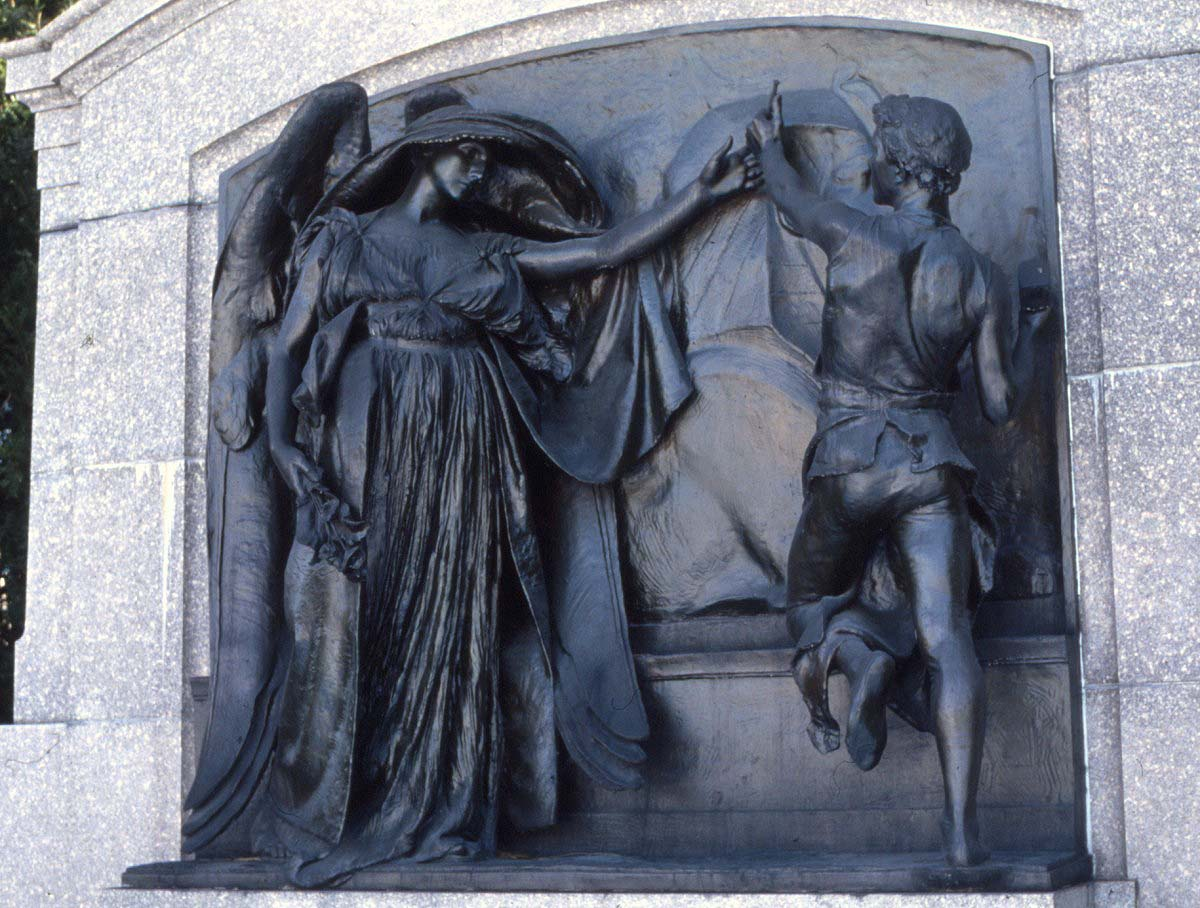
- Artist: Daniel Chester French
- Year: 1889
- Type: bronze sculpture
- Dimensions: 250 cm × 76 cm (100 in × 30 in)
- Location: Boston; 42°17′52.3″N 71°6′27.2″W
- Owner: Forest Hills Cemetery

Death and the Sculptor, also known as the Milmore Monument and The Angel of Death and the Young Sculptor is a sculpture in bronze, and one of the most important and influential works of art created by sculptor Daniel Chester French. The work was commissioned to mark the grave in Forest Hills Cemetery in Jamaica Plain, Boston, Massachusetts, of the brothers Joseph (1841–1886), James and Martin Milmore (1844–1883). It has two figures effectively in the round, linked to a background relief behind them. The right-hand figure represents a sculptor, whose hand holding a chisel is gently restrained by the fingers of the left-hand figure, representing Death, here shown as a winged female.

== Subjects ==
The Milmore brothers immigrated to the United States from Ireland in 1851, Joseph becoming a stone carver and Martin a sculptor. They frequently collaborated on commissions, the most notable one being the granite Sphinx (1873) that resides in Mount Auburn Cemetery.

== Work ==
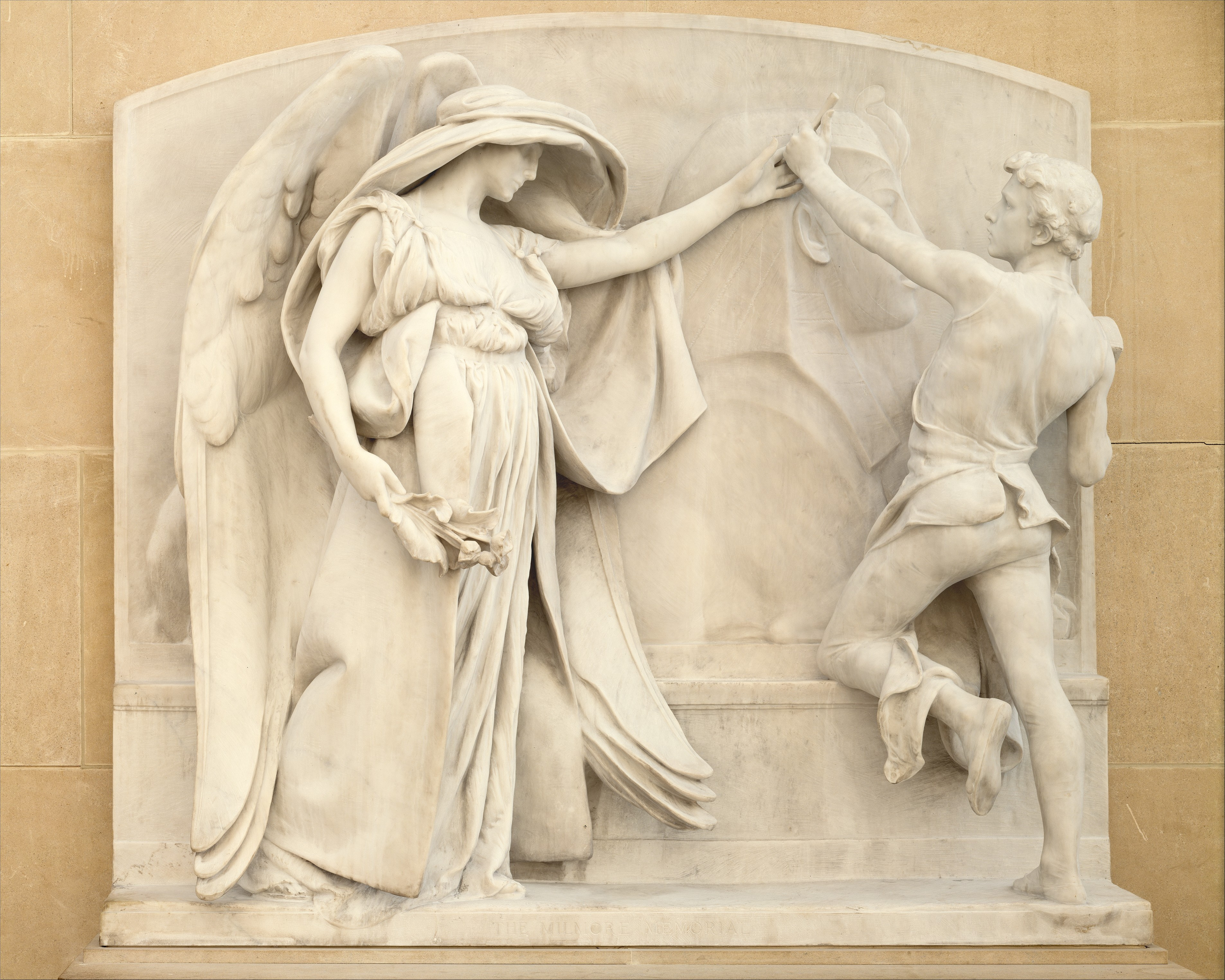
Marble version in the Metropolitan Museum of Art

French's memorial, commissioned in 1889 and dedicated in 1893, depicts the Angel of Death gently taking the hand of a sculptor, or stone carver who is working on a sphinx figure very much like the one the brothers created.

When the plaster cast of the work was in Paris to be cast into bronze it was exhibited at several salons, including the Salon de Champs de Mars where it was awarded a third-class medal, "only the second time an American had been so honored by the Parisian art world."

The architectural setting was initially designed by architect C. Howard Walker, but this was redesigned by French's frequent collaborator Henry Bacon in 1914, and finally replaced in 1945 by one designed the Boston firm of Andrews, Jones Boscoe and Whitmore, at which time the location of the monument was changed. The bronze portion was cast in Paris by the Gruet Foundry. French and the Milmore family agreed to have four other casts of the piece done, which went to museums in Chicago, Philadelphia, Boston and St. Louis.

The Chicago plaster was displayed at the World's Columbian Exposition, where it received good reviews. That cast was destroyed in 1949.

In 1917, another version of the work was done, this time in marble for the Metropolitan Museum of Art in New York. It was carved by the Piccirilli Brothers, who carved virtually all of French's marbles.

At the foot of the memorial is a bronze tablet with a epitaph by Milmore's sister:

Come, stay your hand, Death to the sculptor cried,

Those who are sleeping, have not really died.

I am the answer to the stone your fingers

have carved, the baffling riddle that still lingers

Sphinx unto curious men. So do not fear

this gentle touch. I hold dark poppies here

whose languid leaves of lethargy will bring

deep sleep to you and an incredible spring!

Come with your soul, from earth’s still blinded hour.

Mount by my hand the high, the timeless tower!

Through me the night and morning are made one,

your questions answered, your long vigil done.

Who am I? On far paths no foot has trod,

some call me Death, but others call me God.”

== See also ==
- Public sculptures by Daniel Chester French
