= Lavinia R. Davis =

American writer

Lavinia Riker Davis (1909–1961) was an American author of picture books, teenage novels, and mysteries for children and adults. She wrote over forty books, mostly under her own name, but sometimes using the pseudonym "Wendell Farmer".

She also wrote short stories, some published in The American Girl, The American Boy, St Nicholas and The Magazine of Fantasy & Science Fiction.

One of her illustrators, Hildegard Woodward, was twice awarded the Caldecott Honor for her illustrations to books written by Lavinia R. Davis, Roger and the Fox in 1948, and The Wild Birthday Cake in 1950.

== Selected bibliography ==
- Hobby Horse Hill (1939) (illus. Paul Brown)
- Buttonwood Island (1940) (illus. Paul Brown)
- We All Go Away (1940) (illus. Dorothea Warren)
- We All Go To School (1941) (illus. Dorothea Warren)
- Plow Penny Mystery (1942) (illus. Paul Brown)
- Stand Fast and Reply (1943)
- A Sea Between (1945)
- Roger and the Fox (1947) (illus. Hildegard Woodward)
- The Wild Birthday Cake (1949) (illus. Hildegard Woodward)
- Danny's Luck (1953) (illus. Hildegard Woodward)
- Donkey Detectives (1955) (illus. Jean MacDonald Porter)
- Island City: Adventures in Old New York (1961) (Peter Spier)
- The Journals of Lavinia Riker Davis (1964)

Crime Club

- Evidence Unseen (1945)
- Barren Heritage (1946)
- Threat of Dragons (1948)

As "Wendell Farmer"

- The Surprise Mystery (1943) (illus. Alice Harvey)
- Bicycle Commandos (1944) (alt. title Bicycle Detectives) (illus. Alice Harvey)
- Fish Hook Island Mystery (1945) (illus. Ninon Macknight)
