= Lincoln Pope Jr. =

American politician (1916–1979)

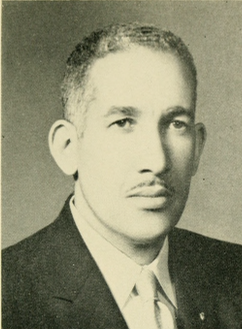

Member of the Massachusetts House of Representatives from the 9th Suffolk district
- In office 1957–1964
- Preceded by: Dennis P. Glynn
- Succeeded by: Franklin W. Holgate / Michael E. Haynes

Personal details
- Born: Lincoln G. Pope Jr. May 29, 1916 Everett, Massachusetts, United States
- Died: January 10, 1979 (aged 62) Boston, Massachusetts, United States
- Party: Democratic
- Children: 3
- Education: Lincoln University; Boston University

Lincoln G. Pope Jr. (May 29, 1916 – January 10, 1979) was an American politician who served in the Massachusetts House of Representatives from 1957 to 1965. He was the first black Democratic legislator in the Massachusetts House of Representatives.

== Early life ==
Pope was born on May 29, 1916, in Everett, Massachusetts. His grandfather, James W. Pope, was a member of the Boston Common Council in the 1880s. Pope graduated from Everett High School, Lincoln University, and Boston University. He served in the United States Army during World War II and worked as a civil engineer in the Massachusetts Department of Public Works prior to his election to the House.

== Politics ==
During the 1950s, Pope led voter registration drives in Boston's black community. He was elected to the Massachusetts House of Representatives in 1956 and represented the 9th Suffolk district until he was defeated for reelection in 1964. From 1964 to 1979 he was the legislative assistant to the Sergeant-at-Arms of the Massachusetts General Court.

== Pioneer Club ==
Pope was the owner of the Pioneer Club, a Roxbury afterhours club that attracted noted entertainers such as The Mills Brothers, Billie Holiday, Erroll Garner, Count Basie, Illinois Jacquet, Johnny "Hammond" Smith, and Gloria Lynne.

== Personal life ==
Pope was a tennis enthusiast who played in an annual tournament in Martha's Vineyard, where he had a summer residence. He was instrumental in establishing tennis courts at Sergeant William E. Carter Playground in Boston's South End, which were named after Pope.

Pope's brother-in-law, Herbert L. Jackson, was also a member of the state legislature.

Pope died on January 10, 1979, at his home in Roxbury from cancer. He was survived by his wife and three sons. He was buried in Oak Grove Cemetery in Martha's Vineyard.
