= Forest Hills Cemetery =

Historic cemetery in Massachusetts, United States

Coordinates: 42.295°N 71.106°W

- U.S. National Register of Historic Places
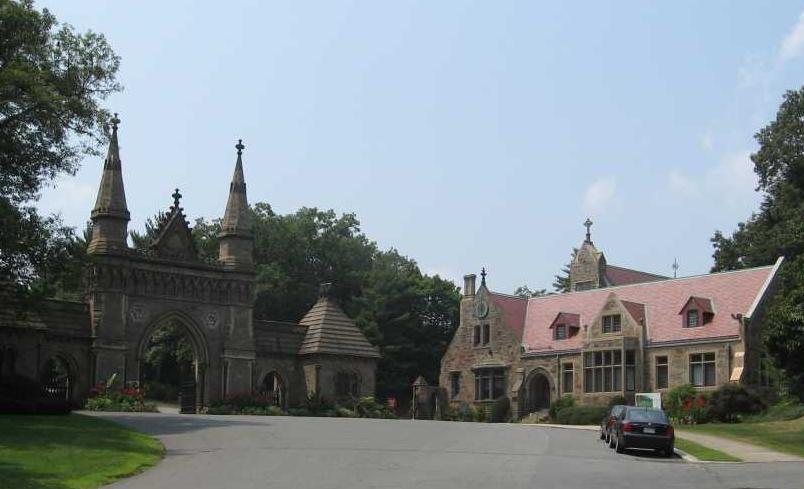
- Forest Hills Cemetery entrance in August 2007
- Location: 95 Forest Hills Ave. Boston, Massachusetts, U.S.
- Area: 250 acres (100 ha)
- Built: 1848
- Architects: Billings, Hammatt; et al.
- Architectural style: Colonial and Gothic Revival
- NRHP reference No.: 04001219
- Added to NRHP: November 17, 2004

Forest Hills Cemetery is a historic 275-acre (111.3 ha) rural cemetery, greenspace, arboretum, and sculpture garden in the Forest Hills section of Jamaica Plain, a neighborhood in Boston, Massachusetts, United States. The cemetery was established in 1848 as a public municipal cemetery for Roxbury, Massachusetts, but was privatized when Roxbury was annexed to Boston in 1868.

== Overview ==
Forest Hills Cemetery is located in the southern part of Boston's Jamaica Plain neighborhood. It is roughly bounded on the southwest by Walk Hill Street, the southeast, by the American Legion Highway, and the northeast by the Arborway and Morton Street, where its entrance is located. To the northwest, it is separated from Hyde Park Avenue by a small residential area. It abuts Franklin Park, which lies to the northeast, and is a short distance from the Arnold Arboretum to the northwest and forms a greenspace that augments the city's Emerald Necklace of parkland.

The cemetery has a number of notable monuments, including some created by notable sculptors, including Daniel Chester French, whose Death Staying the Hand of the Sculptor is in the cemetery, and John Wilson, whose Firemen's Memorial is there.

Forest Hills Cemetery is an active cemetery where interments take place on most days of the year.

== History ==
On March 28, 1848, Roxbury City Council, the municipal board in charge of the area at that time, gave an order for the purchase of the farms of the Seaverns family to establish a rural municipal park cemetery. Inspired by Mount Auburn Cemetery, Forest Hills Cemetery was designed by Henry A. S. Dearborn to provide a park-like setting to bury and remember family and friends. In the year the cemetery was established, another 14 1/2 acres (5.9 ha) were purchased from John Parkinson. This made for a little more than 71 acres (29 ha) at a cost of $27,894. The area was later increased to 225 acres (91.1 ha).

After operating as the municipal cemetery for Roxbury, Massachusetts for seven years, it was privatized in 1868 as Roxbury was annexed by neighboring Boston. In 1893, the first crematorium in Massachusetts was added to the cemetery, along with other features like a scattering garden, an indoor columbarium and an outdoor columbarium. In 1927, anarchists Nicola Sacco and Bartolomeo Vanzetti were cremated here after their execution; their ashes were later returned to Italy.

== Notable people interred at Forest Hills ==
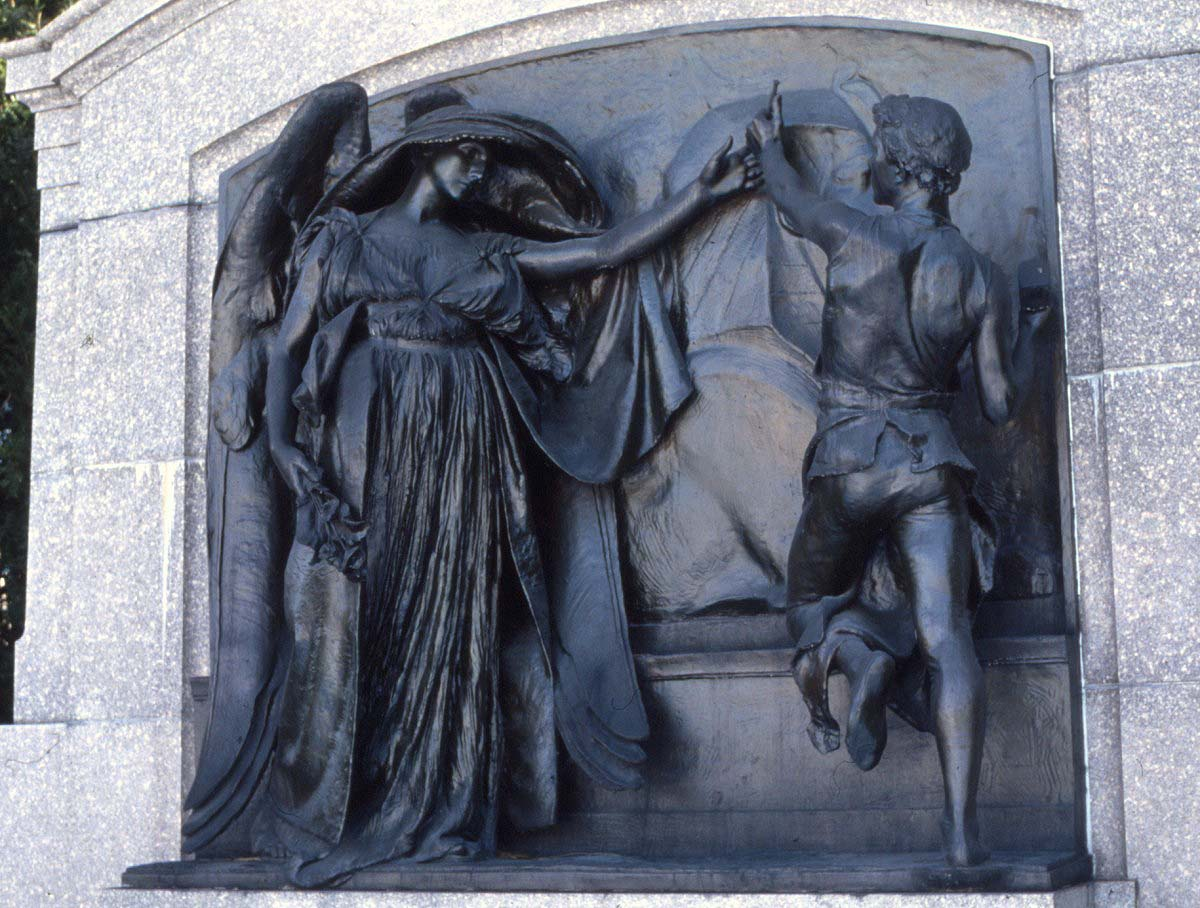
Death Staying the Hand of the Sculptor, a monument to Martin Milmore, built by Daniel Chester French between 1889 and 1893

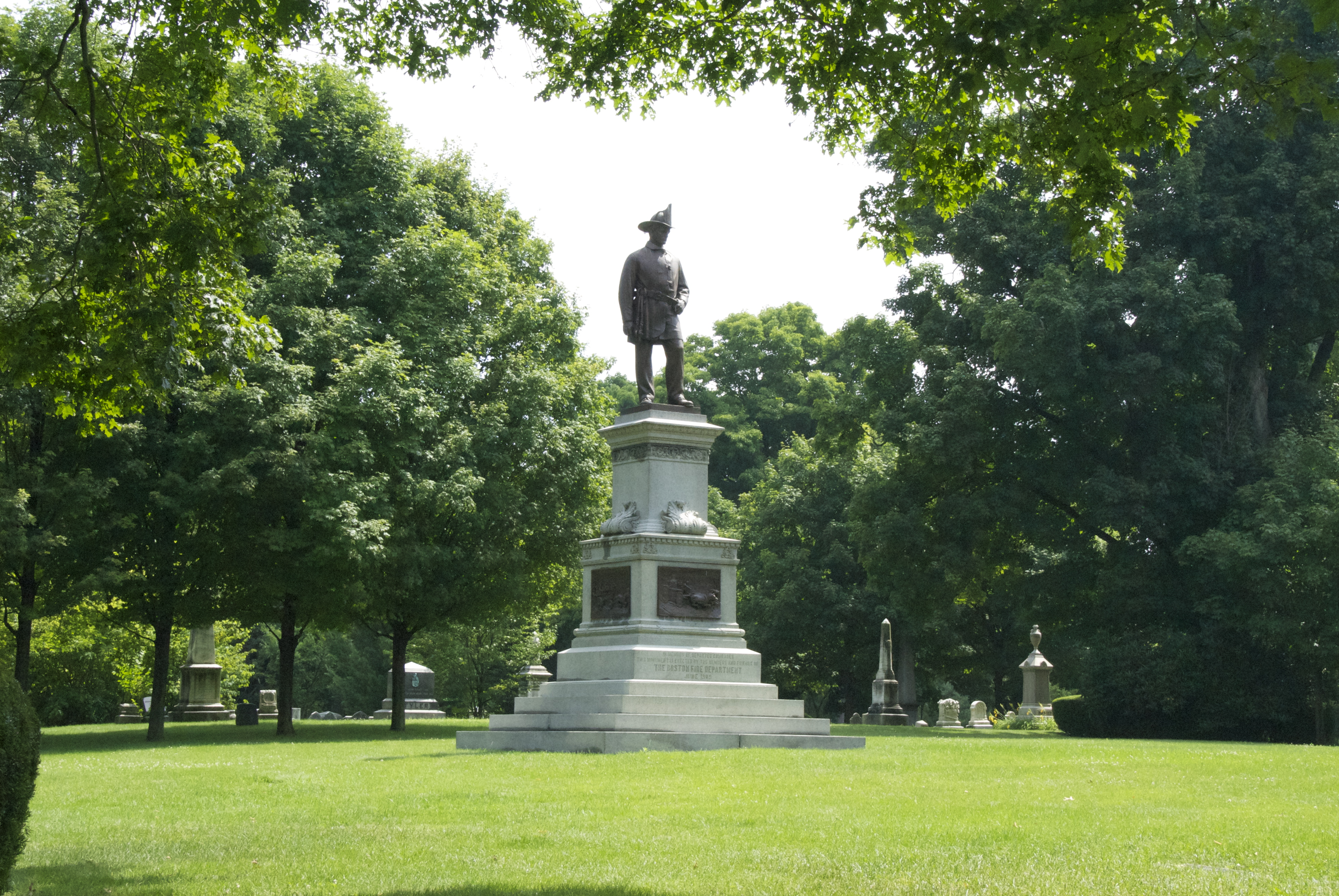
Firemen's Memorial

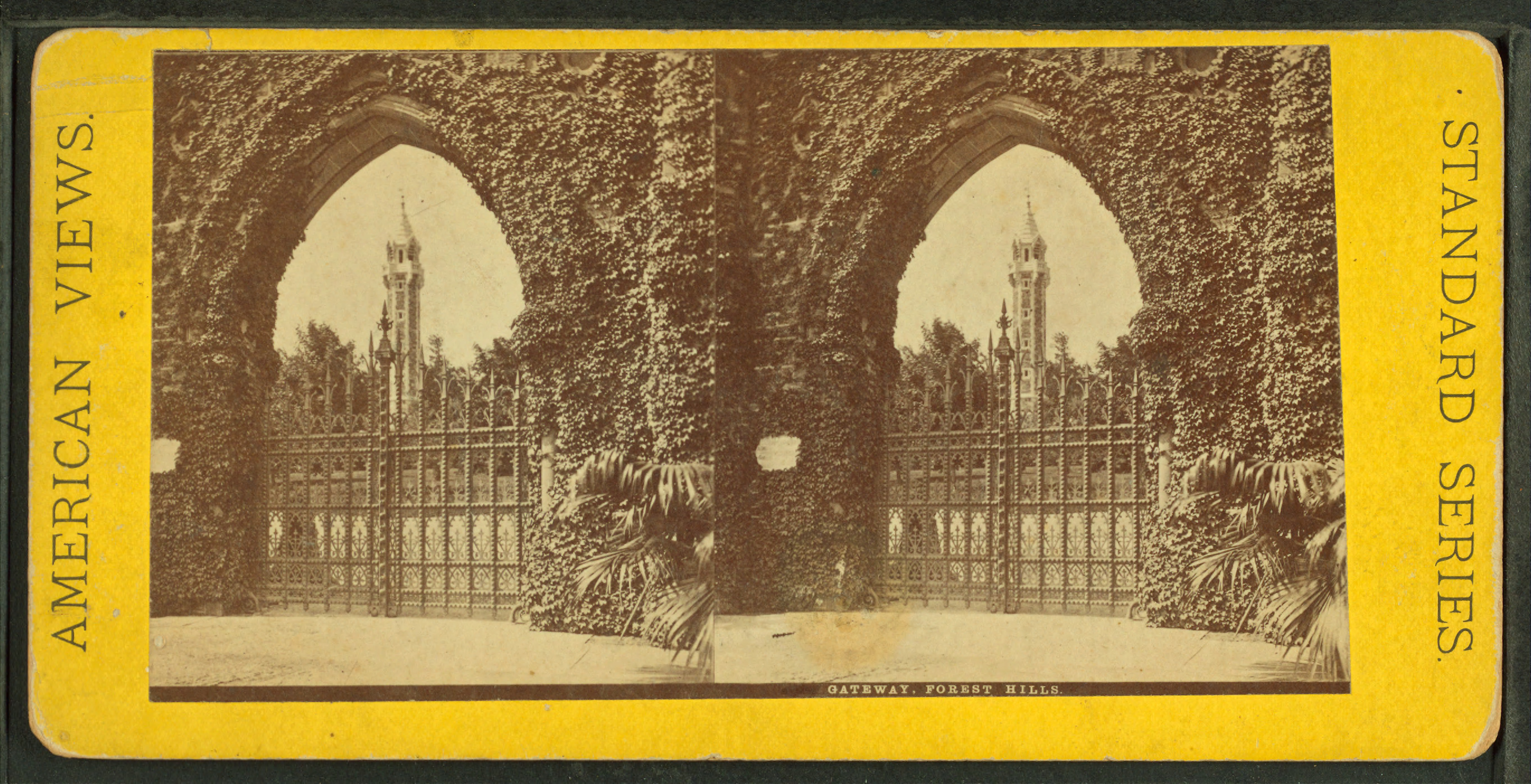
Gateway and Bell Tower

- Rufus Anderson, missionary and author
- Harrison Henry Atwood, U.S. Congressman (1895–1897) and Boston architect
- Hugh Bancroft, president of The Wall Street Journal
- Clarence W. Barron, president of Dow Jones & Company
- Cyrus Augustus Bartol, American preacher and writer
- Amy Beach, composer and pianist
- Andrew Carney, entrepreneur and philanthropist
- Serge Chaloff, swing and bebop saxophonist
- James Freeman Clarke, author
- Channing H. Cox, Governor of Massachusetts from 1921 to 1925
- E. E. Cummings, poet and artist
- Fanny Davenport, actress
- William Dawes, American Revolutionary War minuteman
- William Dwight, Union Army general in the American Civil War
- Eugene N. Foss, Governor of Massachusetts from 1911 to 1914
- Lee M. Friedman, lawyer and historian
- William Lloyd Garrison, abolitionist
- William Gaston, Governor of Massachusetts from 1875 to 1876
- Kahlil Gibran, sculptor
- Adoniram Judson Gordon (1836–1895), preacher, writer, composer, and founder of Gordon College
- Curtis Guild, Governor of Massachusetts from 1906 to 1909
- Edward Everett Hale, author
- William Heath, Continental Army general in the American Revolutionary War
- Karl Heinzen, author
- Edgar J. Helms, founder of Goodwill Industries
- Sarah Howe, fraudster of the 1870s and 1880s, notably via Ladies' Deposit Company of Boston
- Charles Hiller Innes, Massachusetts politician
- Jennie Kimball, 19th-century actor, soubrette, and theatrical manager
- Faik Konitza, Albanian intellectual, writer, journalist, and politician
- Samuel P. Langley, aviation pioneer and the namesake of NASA's Langley Research Center
- Reggie Lewis, professional basketball player for the Boston Celtics
- Francis Cabot Lowell, businessman for whom Lowell, Massachusetts, is named
- John Lowell, 18th century U.S. federal judge
- John Lowell, 19th century U.S. federal judge
- Martin Milmore, sculptor
- Carlotta Monterey, actor and wife of Eugene O'Neill
- Godfrey Morse, attorney
- Albert W. Nickerson, railroad executive
- Theofan S. Noli, prime minister of Albania and bishop
- Eugene O'Neill, playwright
- Joseph C. Pelletier, Suffolk County, Massachusetts district attorney and Knights of Columbus supreme advocate
- Ambrose Ranney, U.S. Congressman
- Anne Sexton, poet
- Frank Henry Shapleigh, painter
- Pauline Agassiz Shaw, reformer and philanthropist
- Lysander Spooner, American abolitionist, writer, and anarchist
- Amy Wentworth Stone, children's writer
- Lucy Stone, suffragist
- Anna Eliot Ticknor, distance learning pioneer
- George Ticknor, founding trustee of the Boston Public Library
- Joseph William Torrey, founder of the American colony of "Ellena" in Borneo
- Joseph Warren, physician and Continental Army patriot killed at Battle of Bunker Hill for whom Warren County, New Jersey is named
- Lawrence Whitney, Olympic bronze medalist
- Mary Evans Wilson, civil rights activist
- John A. Winslow, admiral in American Civil War
- Jacob Wirth, restaurateur
- John DeWolf, maritime fur trader, first American to circumnavigate the world by way of overland across Siberia; uncle of Herman Melville
- Two British war graves for a Royal Field Artillery soldier in World War I and a Merchant Navy sailor in World War II.

== See also ==
- List of cemeteries in Boston, Massachusetts
- National Register of Historic Places listings in southern Boston, Massachusetts
