= Soldiers and Sailors Monument (Boston) =

Monument in Boston, Massachusetts, U.S.

- United States
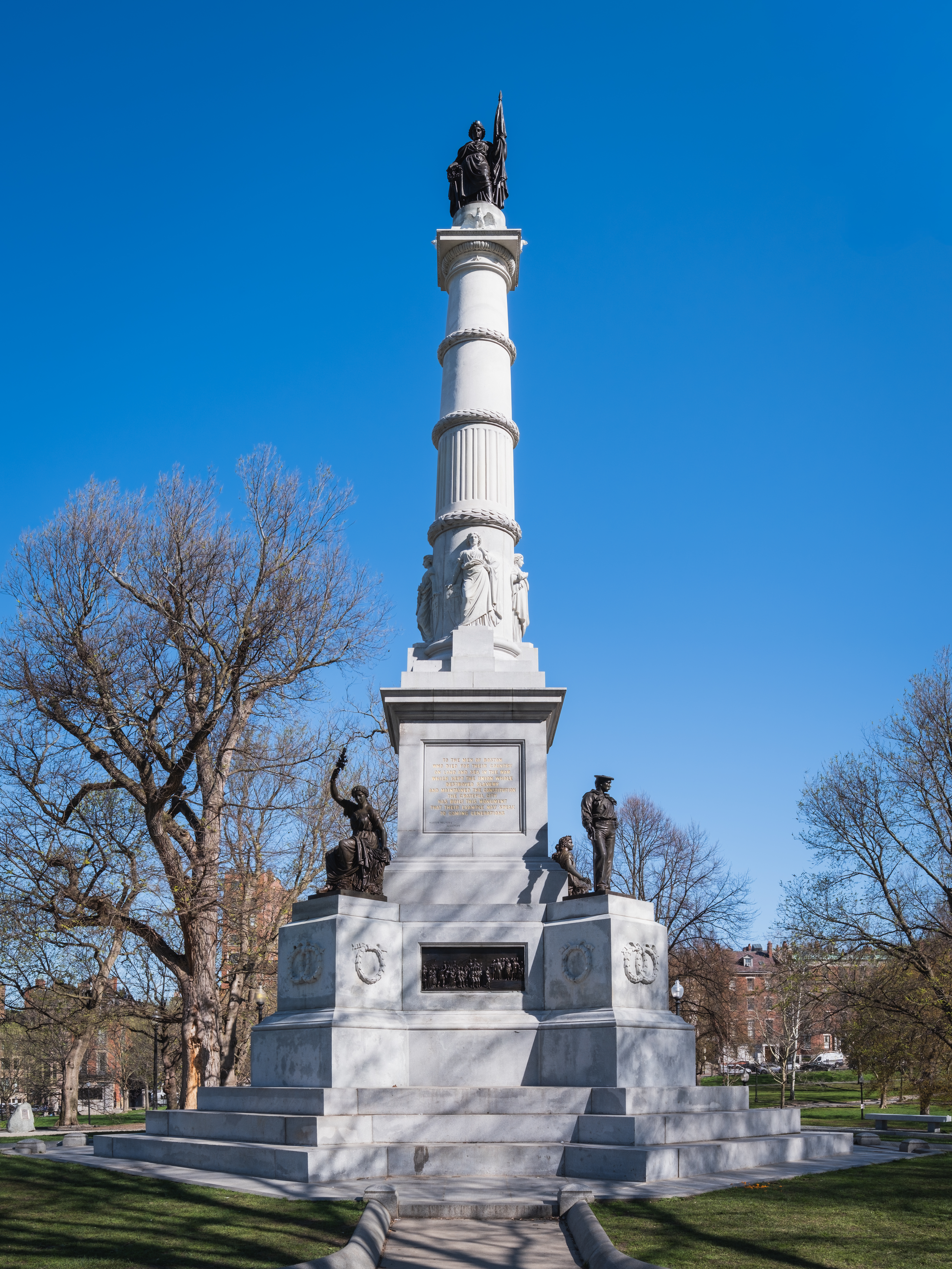
- The monument on Boston Common was erected in 1877.
- For Massachusetts soldiers and sailors who died in the American Civil War
- Unveiled: September 17, 1877
- Location: 42°21′19.7″N 71°3′59.1″W; Boston Common, Boston, Massachusetts
- Designed by: Martin Milmore

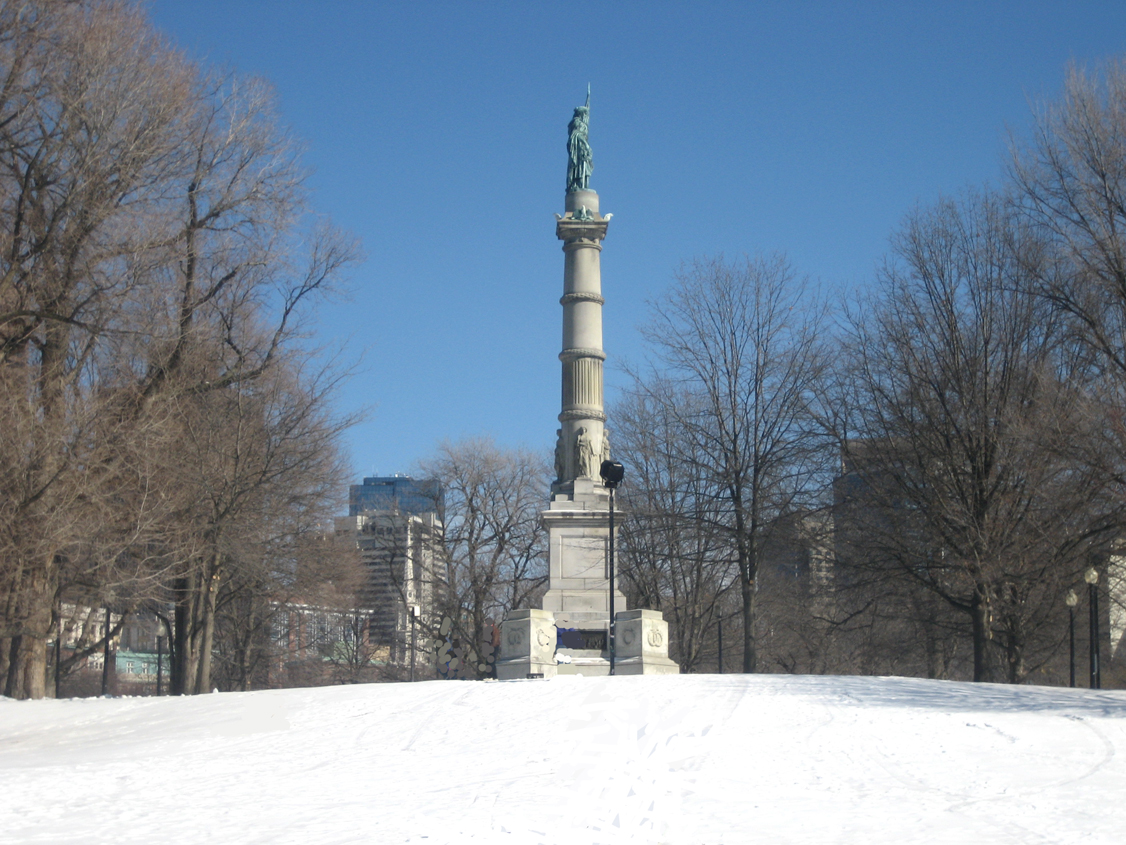
The monument in winter, seen from the west.

The Soldiers and Sailors Monument is a monument erected in Boston Common in downtown Boston, dedicated to soldiers and sailors of the Commonwealth of Massachusetts who died in the American Civil War. Designed by Martin Milmore, construction began in 1874 and the monument was dedicated on September 17, 1877. Union Generals George B. McClellan and Joseph Hooker were among the estimated 25,000 people attending the dedication on Boston Common.

== Overview ==
The Soldiers and Sailors Monument is located on a rise called Flag Staff Hill. The monument is neoclassical in design, taking the form of a victory column carved of Hallowell white granite. The monument rises to a height of 126 feet (38 m). The platform is 38 square feet (3.5 m^{2}) and features four bas-relief bronze tablets. The first tablet is titled The Departure for the War, and depicts a regiment marching by the Massachusetts State House. The second bas-relief tablet depicts the medical care on the battlefield and is titled The Sanitary Commission. The third tablet depicts Union sailors in an engagement between a Federal man-of-war and a Confederate ironclad (likely CSS Virginia). The fourth tablet, entitled The Return from the War, shows a regiment of veterans marching by the State House to present their battle flags to Governor John Albion Andrew.

Above the bas-relief tablets at the base of the column are four 8-foot (2.4 m) carved granite figures representing the northern, southern, eastern and western sections of the reunited nation. The bas reliefs feature images of Edgar Allan Poe and Henry Wadsworth Longfellow.

Bronze statues stand on the corners of the monument to represent peace, holding an olive branch and facing south; history, holding a book and gazing skyward; a sailor, clad in a navy uniform and gazing toward the sea; and the citizen-soldier, wearing an army uniform and standing at ease. The bases that hold the statues were empty for several years leading to conflicting stories that the monument was never finished or the statues had been stolen or placed in storage. The mystery was solved in 2014 when the statues were returned after restoration at the Daedalus Studios in nearby Watertown.

Surmounting the doric column is a bronze allegorical female figure entitled AMERICA. She faces south and wears a tiara of thirteen stars. Her left hand holds the United States flag and her right hand clutches a laurel wreath and sword.

== Inscription ==
The base has the following inscription:
TO THE MEN OF BOSTON
WHO DIED FOR THEIR COUNTRY
ON LAND AND SEA IN THE WAR
WHICH KEPT THE UNION WHOLE
DESTROYED SLAVERY
AND MAINTAINED THE CONSTITUTION
THE GRATEFUL CITY
HAS BUILT THIS MONUMENT
THAT THEIR EXAMPLE MAY SPEAK
TO COMING GENERATIONS

== Gallery ==
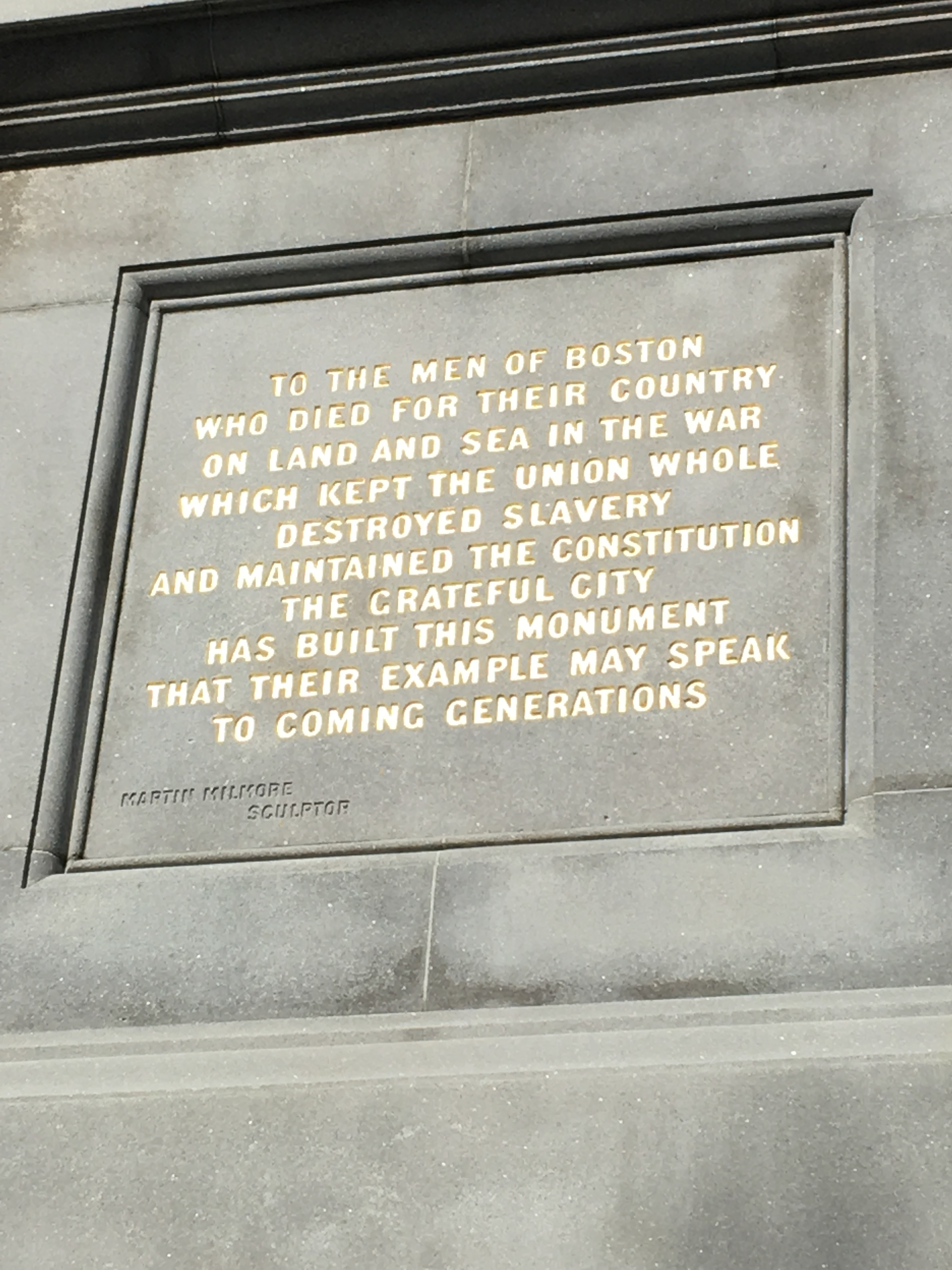

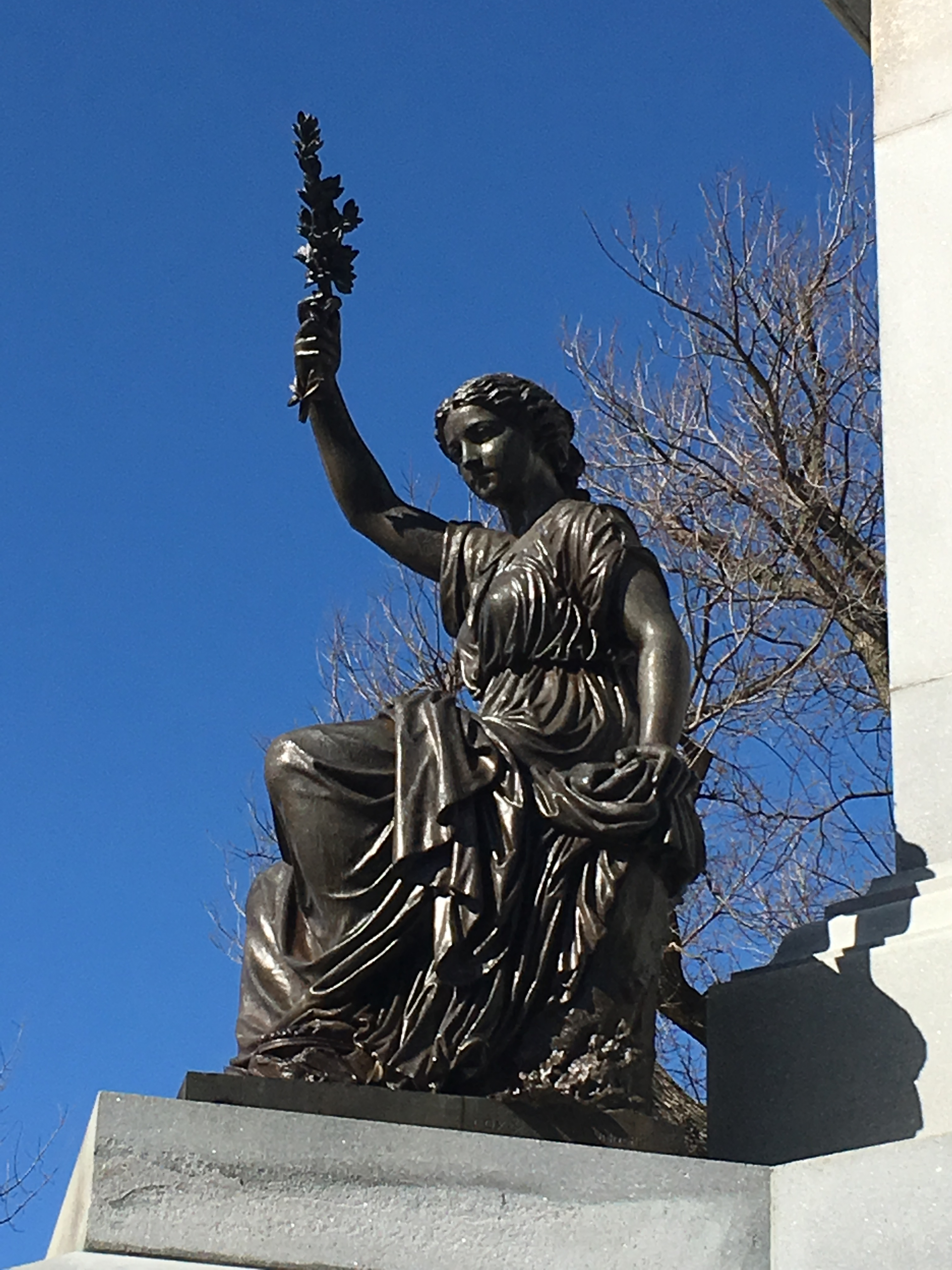

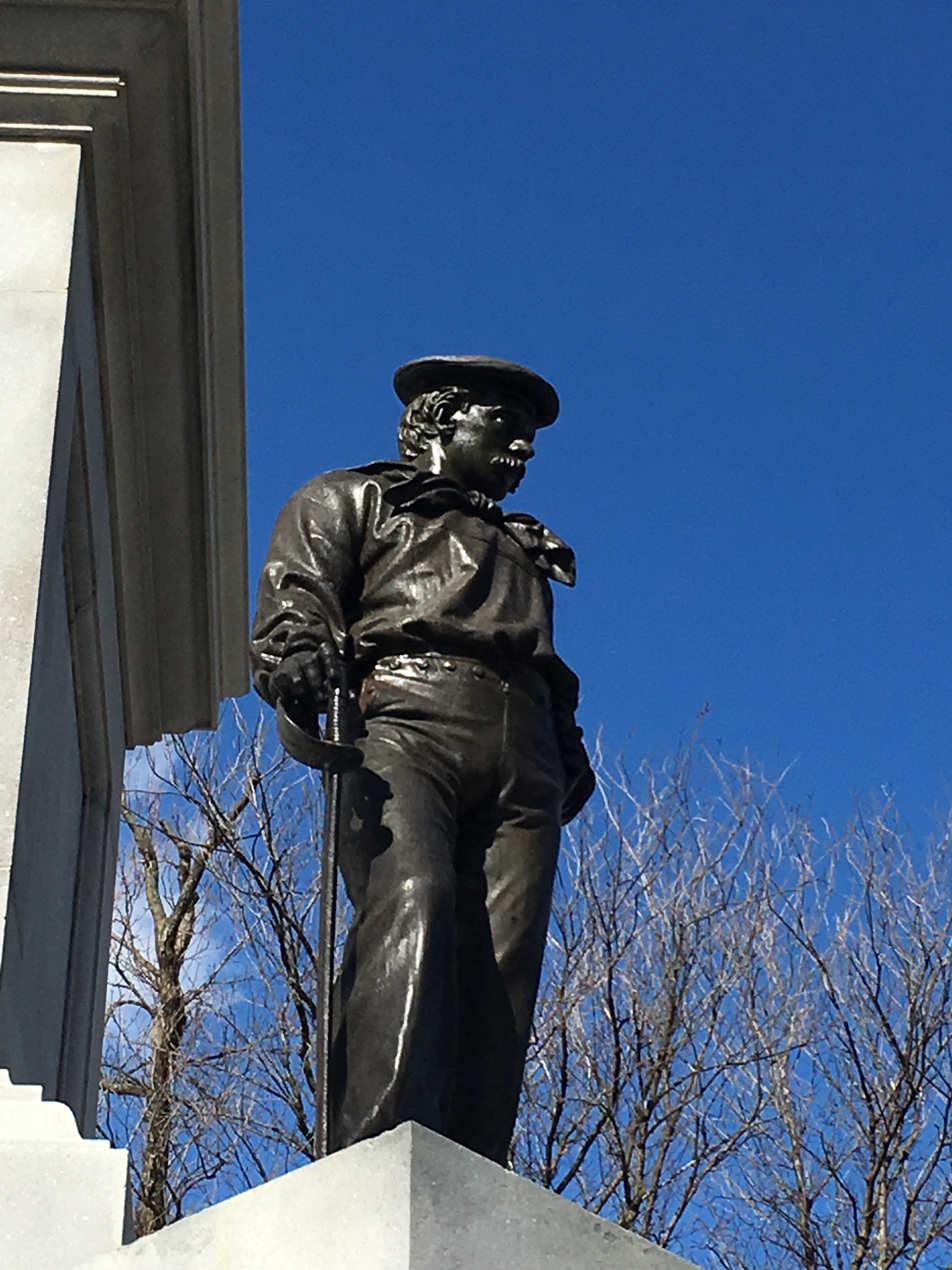

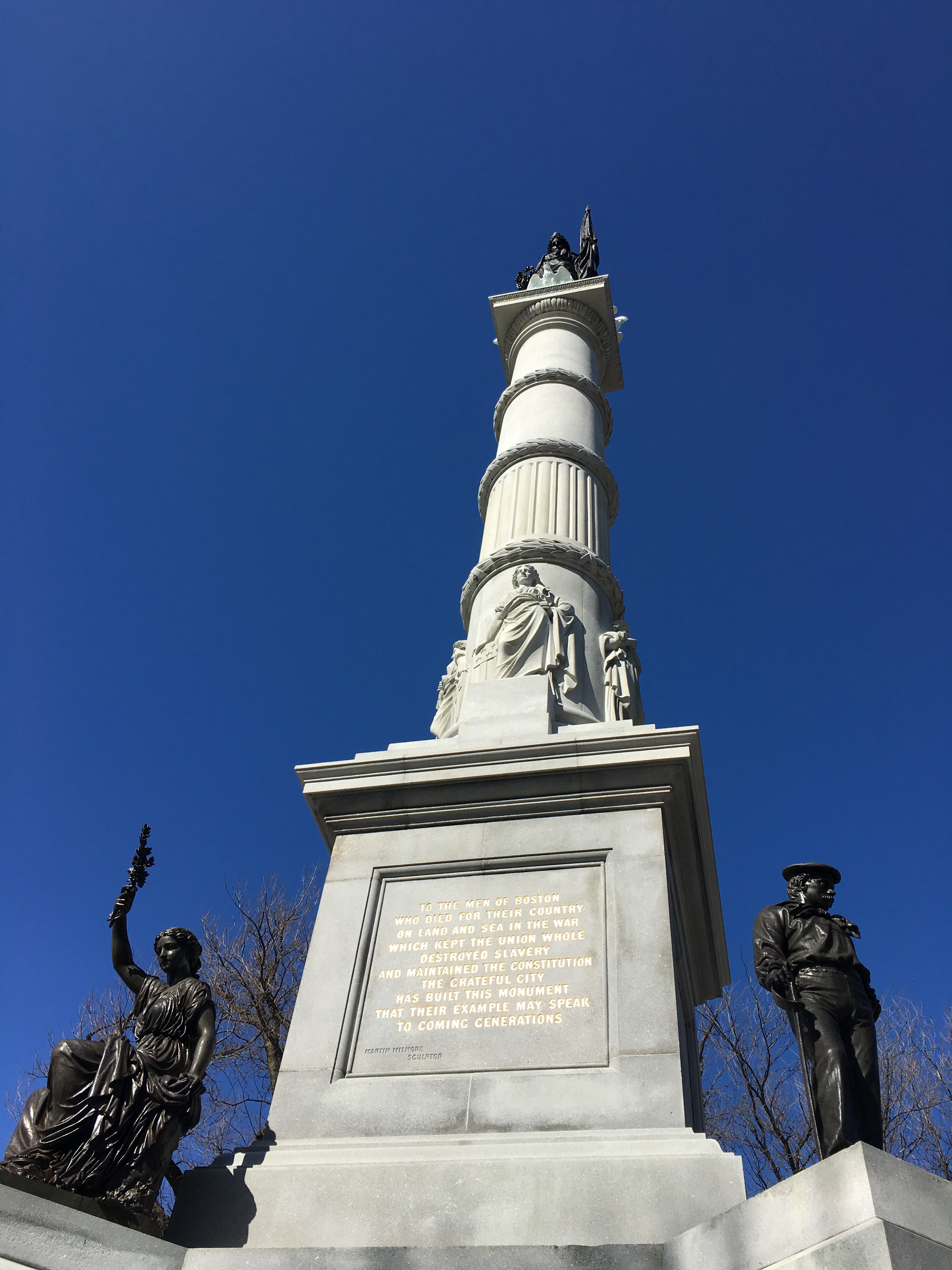
