= James W. Pope =

American lawyer (1856-1937)

Member of the Boston Common Council for Ward 9
- In office 1881
- Preceded by: Henry W. Swift
- Succeeded by: Godfrey Morse

Personal details
- Died: February 11 or 12, 1937 (aged 80) Boston, Massachusetts, United States
- Party: Republican
- Education: Boston University School of Law

James W. Pope (1856–1937) was an American lawyer who was the second African American to serve on the Boston Common Council.

== Career ==
Pope was elected to represent Ward 9 on the Common Council in 1880 and was seated on January 6, 1881. He was defeated for reelection in 1881. Pope later blamed his vote to allow the Irish National Land League to use Faneuil Hall for his loss. After leaving the council, Pope moved to Chase City, Virginia and practiced law. In 1882, his right leg was amputated after a pistol went off in his pocket. By 1896, Pope was once again living in Boston. From 1929 to 1934, Pope was a master in chancery. Pope was found dead in his Pemberton Square law office on February 15, 1937. It was believed that he had died three or four days prior.

== Family ==
Pope's grandson, Lincoln Pope Jr., served in the Massachusetts House of Representatives from 1957 to 1964. His granddaughter, Doris Pope, was the wife of Herbert L. Jackson.
