= Godfrey Morse =

German-born Jewish-American lawyer

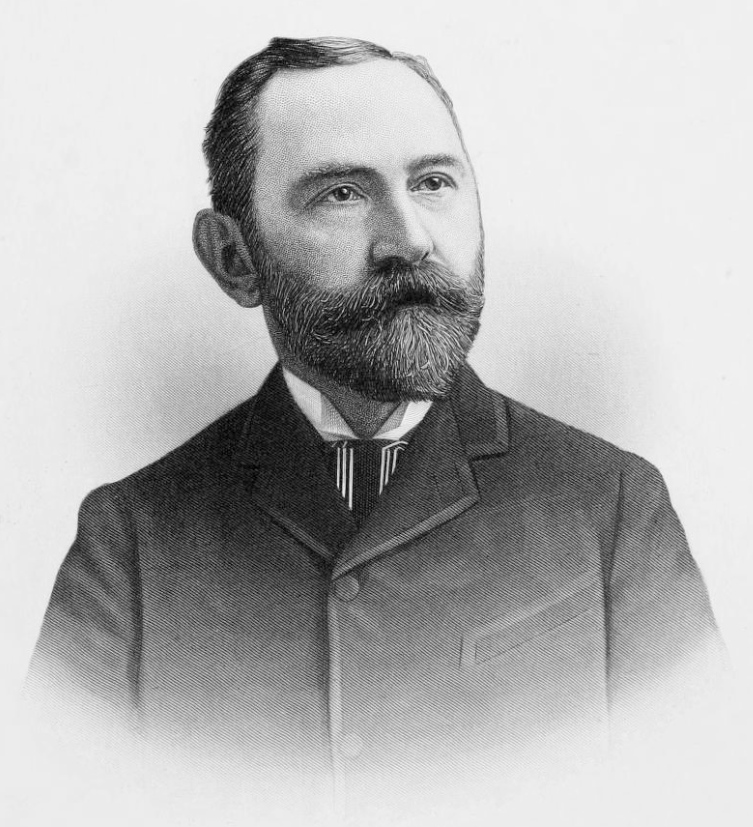

President of the Boston Common Council
- In office June 24, 1883 – January 7, 1884
- Preceded by: James Joseph Flynn
- Succeeded by: John Henry Lee

Member of the Boston Common Council for Ward 9
- In office 1882–1883
- Preceded by: James W. Pope
- Succeeded by: Alfred D. Foster / Herbert L. Harding

Member of the Boston School Committee
- In office 1876–1878

Personal details
- Born: May 19, 1846 Wachenheim, Bavaria
- Died: June 20, 1911 (aged 65) Dresden, Germany
- Resting place: Forest Hills Cemetery
- Party: National Democratic Party
- Spouse: Janet Rosenthal Conrad (m. 1907)
- Relations: Leopold Morse (brother)
- Education: Harvard College; Harvard Law School
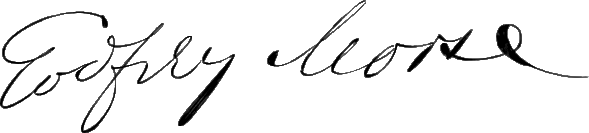
- Signature

Godfrey Morse (May 19, 1846 – June 20, 1911) was a Jewish-American lawyer from Massachusetts.

== Life ==
Morse was born on May 19, 1846, in Wachenheim, Kingdom of Bavaria, the son of Jacob Maas Morse and Charlotte Mehlinger. His brother was American Congressman Leopold Morse.

Morse immigrated to America when he was eight and lived in Boston, Massachusetts. He attended the Brimmer Grammar School, the Boston English High School, and the Boston Latin School. He entered Harvard College in 1867, and while there he was editor of The Harvard Advocate and manager of the first Harvard crew to be taken abroad and row against Oxford. He graduated from Harvard in 1870 with an A.B., the first Jew from Boston to graduate from Harvard. He then went to Harvard Law School, graduating from there in 1872. After graduating, he studied law in the office of law firm Brooks & Ball. He also taught English literature and arithmetic in the Boston Evening High School in the winter of 1872. He was admitted to the bar in 1873. He practiced law in Boston for the rest of his life, and his later became associated with Lee M. Friedman and Percy A. Atherton.

Morse was a member of the Boston School Committee from 1876 to 1878. He served on the Boston Common Council from 1882 to 1883 and was elected its president in 1883. From 1882 to 1884, he was assistant counsel of the United States in the Court of Commissioners of Alabama Claims. In 1887, he was elected a trustee of the Boston Dental College. In 1890, he received an honorary M.A. degree from Tufts College. He was a delegate to the 1896 National Democratic Party Convention in Indianapolis, Indiana, and from 1897 to 1898 he was chairman of the Massachusetts State Committee and the Boston City Committee of the National Democratic Party. By 1904, he was vice-president of the Boston Home for Incurables and the Elysium Club, president of the Purim Association, the Leopold Morse Home for Infirm Hebrews and Orphanage, the Boston Federation of Jewish Charities, and the Boston Branch of the Alliance Israélite Universelle, and a member and trustee of various charitable and semi-public organizations.

Morse was a director of the Allouez Mining Company, a trustee of the American Surety Company of New York, Master of the local Freemason lodge, and a member of the University Club of Boston, the Boston Athletic Association, the Criterion Club, and the Manhattan Club. In 1907, he married Janet Rosenthal Conrad.

Morse died in Dresden, Germany while visiting there with his wife on June 20, 1911. His body was returned to America on the SS Kaiser Wilhelm II. Rabbi Charles Fleischer conducted the funeral service at the Forest Hills Cemetery chapel, and it was attended by a number of people associated with him in the legal profession, politics, and various institutions and organizations. He was buried in Forest Hills Cemetery.
