= Louis Cornish =

American religious leader (1870-1950)

- c. 1918
- Born: Louis Craig Cornish; April 18, 1870; New Bedford, Massachusetts, US
- Died: January 7, 1950 (aged 79); Orlando, Florida, US
- Education: Harvard College
- Occupation: Religious leader
- Spouse: Frances Eliot Foote (m. 1906)

Louis Craig Cornish (April 18, 1870 – January 7, 1950) was an American Unitarian religious leader.

== Biography ==
At Harvard, c. 1893

Louis Cornish was born in New Bedford, Massachusetts on April 18, 1870. He earned a "certificate without academic degree" at Harvard College in 1893.

He married Frances Eliot Foote in Boston on June 14, 1906.

He served as president of the American Unitarian Association from 1927 to 1937.

During that period, the Great Depression made it difficult for him to carry out his duties. But he worked for international religious cooperation and led an investigation in the 1920s into the alleged persecution of Unitarians in Romania. He also visited the Philippines to establish connections with Unitarians there following the theological leadership of Bishop Gregorio Aglipay. Cornish and his wife Frances co-authored a book about the Independent Church movement in the Philippines in 1942, The Philippines Calling. In 1947 he published Transylvania, The Land Beyond the Forest.

Cornish died at Florida Sanitarium in Orlando on January 7, 1950.

A "Louis C. Cornish 'Living the Mission' Award" has been awarded since 1999 in his honor by the Unitarian Universalist Partner Church Council (UUPCC).
