= Firemen's Memorial (Boston) =

Sculpture in Boston, Massachusetts, U.S.

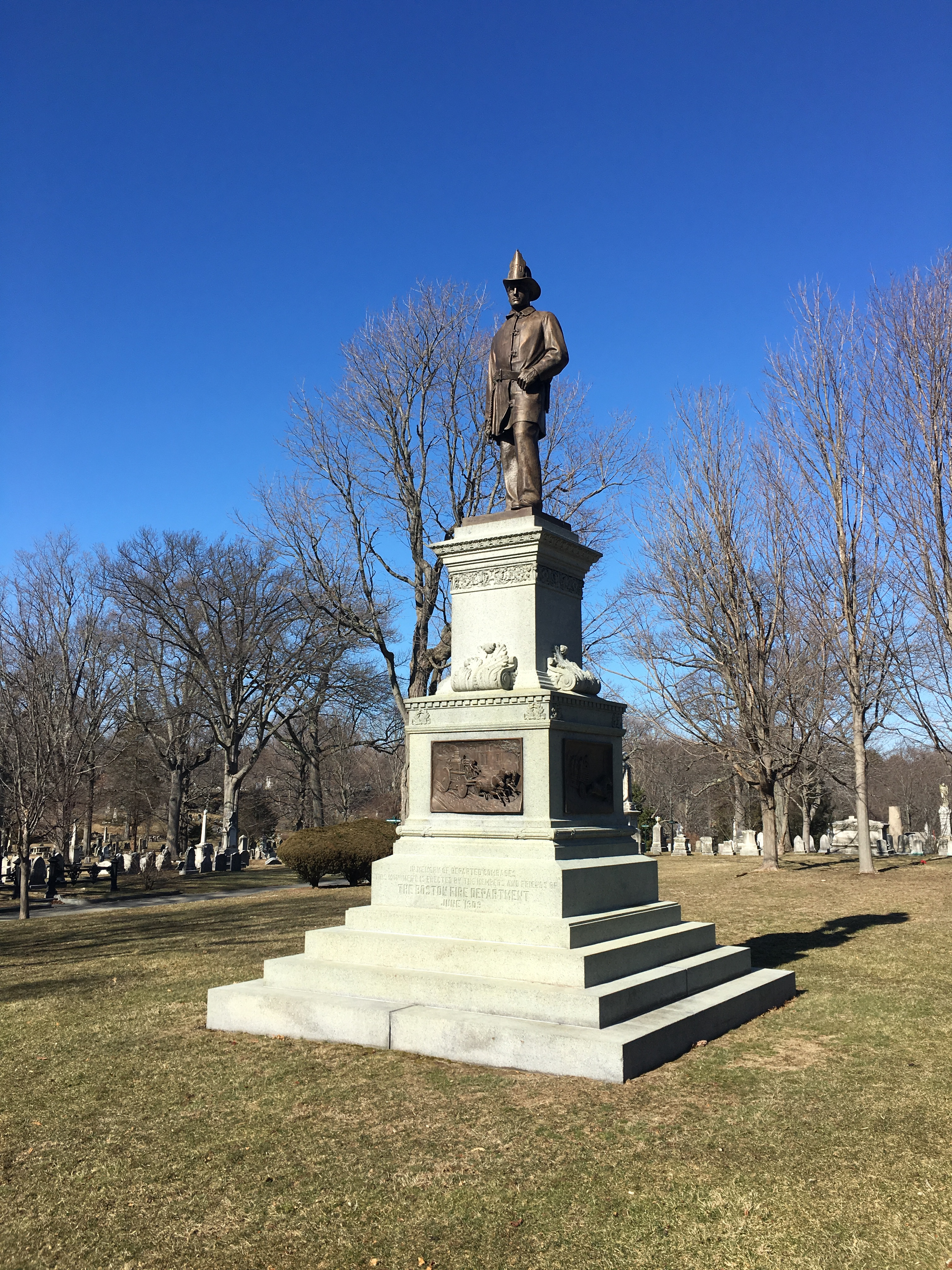
- Artists: John A. Wilson and Louis Maurer
- Year: 1909
- Type: Statue and bas relief
- Medium: Bronze and granite
- Location: Boston, Massachusetts, United States; 42.29241°N 71.10881°W

Firemen’s Memorial is a statue located in Forest Hills Cemetery, Jamaica Plain, Boston. It was built by the city of Boston in 1909.

== Gallery ==
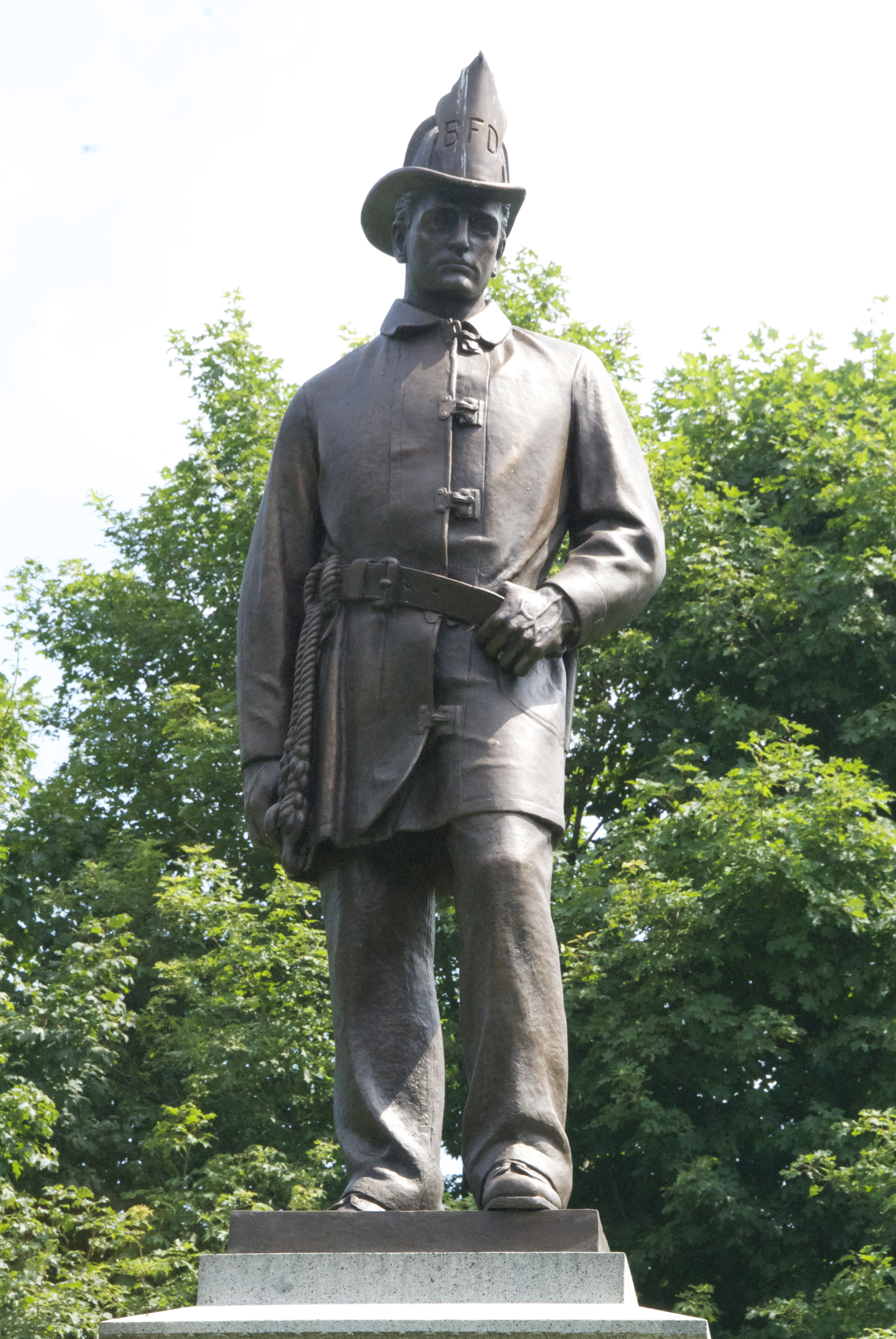
Firemen's Memorial

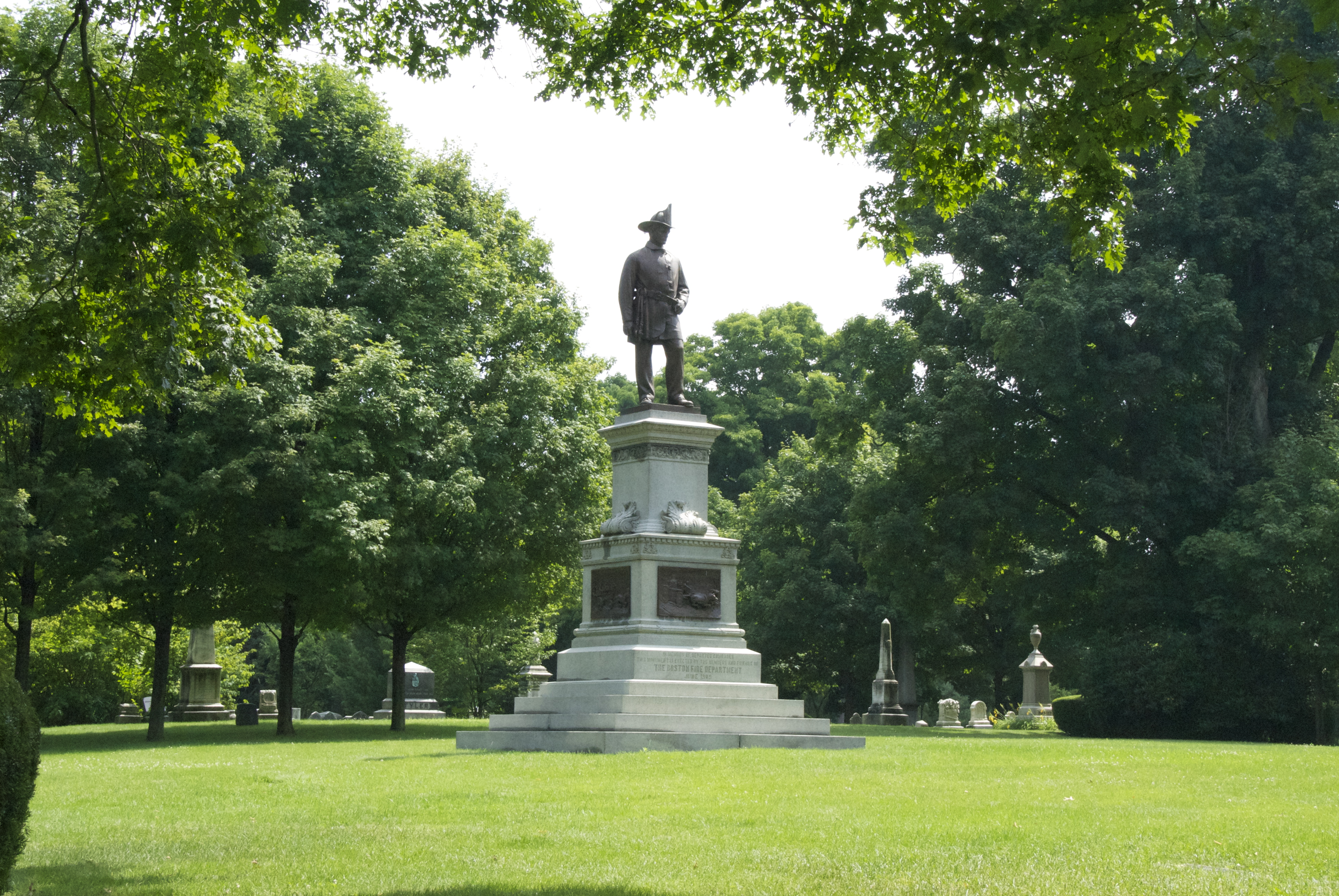

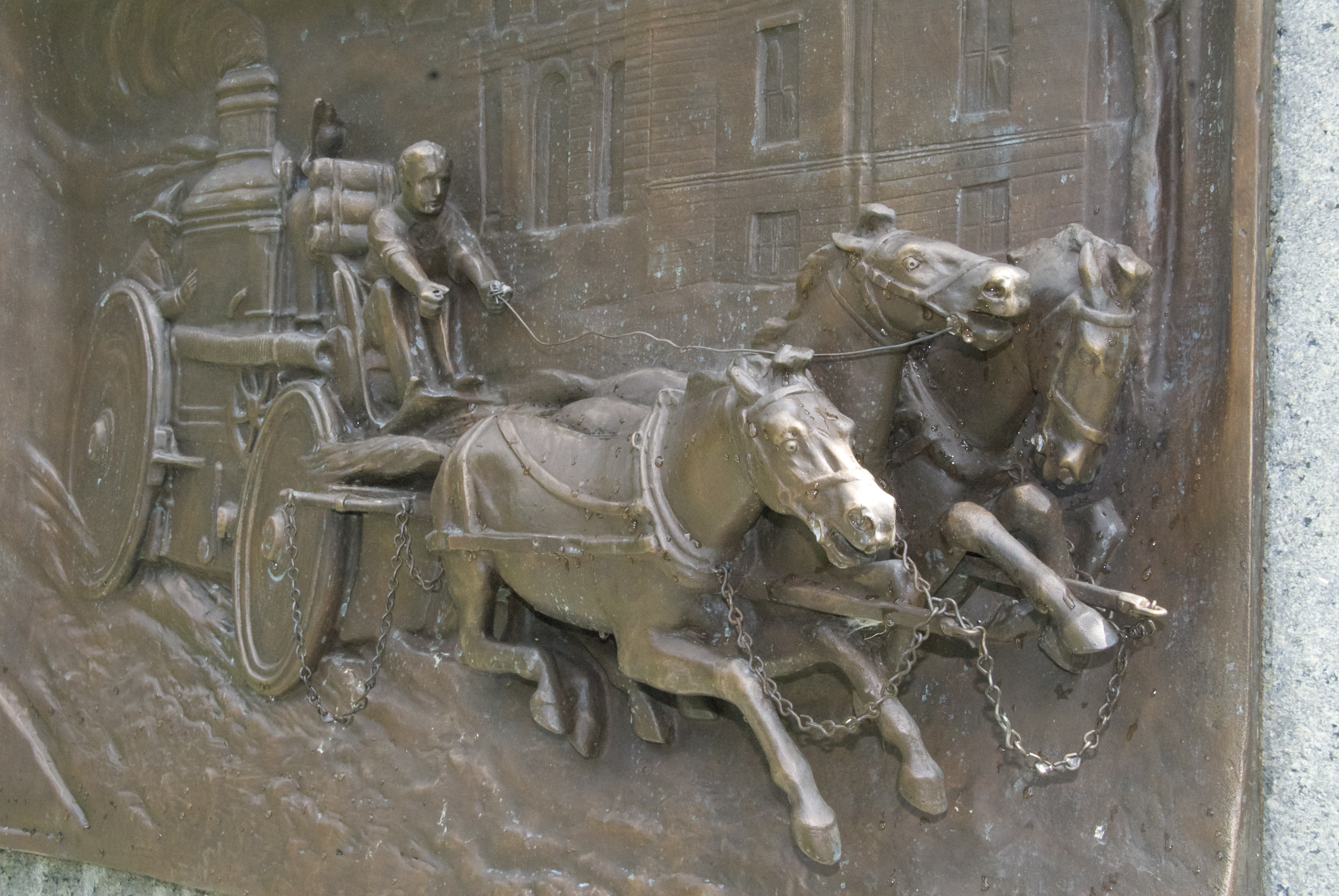
Firemen's Memorial - Panel 1

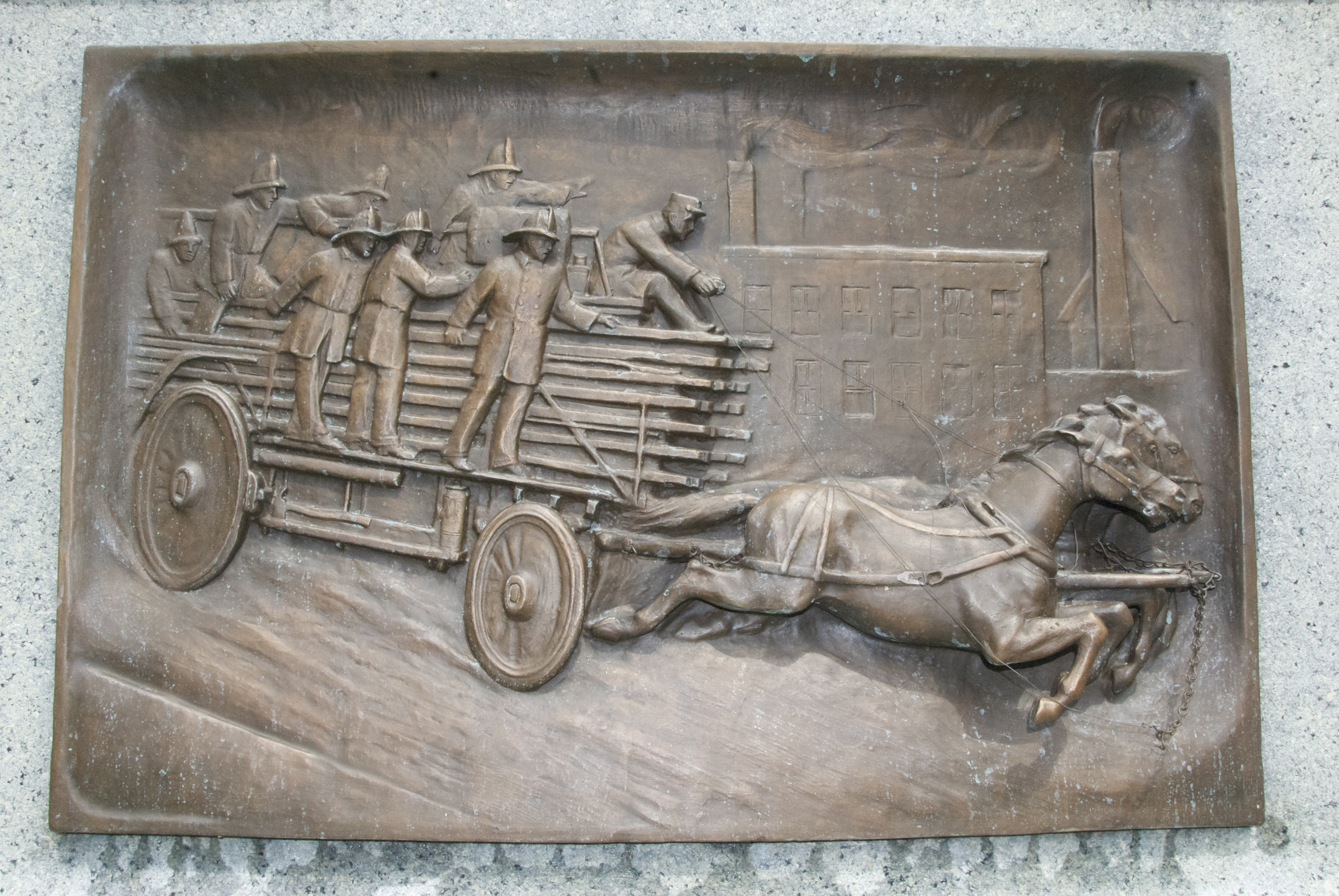
Firemen's Memorial - Panel 2

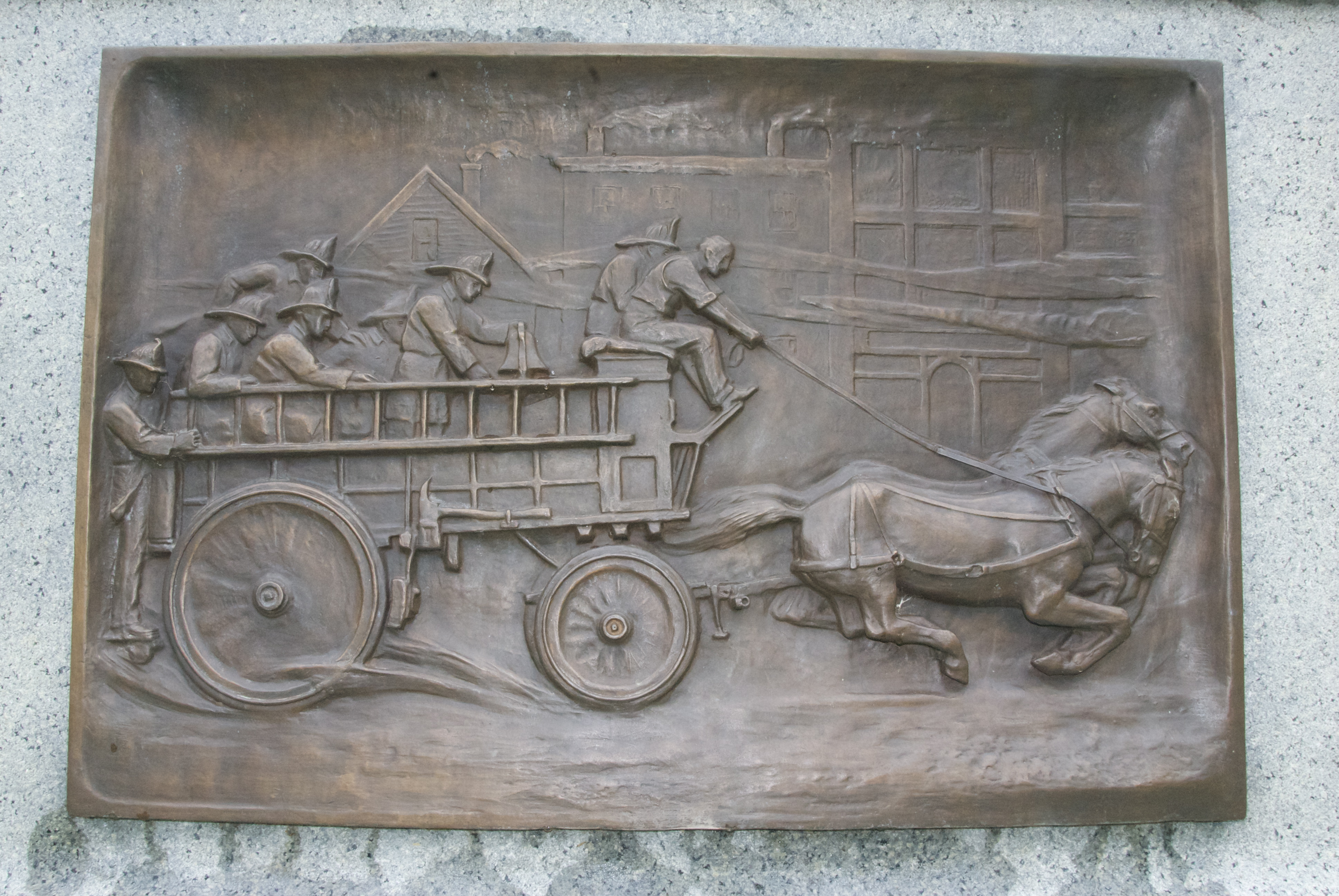
Firemen's Memorial - Panel 3

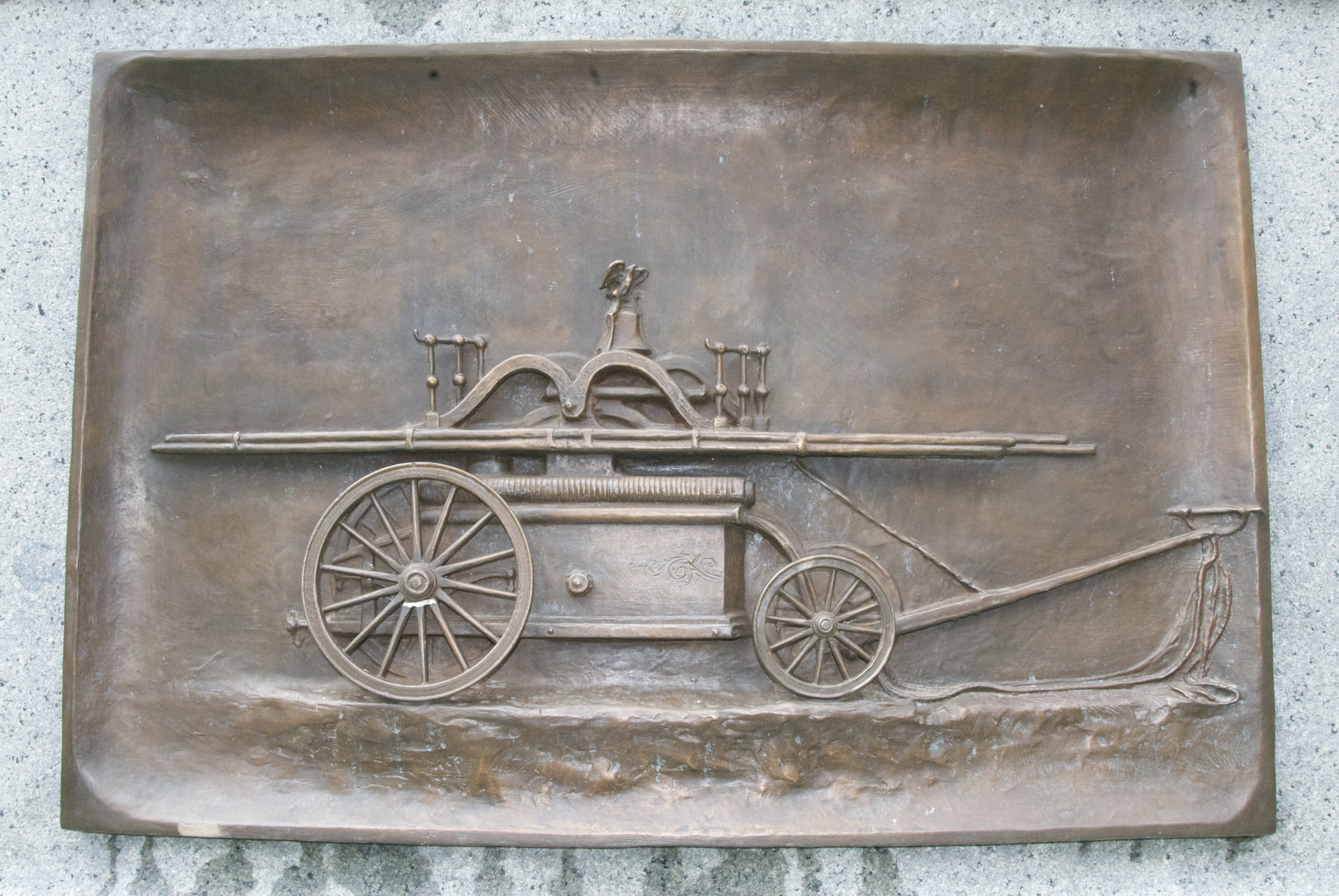
Firemen's Memorial - Panel 4

== See also ==
- List of firefighting monuments and memorials
