= Maine State Library =

Coordinates: 44.3060°N 69.7828°W

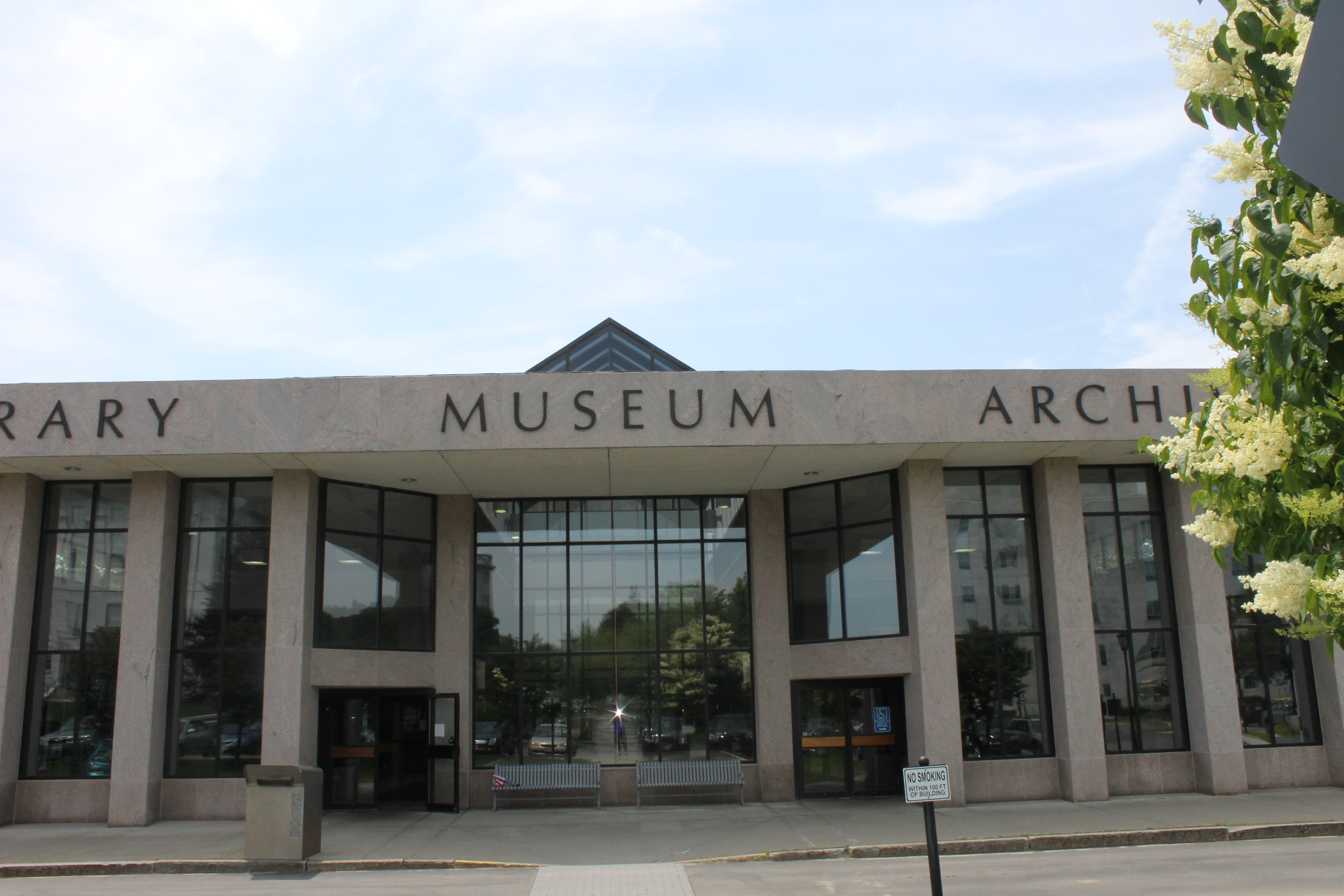
Maine State Library

The Maine State Library is an agency of the State of Maine and located in Augusta, Maine.

== History ==
The Maine State Library began when the Maine Legislature authorized the purchase of books in 1836 and as a result, the State Library began to grow. It is “the principle depository for all state documents...” The Maine State Library distinguishes itself in that it is not only strategically located, but it provides resources and services to citizens and librarians alike. It is guided by the Maine Library Commission, a 17-member board that is appointed by the Governor. The members represent the “State's libraries and ensure geographic diversity and broad individual experiences” and “establishes the policies and operations of the State Library, gives advice and makes recommendations on the expenditure of state and federal funds, and establishes guidelines and policies for statewide library programs." The Maine State Library adheres to its mission in a hands-on approach. It is shifting from its more traditional role of collecting and selecting information to now “facilitate, organize, and access information.”

== Divisions ==
- Public and Outreach Services, Research & Innovation Division (Alison Maxell)
- Library Development Division (Janet McKenney)
- Collection Development, Digital Initiatives and Promotion (Adam Fisher)

=== Programs ===
- Digital Maine Library Resources (DML)
- Digital Maine Repository
- Area Reference and Resource Services (ARRCS)
- Maine InfoNet Statewide Systems Resource
- Interlibrary Loan Van Delivery
- Historical Preservation Initiatives and Access

== See also ==
- List of libraries in the United States
