= Hildegard Woodward =

American author and illustrator

- Born: February 10, 1898; Worcester, Massachusetts, U.S.
- Died: December 1977 (aged 79); Newtown, Connecticut, U.S.
- Education: School of the Museum of Fine Arts, Boston
- Occupations: Artist, writer
- Writing career
- Genre: Children's literature
- Notable awards: Caldecott Medal, 1948, 1950

Hildegard Woodward (February 10, 1898 – 15 December 1977) was the author and illustrator of many children's books, two of which were awarded a Caldecott Honor. Woodward's art was not restricted to children's books; her portfolio includes numerous works of fiction and humor for adults. Although most noted for her watercolor illustrations, she painted in oil and was a children's portrait artist.

She was born in Worcester, Massachusetts February 10, 1898. Her parents were Rufus and Stella Woodward. She was educated at the School of the Museum of Fine Arts, Boston and in Paris.

In 1948 she was given a Caldecott Medal for her illustrations of Roger and the Fox written by Lavinia R. Davis and again in 1950 for The Wild Birthday Cake.

In 1953 Woodward painted a mural on the wall of the Center School cafeteria in Brookfield, Connecticut near her residence in Hawleyville.

She began to lose her sight in the 1960, but didn't stop painting. When she went blind she developed a method of "painting by touch".

Woodward never married or had children. She died on December 15, 1977, in Newtown, Connecticut.

Her papers are held at the University of Southern Mississippi and the Children's Literature Research Collection at the University of Minnesota house copies of her original artwork.

== Bibliography ==
- Little World-Children (Ginn, 1928) — written by Elizabeth Ellis Scantlebury
- The Blue Teapot: Sandy Cove Stories (The Macmillan Company, 1931) — written by Alice Dalgliesh
- P-Penny and His Little Red Cart (Lothrop, Lee & Shepard Co., 1934) — written by Amy Wentworth Stone
- Everyday Children (Oxford University Press, 1935)
- In Storyland (Lothrop, Lee and Shepard Co., 1936) — written by Ruth Irma Low
- Here's Juggins (Lothrop, Lee and Shepard, 1936) — written by Amy Wentworth Stone
- Little Miss Capo (Macmillan, 1937) — written by Frances Gaither
- Exploring New Fields (Houghton Mifflin Company, 1938) — written by Beryl Parker; Julia M Harris; Hildegard Woodward; P O Palmstrom
- It Happened in England (Albert Whitman, 1939) — written by Marian King
- The Chosen Baby (Carrick and Evans, 1939) — written by Valentina Pavlovna Wasson
- Yammy Buys a Bicycle (Albert Whitman & Co, 1940) — written by Bernice Morgan Bryant
- Jared's Blessing (Charles Scribner's Sons, 1942)
- Roundabout, Another Sandy Cove Story (Macmillan, 1942) — written by Alice Dalgliesh
- Round Robin (Charles Scribner's Sons, 1943) — written by Lavinia R. Davis
- Country Neighborhood (The Macmillan Company, 1944) — written by Elizabeth Jane Coatsworth
- Roger and the Fox (Doubleday & Co., 1947) — written by Alice Dalgliesh; 1948 Caldecott Honor
- Christmas: A Book of Stories Old and New (Charles Scribner's Sons, 1950) — Written by Alice Dalgliesh
- The Wild Birthday Cake (Doubleday and Company, 1949) — Written by Lavinia R Davis; 1950 Caldecott Honor
- Philippe's Hill (Doubleday, 1950) — written by Lee Kingman
- Summer Is Fun (Doubleday, 1951) — written by Lavinia R. Davis
- Danny's Luck (Doubleday, Jan 1, 1953) — written by Lavinia R. Davis
- The Wonderful Story of How You Were Born (Hanover House, 1953) — written by Sidonie Matsne Gruenberg
- America Travels (Macmillan, 1961) — written by Alice Dalgliesh
- The House On Grandfather's Hill (Charles Scribner's Sons, 1961)
- Time Was Charles Scribner's Sons, 1962)
- Fruit is Ripe for Timothy (Young Scott Book, 1963) — written by Alice Rothschild
