= Sears' Crescent and Sears' Block =

- Sears' Crescent
- U.S. National Register of Historic Places
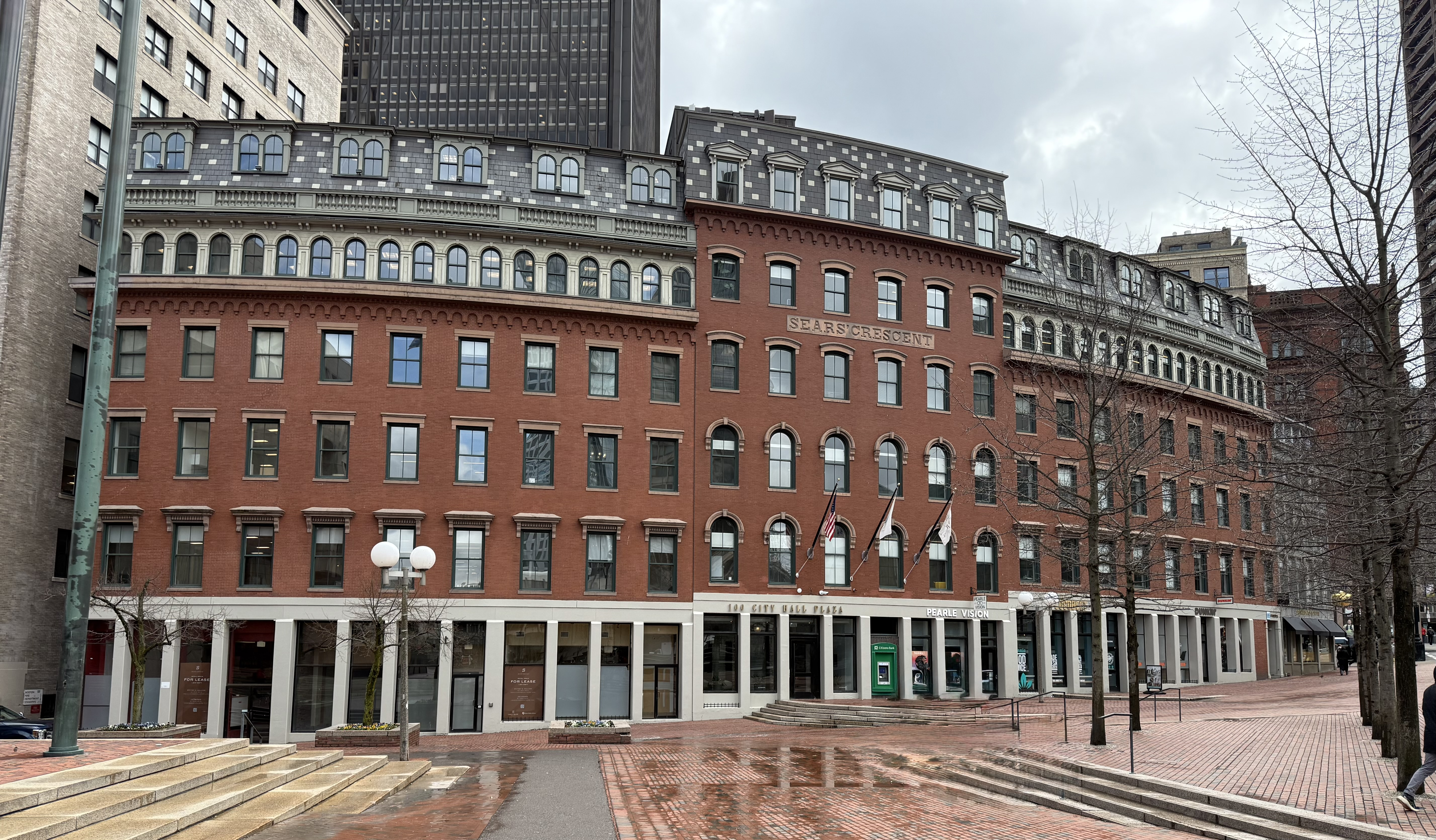
- Sears' Crescent (Sears' Block is at the far right, obsccured by trees)
- Location: 38–68 and 70–72 Cornhill, Boston, Massachusetts
- Coordinates: 42°21′34″N 71°3′34″W
- Built: 1816
- Architectural style: Italianate, Federal
- NRHP reference No.: 86001486
- Added to NRHP: August 9, 1986

Sears' Crescent and Sears' Block are a pair of adjacent historic buildings located along Cornhill in Boston, Massachusetts. It is adjacent to City Hall and Government Center, and is part of City Hall Plaza.

Sears' Crescent was constructed in 1816 as a series of Federal period commercial rowhouses. Around 1860 these were given a unified curving facade with Italianate styling. The Sears' Block, built in 1848, is a rare surviving instance of granite post-and-lintel construction. Both buildings were developed by David Sears, a leading mid-19th-century developer of Boston who was responsible for the filling of Back Bay. They are the only buildings that remain on the original route of Cornhill, one of Boston's oldest streets, most of whose route has been lost or obscured by urban renewal.

The buildings were added to the National Register of Historic Places in 1986.

The Sears' Block is now the location of the "Steaming Tea Kettle", an 1873 trade sign commissioned by the Oriental Tea Company that was located on a Court Street building demolished in 1967 during the construction of Government Center. The kettle was refurbished and reinstalled in 2016 after being damaged, apparently by a truck.

Sears' Crescent was acquired in 2016 by Chevron Partners.

== Image gallery ==
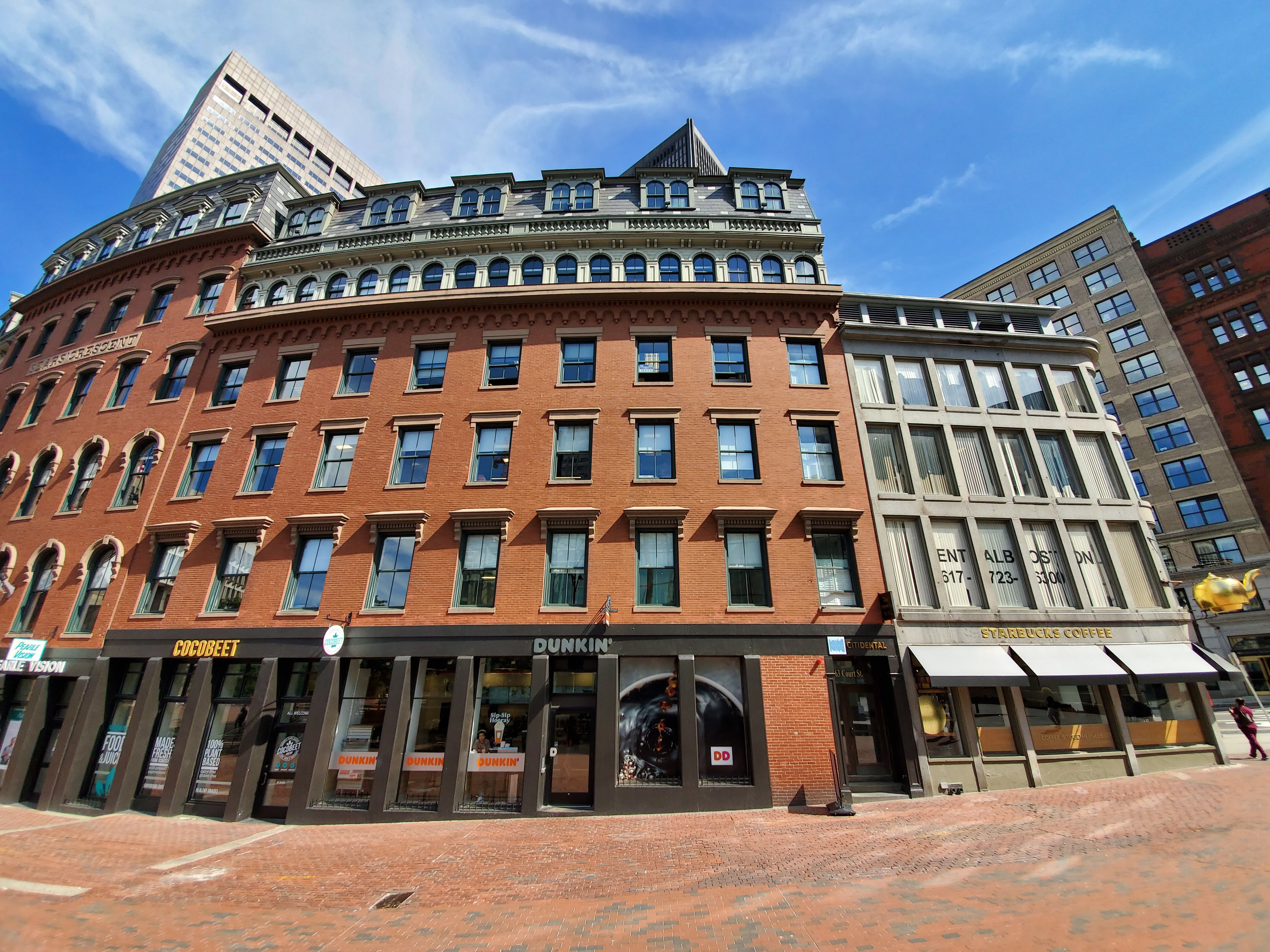
Sears' Crescent, with Sears' block at the right, showing the iconic steaming tea kettle (far right)

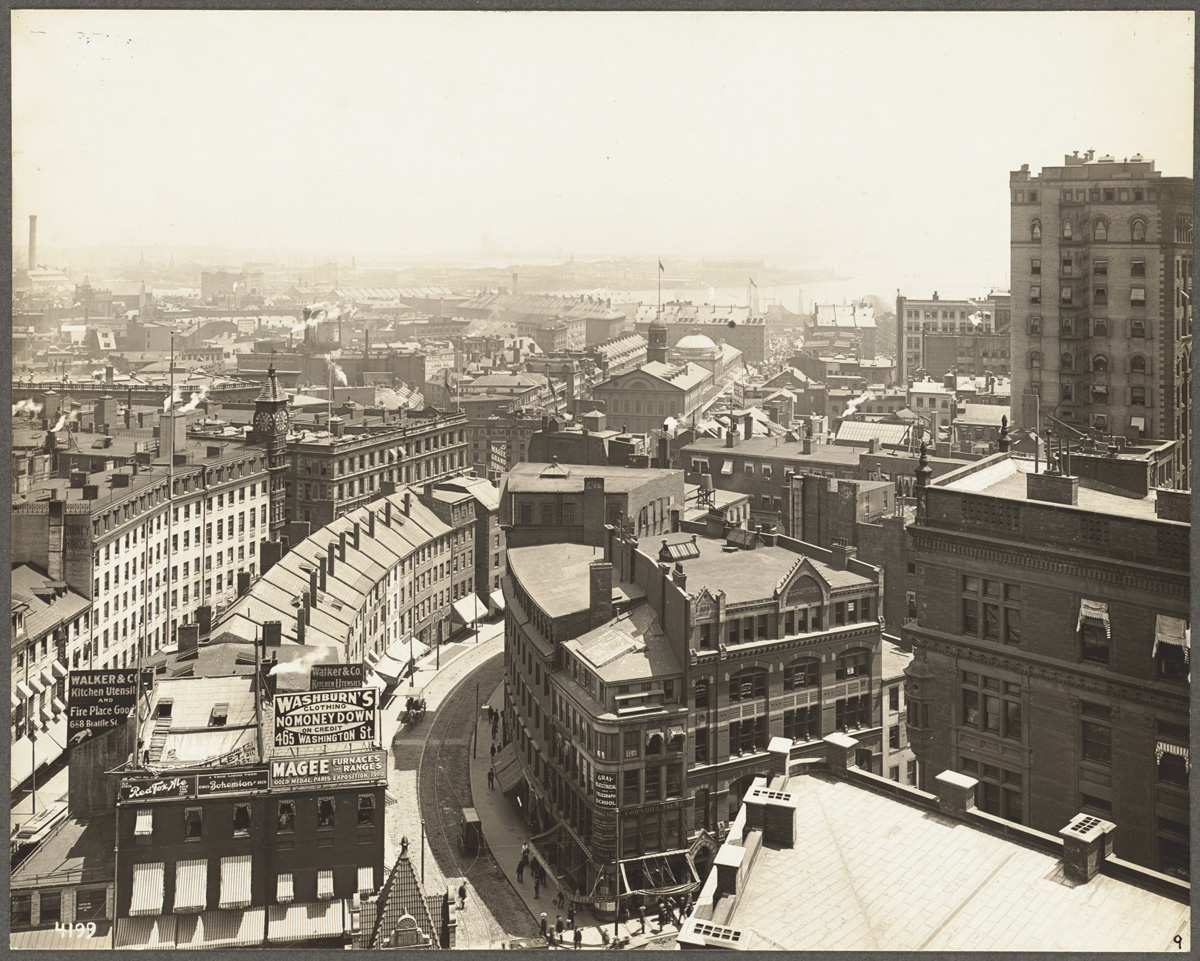
Overview of Cornhill and Brattle Streets, ca.1905

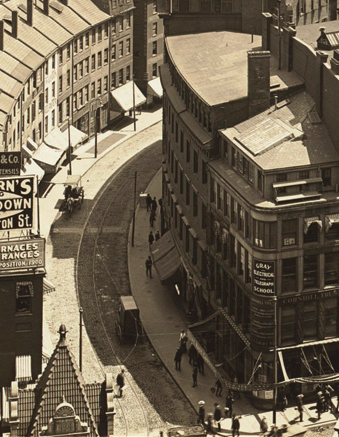
Overview of Cornhill, ca.1905

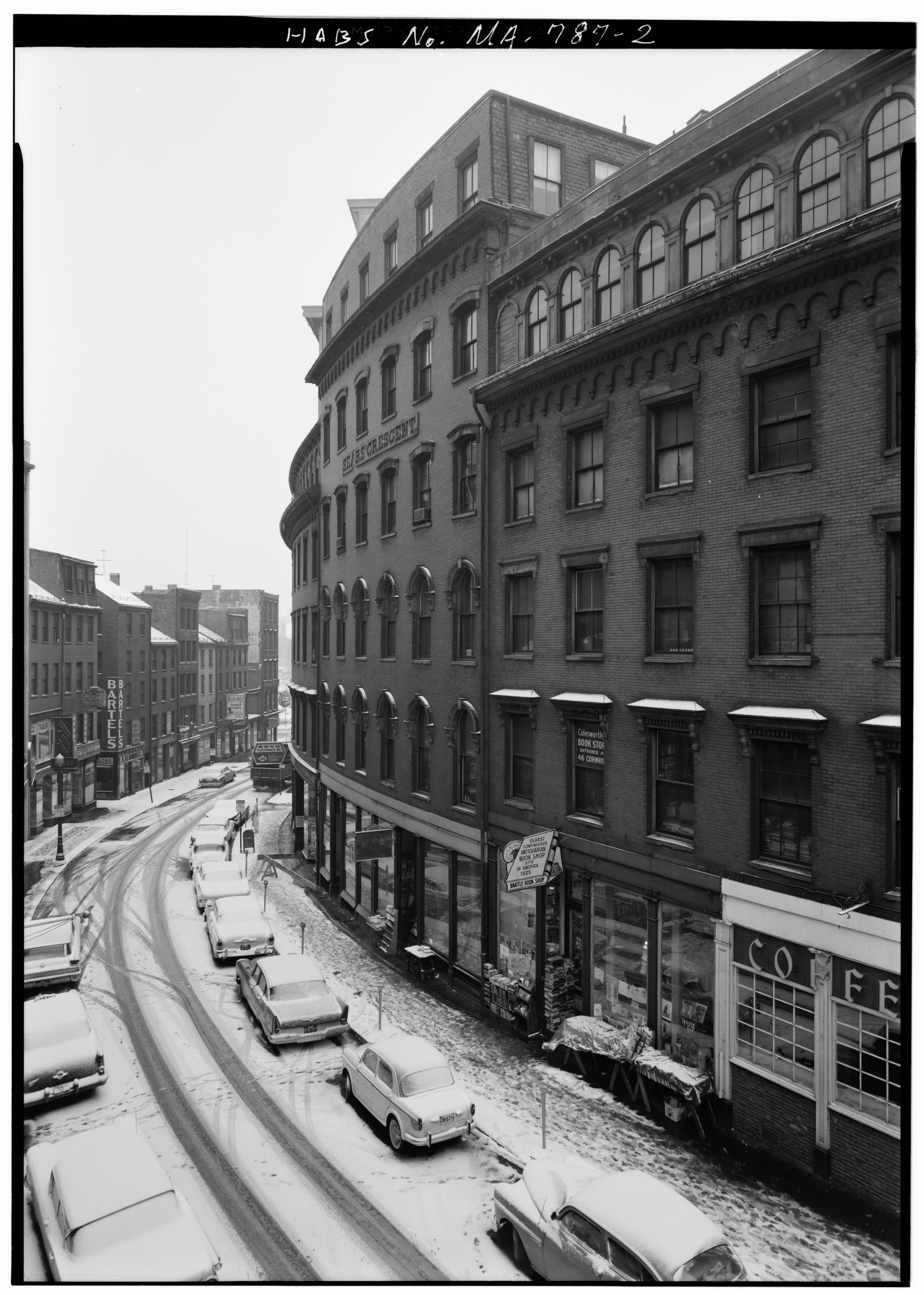
Sears' Crescent, Cornhill, Boston, 1962

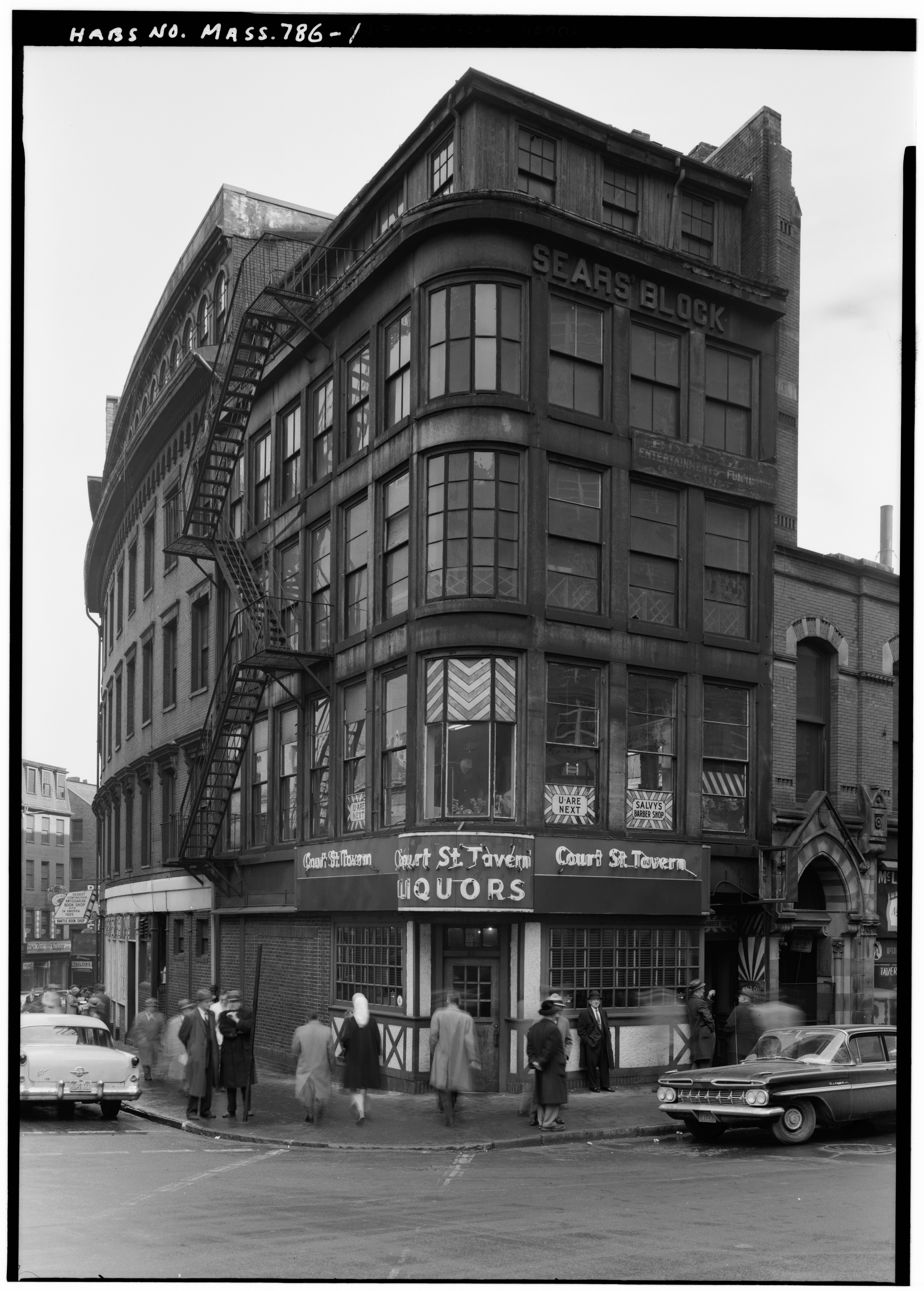
Corner of Cornhill and Court Street, Boston, 1962

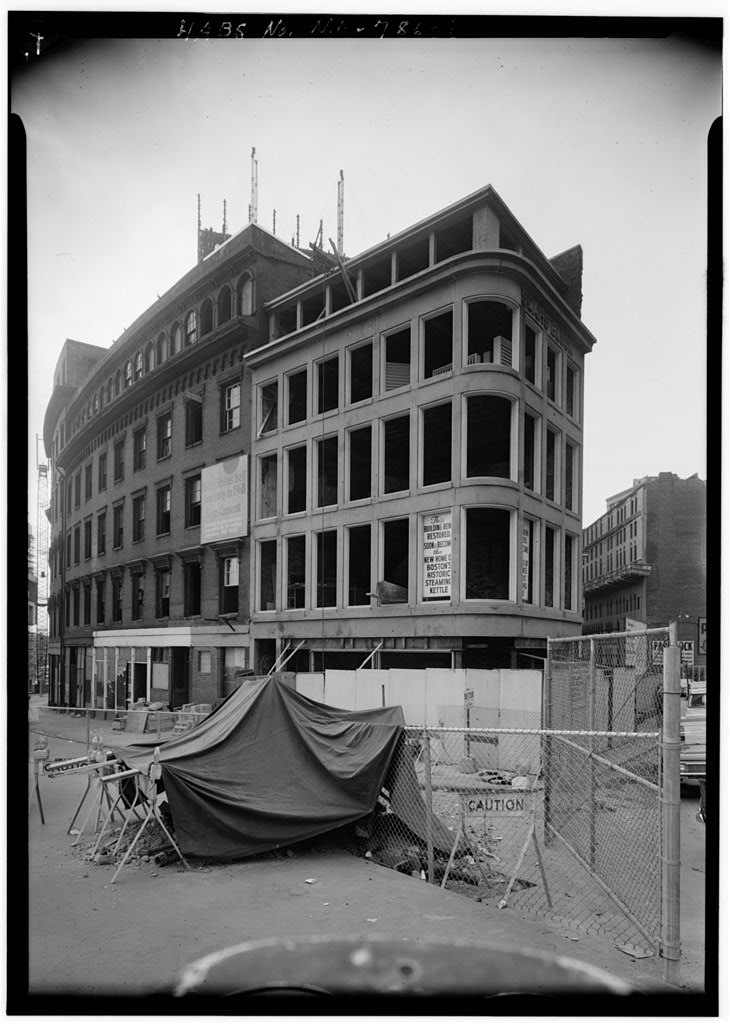
Cornhill, Boston, 1967

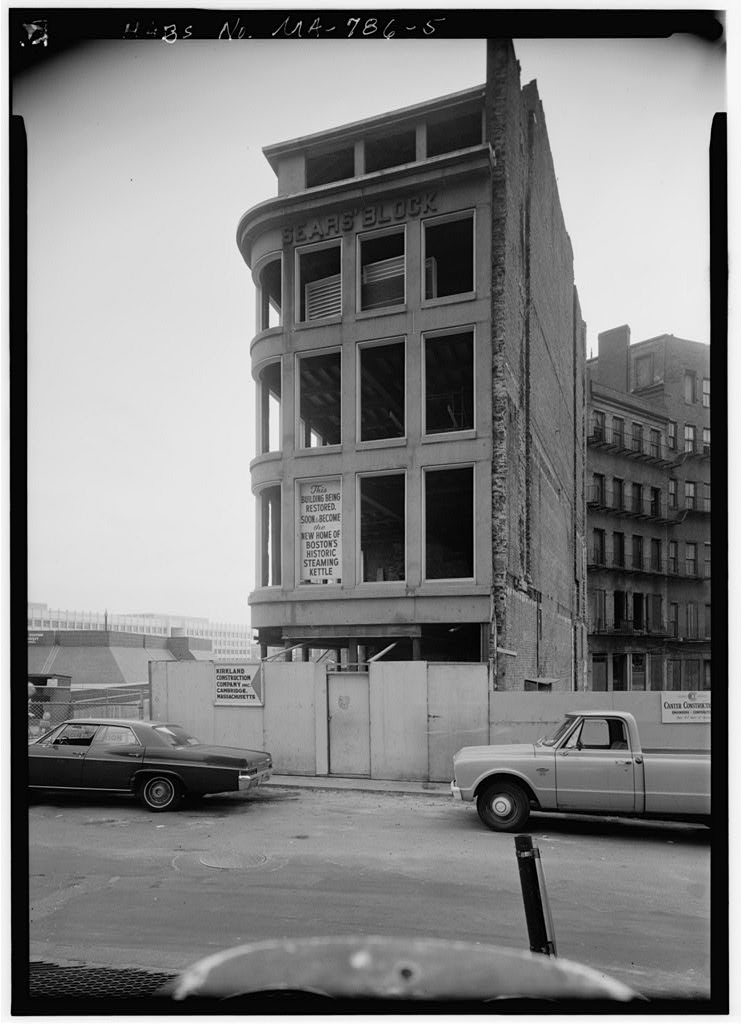
Sears' Block, 1967

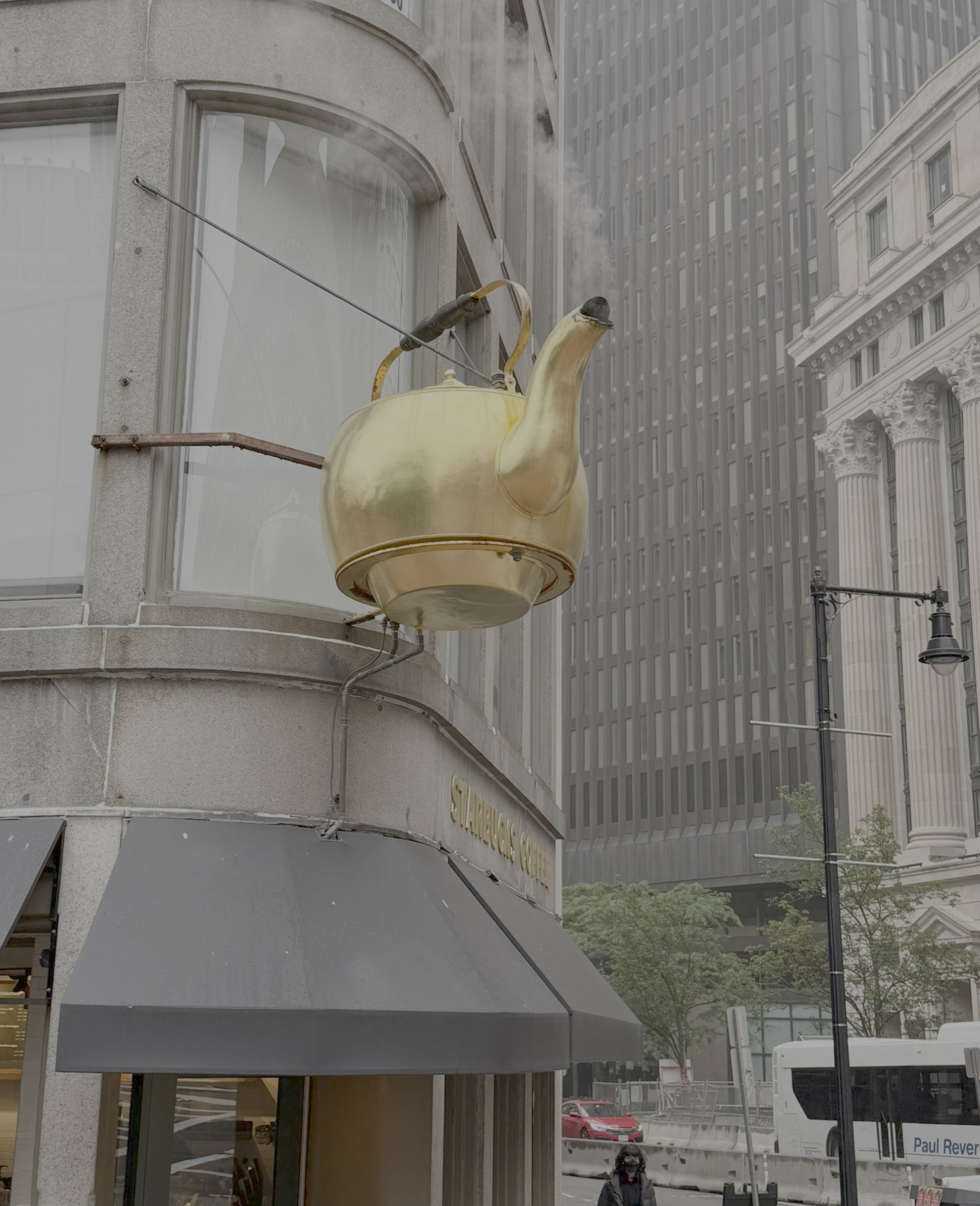
Steaming Tea Kettle on the Sears' Block in 2025

== See also ==
- National Register of Historic Places listings in northern Boston, Massachusetts
