= Brattle Street =

Brattle Street may refer to:

- Brattle Street (Boston) (1694–1962), street in Boston located on the current site of City Hall Plaza
  - Brattle Street Church, Boston
- Brattle Street (Cambridge, Massachusetts), historic street dating to before the American Revolutionary War. Also called the "King's Highway" or "Tory Row".
