= Somerby =

Somerby may refer to:

== Places ==
- Somerby, Leicestershire, a village near Melton Mowbray
- Somerby (Juxta Bigby), a hamlet near Brigg, Lincolnshire
- Somerby by Gainsborough, a hamlet near Gainsborough, Lincolnshire
- Somerby Golf Club and Community in Byron, Minnesota
- Old Somerby, Lincolnshire

== People ==
- Somerby (surname)

== See also ==
- Somersby (disambiguation)
- Sommersby
