= Cornhill (Government Center, Boston) =

Street in Boston, Massachusetts

Coordinates: 42°21′34.58″N 71°3′27.81″W

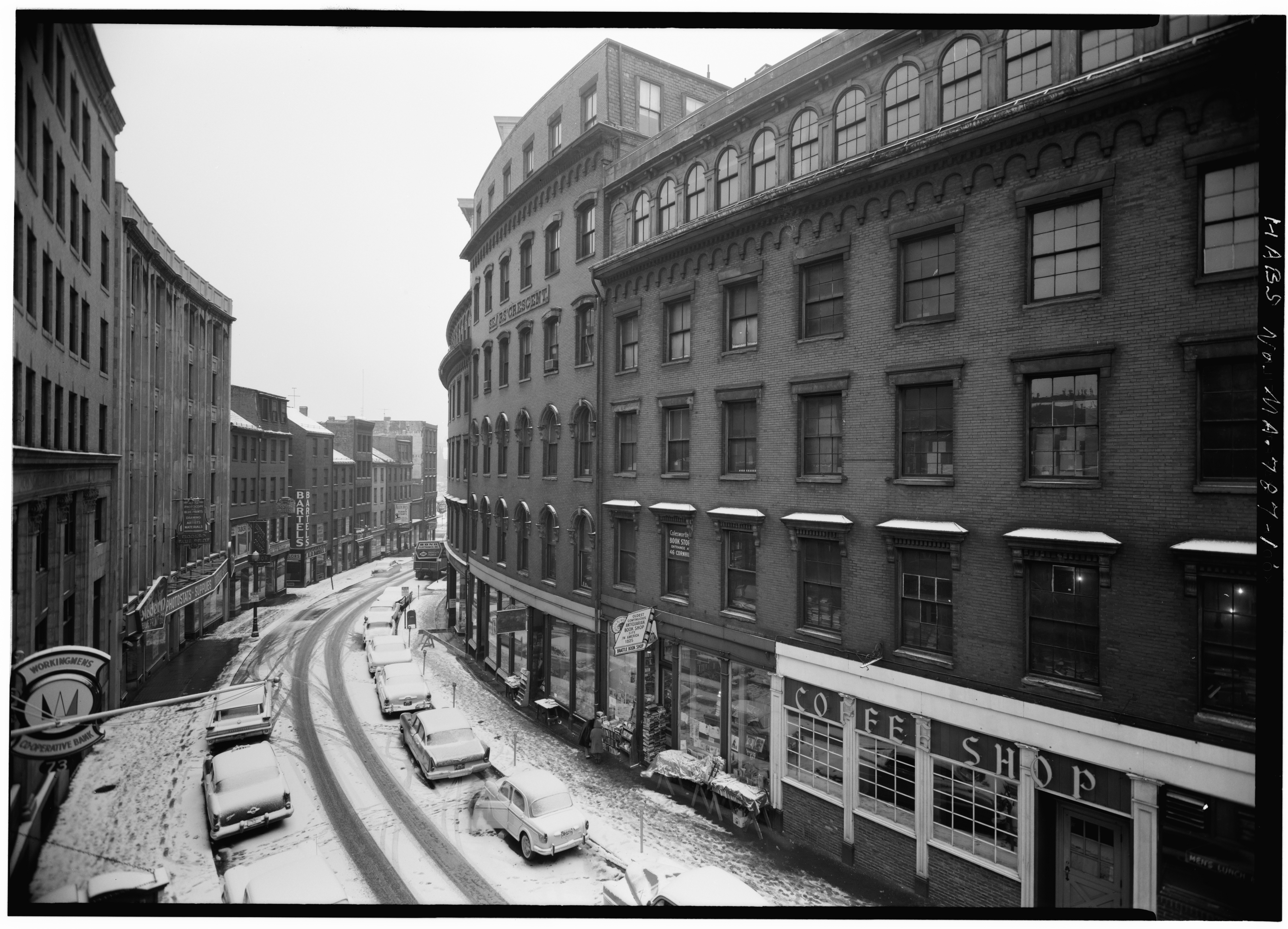
Cornhill, Boston, 1962

Cornhill was a street that existed in Boston, Massachusetts, United States, between the 18th and 20th centuries. It was located on the site of the current City Hall Plaza in Government Center. It was named in 1829; previously it was known as Market Street (1807–1828). In its time, it comprised a busy part of the city near Brattle Street, Court Street and Scollay Square. In the 19th century, it was the home of many bookstores and publishing companies. As of 1969, Cornhill exists as 144 feet along the edge of City Hall Plaza.

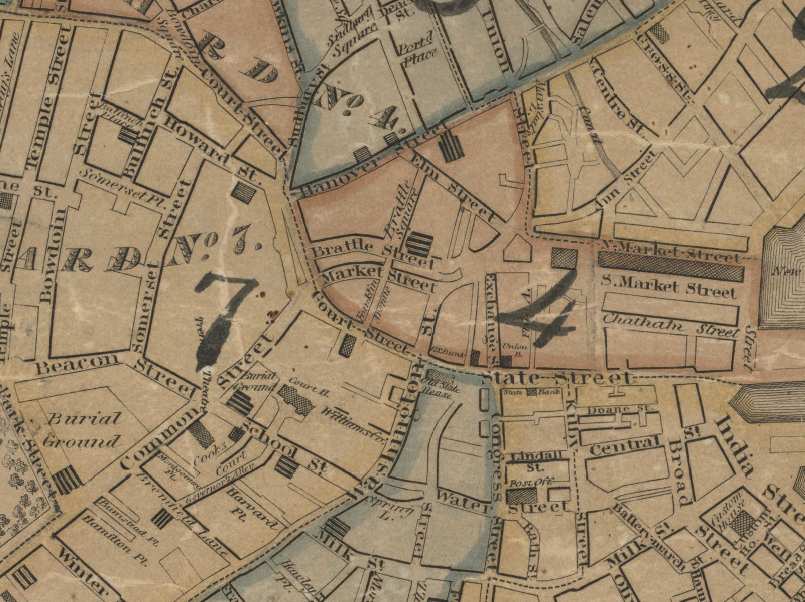
Detail of 1826 map of Boston, showing Market Street (renamed Cornhill in 1828)

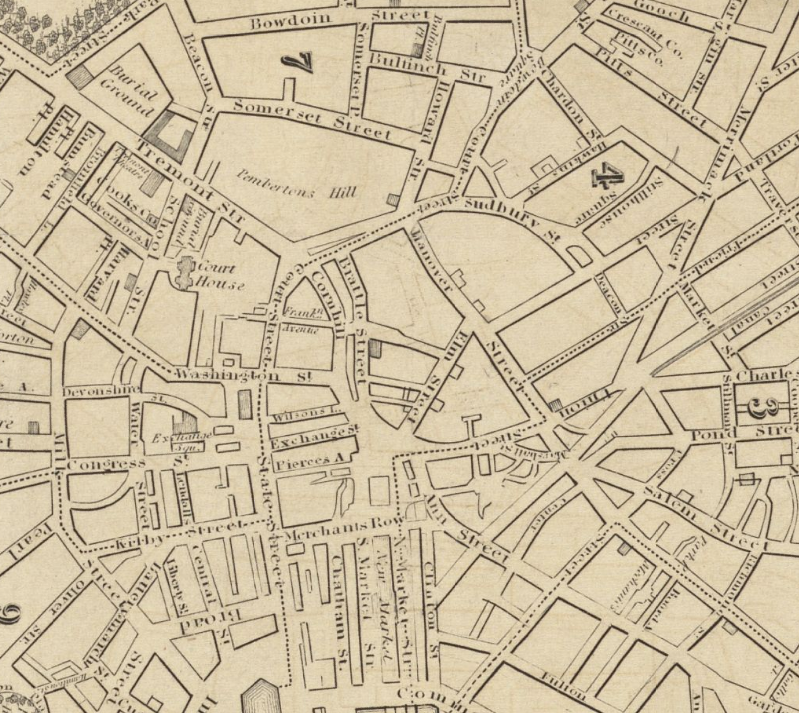
Detail of 1832 map of Boston, showing Cornhill and vicinity

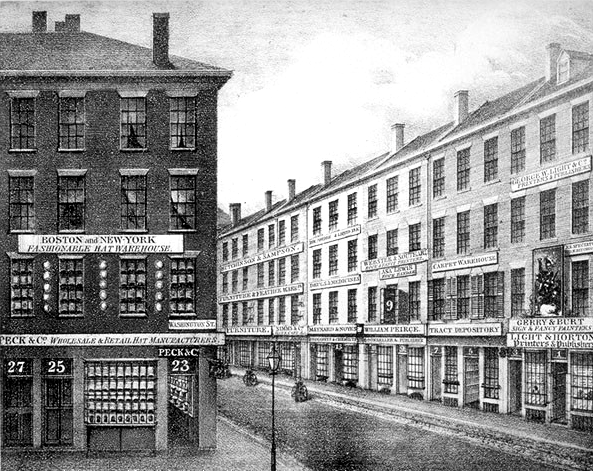
Cornhill, c. 1836. Shows shops of Light & Horton; Gerry & Burt; George W. Light; Peck & Co.; William Peirce; etc.

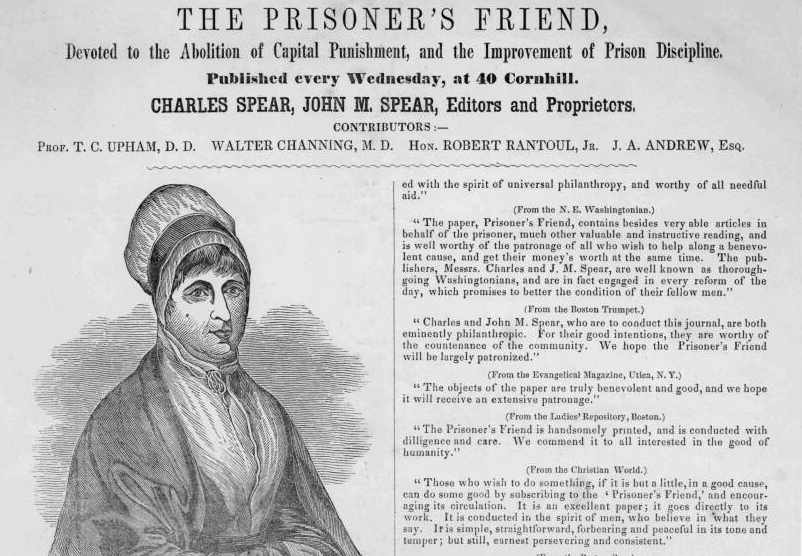
Advertising for the Prisoner's Friend published on Cornhill, c. 1840s. "Devoted to the abolition of capital punishment, and the improvement of prison discipline"

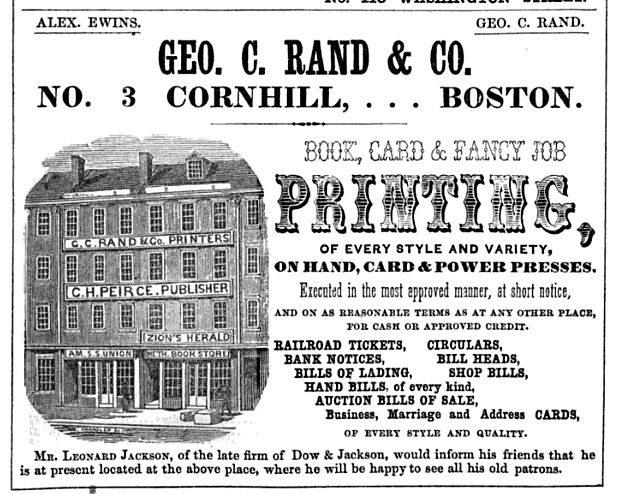
Advertisement for George C. Rand & Co. printers, 1849

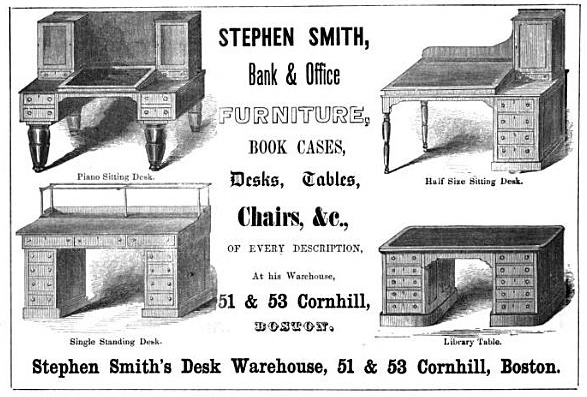
Advertisement for Stephen Smith's Desk Warehouse, 1854

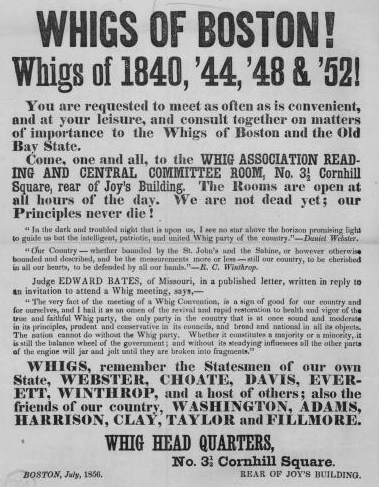
Whig Headquarters, 1856

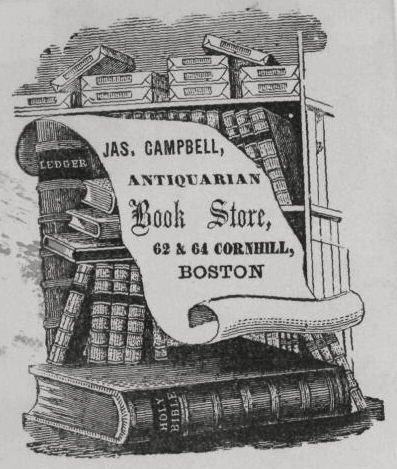
Ad for James Campbell, antiquarian bookshop, c. 1860s

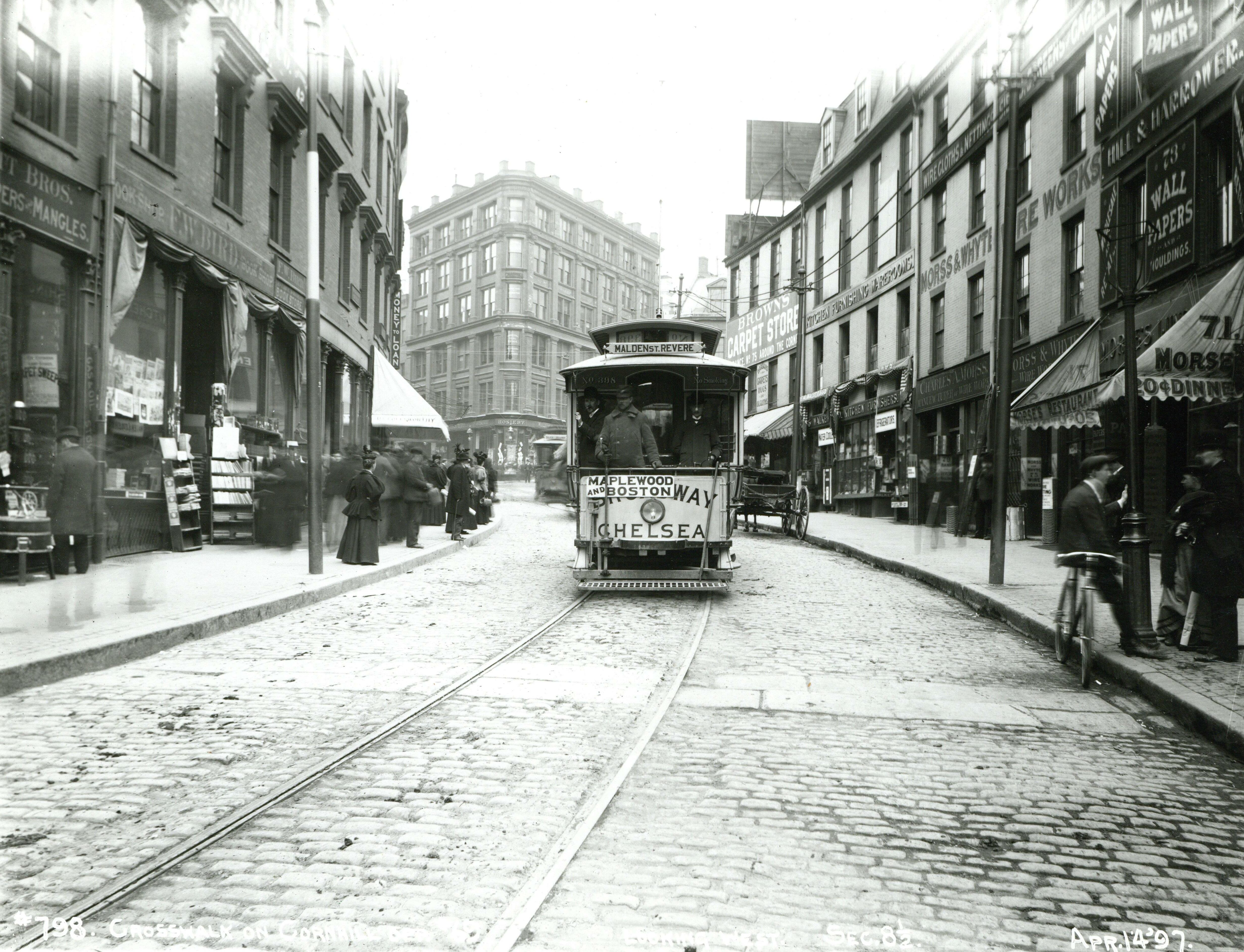
c. 1897

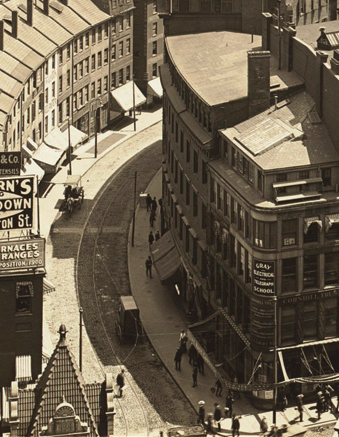
Cornhill, Boston, c. 1905

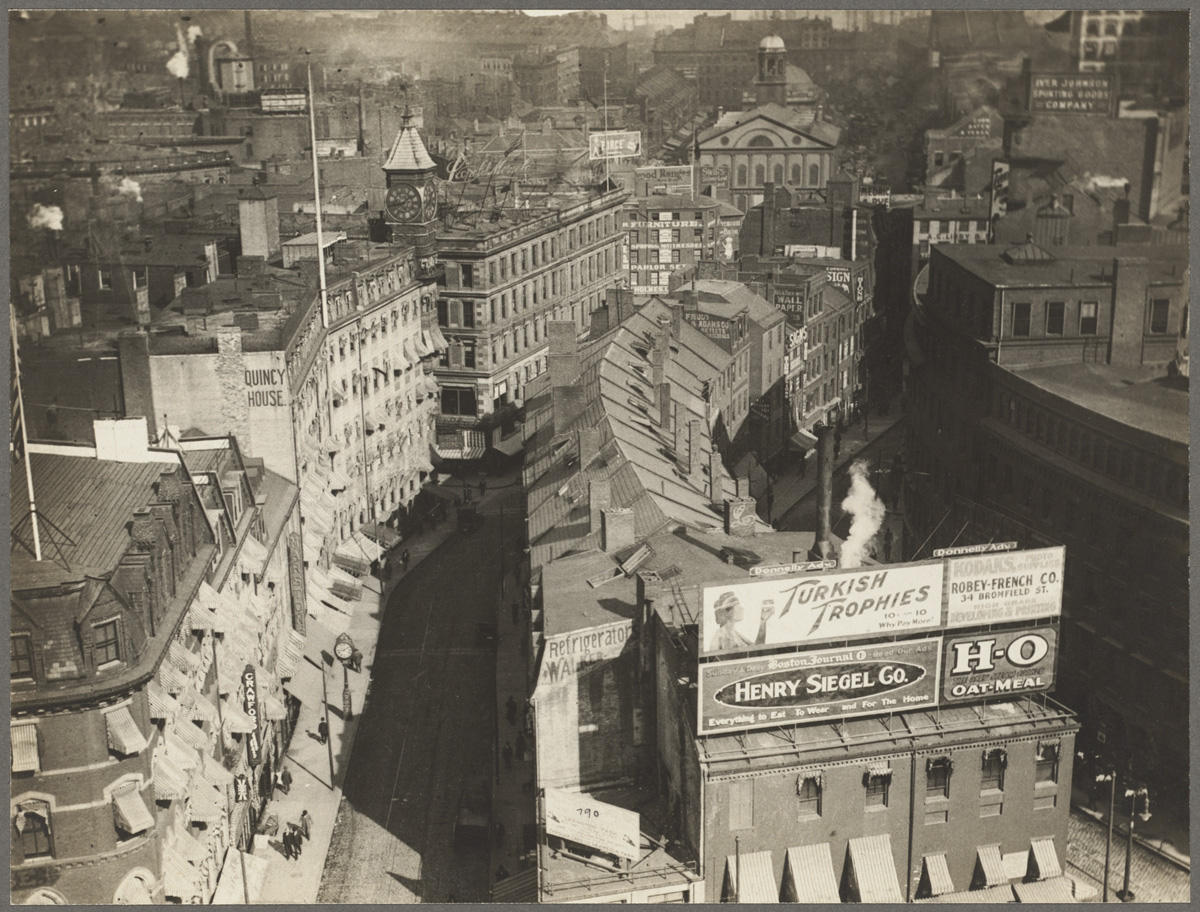
Overview of Brattle St. (left), Cornhill (right), and Faneuil Hall (upper right), c. 1920

== See also ==
- Sears' Crescent building (built 1816) 100 City Hall Plaza; formerly 38–68 Cornhill)
- Sears' Block (built 1848) corner Court + Washington St., formerly 70–72 Cornhill

Previous tenants of Cornhill

- Annin & Smith, 19th-century engravers
- Iver Johnson Sporting Goods Company, located in the Iver Johnson Building, corner of Washington Street and Cornhill
- Daniel Clement Colesworthy, bookseller, c. 1850s
- Frost & Adams, art supplies
- The Liberator, published by Isaac Knapp, Cornhill, c. 1837
- Bela Marsh, 19th-century publisher
- F. T. Somerby, painter
