= Boston City Hall Plaza =

Public space in Boston, Massachusetts

Coordinates: 42°21′37″N 71°03′33″W

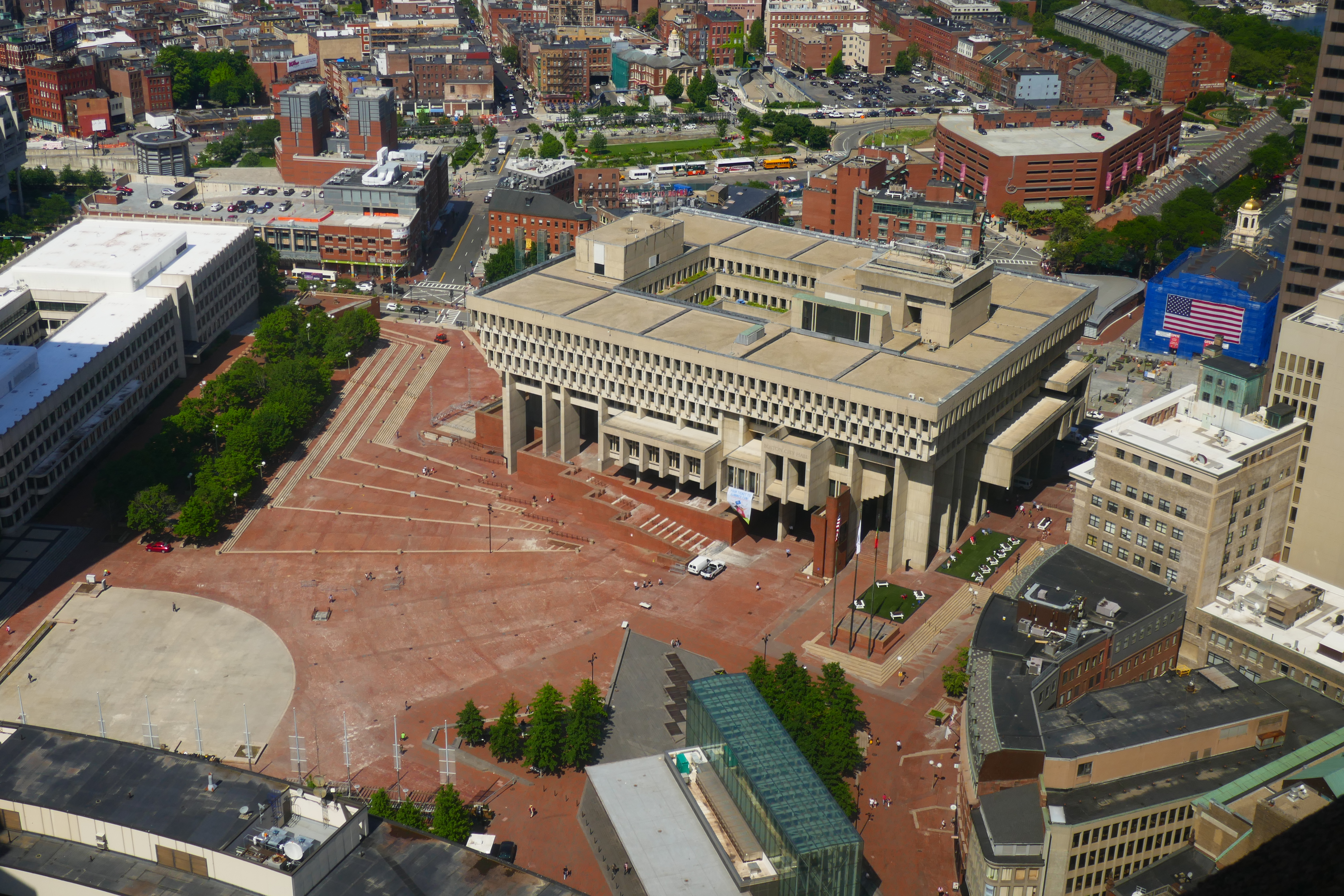
Aerial view of Boston City Hall Plaza, 2019

City Hall Plaza is a public plaza in the Government Center area of Boston, Massachusetts, United States. The architectural firm Kallmann McKinnell & Knowles designed the plaza in 1962 to accompany Boston's new City Hall building. The multi-level, irregularly shaped plaza consists of red brick and concrete. The Government Center MBTA station is located beneath the plaza; its entrance is at the southwest corner of the plaza.

== Description ==
City Hall Plaza spans 8 acres (3.2 ha) at Government Center in Downtown Boston, Massachusetts, United States. It is shaped like a curving trapezoid. The design has been cited as being patterned after the Piazza del Campo in Siena and similarly scaled to Rome's St. Peter's Square and Venice's Piazza San Marco. The plaza slopes down toward the east, with an elevation change of 26 feet (7.9 m) from end to end. The plaza has brick paving, the same material used in the floors of City Hall's third-story plaza lobby. Several tiers of brick terraces radiate from City Hall through the plaza, and patterns in the pavement delineate the stair treads, subtly directing visitors to the building's entrances. The steps were spaced so that they matched up with the elevation of streets that connected with the plaza; this gave the steps an irregular quality. The design was also intended to be level with the height of the John F. Kennedy Federal Building's podium at the plaza's north end. At City Hall's southern boundary, a set of stairs from Congress Street ascends west to plaza level.

There are benches and maple trees at its northern border, and until 2006, a sunken space at the northwestern corner that contained a fountain. The fountain had a quarter-circle arrangement, following the curve of Cambridge Street to the west, and consisted of water walls and steps. There is a plaque commemorating Alexander Graham Bell's invention of the telephone within the plaza, marking the spot where Bell formerly had his laboratory. Much of the plaza originally lacked even basic amenities and consisted of open-air brick terraces, lacking either canopies above or heating systems below. The plaza was controversial after its completion (see Boston City Hall Plaza § Reception) and, in 2022, was overhauled. The work included 12,000 square feet (1,100 m^{2}) of play areas, 11,000 square feet (1,000 m^{2}) of terraces, 3,000 seats, and 100 trees. There is also a glass exhibition pavilion along Congress Street.

A portion of the Tremont Street subway tunnel, formerly used by northbound trains on what is now the Green Line, passes directly under City Hall. This segment of tunnel, containing the Adams Square station, was abandoned in 1963. The ceilings of the subway tunnels are as shallow as 1 foot (0.30 m) beneath the surface of the plaza, and there is also a parking garage underneath. The underground infrastructure restricted the extent to which the plaza could be excavated, as well as what could be placed there. For example, the former fountain was installed specifically to avoid the tunnels, and trees could not be planted throughout most of the plaza.

=== Nearby structures ===
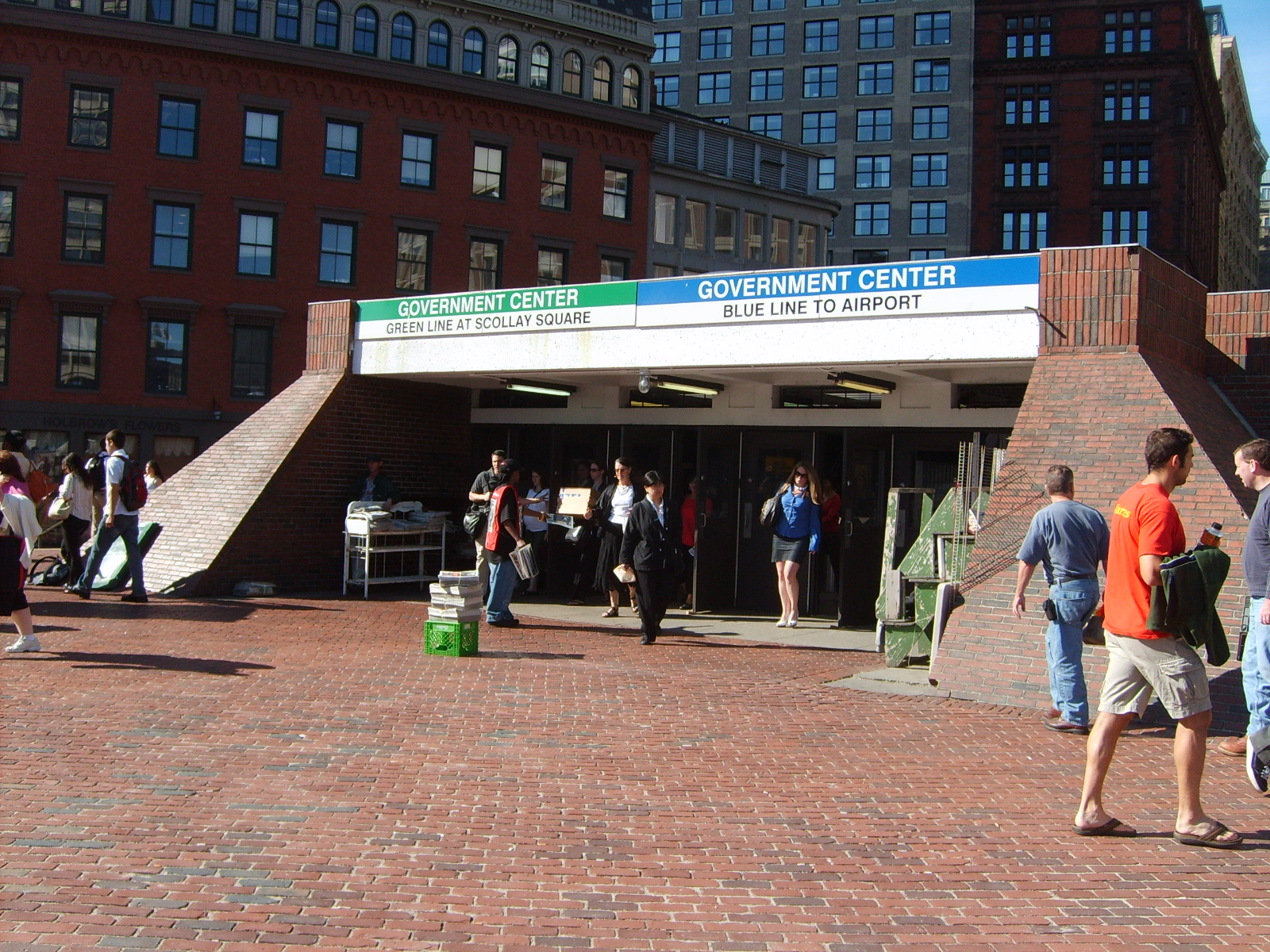
The low brick mound (seen here in 2007 before replacement) that led to the Government Center station

City Hall Plaza has a headhouse entrance to the Government Center station, served by the MBTA subway's Blue and Green lines. The entrance was originally housed within a brick mound, replaced with a glass pavilion in the 2010s.

City Hall Plaza is surrounded by several of Government Center's buildings. Boston City Hall, a Brutalist building designed for the city government, is located on the eastern side of the plaza. The JFK Federal Building is on the northern side. The Center Plaza building is across Cambridge Street to the west. The Sears' Crescent and Sears' Block, a group of historic literary buildings along the former route of a street named Cornhill, are on the southern edge of the plaza. The Sears buildings are commercial structures dating from the 19th century, designed in the trabeated style common at the time. John Morris Dixon wrote that the Sears buildings had been saved at the behest of I. M. Pei—who had designed the Government Center master plan—because of his desire to not "alienate" the plaza from the rest of the city. Both the Sears buildings and Center Plaza have concave curves that face City Hall Plaza.

== History ==
=== Development ===
The plaza under construction in 1963

In the 1950s, Mayor John Hynes devised plans to redevelop Scollay Square, which the city perceived as rundown. As part of the Government Center project, Hynes suggested replacing Scollay Square with city, state, and federal government buildings. At the recommendation of Edward Logue, administrator of the Boston Redevelopment Authority (BRA) under Hynes's successor John F. Collins, the city hired I. M. Pei to design a master plan for the area. Pei's proposal entailed replacing most of the site with a series of governmental buildings around the new City Hall. His firm proposed that the plaza include lawns, with pathways cut through them. As part of a design competition for City Hall that commenced in 1961, competitors were required to design a plaza surrounding the building. In May 1962, Kallmann McKinnell & Knowles, in conjunction with associate architects Campbell & Aldrich and structural engineering firm LeMessurier Associates, won the competition. The design, which called for a brick expanse surrounding City Hall, was likened to Piazza del Campo in Siena, Italy.

Shortly after the City Hall design was announced, the Metropolitan Transit Authority (MTA; now the MBTA) proposed constructing a 60-by-40-foot (18 by 12 m) entrance kiosk to the Government Center station. The federal government, which had acquired the site of City Hall and its plaza, agreed to hand it over to the city in August 1963. Although City Hall began construction that September, the overall Government Center plan was not approved for another year. The BRA approved plans in May 1965 for City Hall Plaza, which at the time was planned to cost $4.5 million. Work on the plaza itself began in August 1967. The plaza and City Hall mostly replaced Scollay Square. Numerous streets were removed, including Brattle Street and Cornhill, although the Sears' Crescent and Sears' Block on Cornhill were preserved, since there was substantial opposition to their demolition. The city considered allocating a small section of the plaza as an outdoor dining area, to be used by tenants in the Sears buildings.

In July 1968, BRA director Hale Champion recommended that the city government acquire an artwork by David Smith, for the plaza. The BRA agreed to buy the sculpture that October for $50,000; known as Cubi XXV, it measured 10 feet (3.0 m) and was made of stainless steel. When the Boston City Council heard of the sculpture, councillors predominantly opposed it, so the city never ended up buying Cubi XXV. A fountain was built at the northwest corner of the plaza as part of the original design, utilizing water from City Hall's water supply system. Within days of its dedication in September 1969, the fountain elicited complaints that it was circulating dirty water.

=== 1970s to 1990s ===
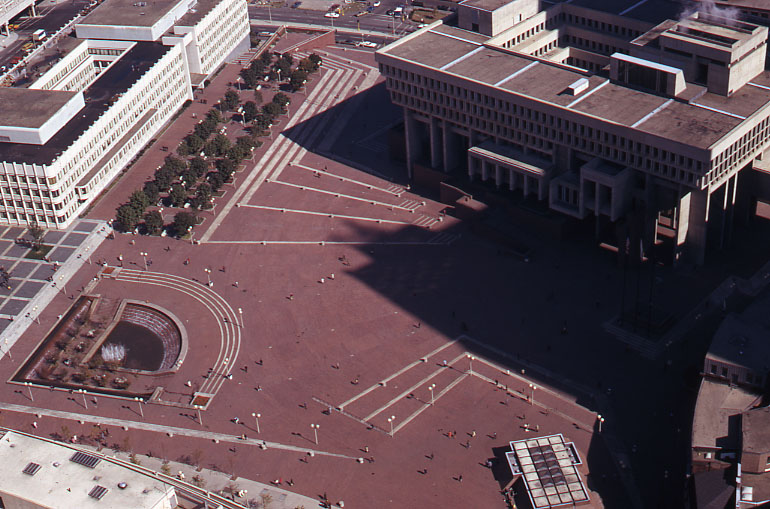
City Hall Plaza in 1973

Ideas for improvements were put forth almost from the plaza's opening. The original plan included a 350-foot-wide (110 m) footbridge from City Hall Plaza to Dock Square, which was narrowed to 50 feet (15 m) wide. It was then canceled altogether by Mayor Kevin White in 1976 because of a lack of funding. The plaza's fountain was shut down in 1977 because water was leaking into the Blue Line subway tunnel below. The deactivation of the fountain, one of the few places that cooled visitors down during the summer, prompted street vendors to scatter.

In the late 1980s, members of the public suggested renaming City Hall Plaza after the old Scollay Square, saying the old square was still well-known over two decades after its demolition. The city government proposed redesigning the plaza in the 1980s, and the Boston Business Journal requested public proposals for redesigning the plaza, which Progressive Architecture called "vast and unfriendly". The BRA created drawings for a prospective renovation of City Hall Plaza in 1988. The renovation would have included a new fountain designed by Christopher Janney and Joan Brigham, which would emit steam and produce sound. The architect Graham Gund also proposed constructing a footbridge spanning Congress Street, connecting City Hall Plaza and 60 State Street. Ultimately, the renovations were not carried out due to insufficient funding. Following requests from Massachusetts farmers, the city government allowed them to set up a farmers' market at City Hall Plaza from 1988 onward. By the end of the decade, the plaza was leaking, and the northern edge had settled downward, requiring the construction of a makeshift wooden staircase connecting to the JFK Federal Building.

Mayor Thomas Menino launched a design competition for the plaza in 1994, ultimately receiving 190 proposals. At the time, he characterized the plaza as "a vast wasteland" that failed to attract visitors. The winning entries included an art exhibit, an abolitionist museum, a ballpark, and a "video village". The next year, Menino cofounded the Trust for City Hall Plaza, a public–private partnership with developer Norman B. Leventhal. The trust discussed plans over several months in 1995, focusing particularly on the plaza's northern portion (the former site of Cornhill), which was especially underutilized. The trust ultimately proposed constructing a hotel on the plaza, eliciting public criticism and spurring objections from the General Services Administration, which owned the JFK Building. The hotel plan was canceled in 1999 when Menino announced a $27.5 million renovation of the plaza itself. The latter plan included renovating the Government Center station entrance, adding a park in front of the JFK Building, and a colonnaded arcade on the Cambridge Street side.

=== 2000s and early 2010s ===
The arcade along Cambridge Street was completed in 2001, but the Trust for City Hall Plaza was subsequently disbanded. In the early 2000s, cellist Yo-Yo Ma proposed the construction of a music garden designed by Julie Moir Messervy, based on his Inspired by Bach series of recordings. The plan did not move forward in Boston, but was realized as the Toronto Music Garden. The northwest corner fountain was covered over with a concrete slab in 2006. The next year, Emerson College students used the virtual world Second Life to re-imagine a better design. The project was sponsored by the BRA, among others.

A nonprofit group built a "Cancer Garden of Hope" at the northeast corner of the plaza in 2010. That year, the United States Environmental Protection Agency (EPA) announced that it would provide recommendations to make City Hall Plaza more energy-efficient as part of its Greening America’s Capitals program. The EPA's recommendations for the "greening" of the plaza were published in 2011. The Boston Society of Architects solicited proposals for the plaza's renovation as part of its 2011 Rotch design contest, and work on plans to redesign the plaza and the Government Center station commenced that year. A 2014 study by three landscape architecture students at West Virginia University proposed a complete redesign of the plaza.

=== 2010s to present: Redesign ===
In 2015, the city launched a crowdsourcing project entitled "Re-invent City Hall Plaza," asking the public for suggestions to improve the plaza. Later in the year, the city made a number of changes to the plaza, including installing artificial grass, picnic tables, and lawn chairs, to make the space more inviting. The Project for Public Spaces claimed "these efforts to put what the New York Times has called a 'kelly green band-aid' on this gaping wound in the heart of the city, are insufficient," and that a more comprehensive redesign was needed. The city also hired Sasaki Associates and Shawmut to create a 30-year master plan for the plaza.

A 2016 plan for a Ferris wheel and other improvements to the plaza did not move forward. The new MBTA station opened in March 2016 after two years of construction. Extensive landscaping and accessibility improvements to the adjacent areas of the plaza were completed in 2017. A year-long study was completed in 2017 by architecture firms Utile and Reed Hilderbrand. The final report called for major changes in City Hall and the plaza. "The Patios", a seasonal beer garden, opened in 2018 on a terrace overlooking Congress Street, and was expanded for 2019.

The city government announced plans in 2018 to spend $60 million renovating the plaza. In June 2019, the city announced that renovation would begin shortly. The city government said the plaza would include "a civic space for all residents" that would be accessible and environmentally sustainable, with upgraded infrastructure. The plans were developed by Sasaki Associates. Construction began in 2020 and involved removing and replacing large sections of the brick, replacing them with trees, benches, and other amenities. The presence of the subway tunnels under the plaza delayed the reconstruction, as did the COVID-19 pandemic and the use of specialized materials. The first phase of the renovation, covering its northern portion, opened in November 2022. Programming in the renovated plaza was initially funded by a $1.5 million federal grant intended to help with recovery from the COVID-19 pandemic. The Boston Preservation Alliance awarded the project its 2025 Preservation Award.

== Public events ==
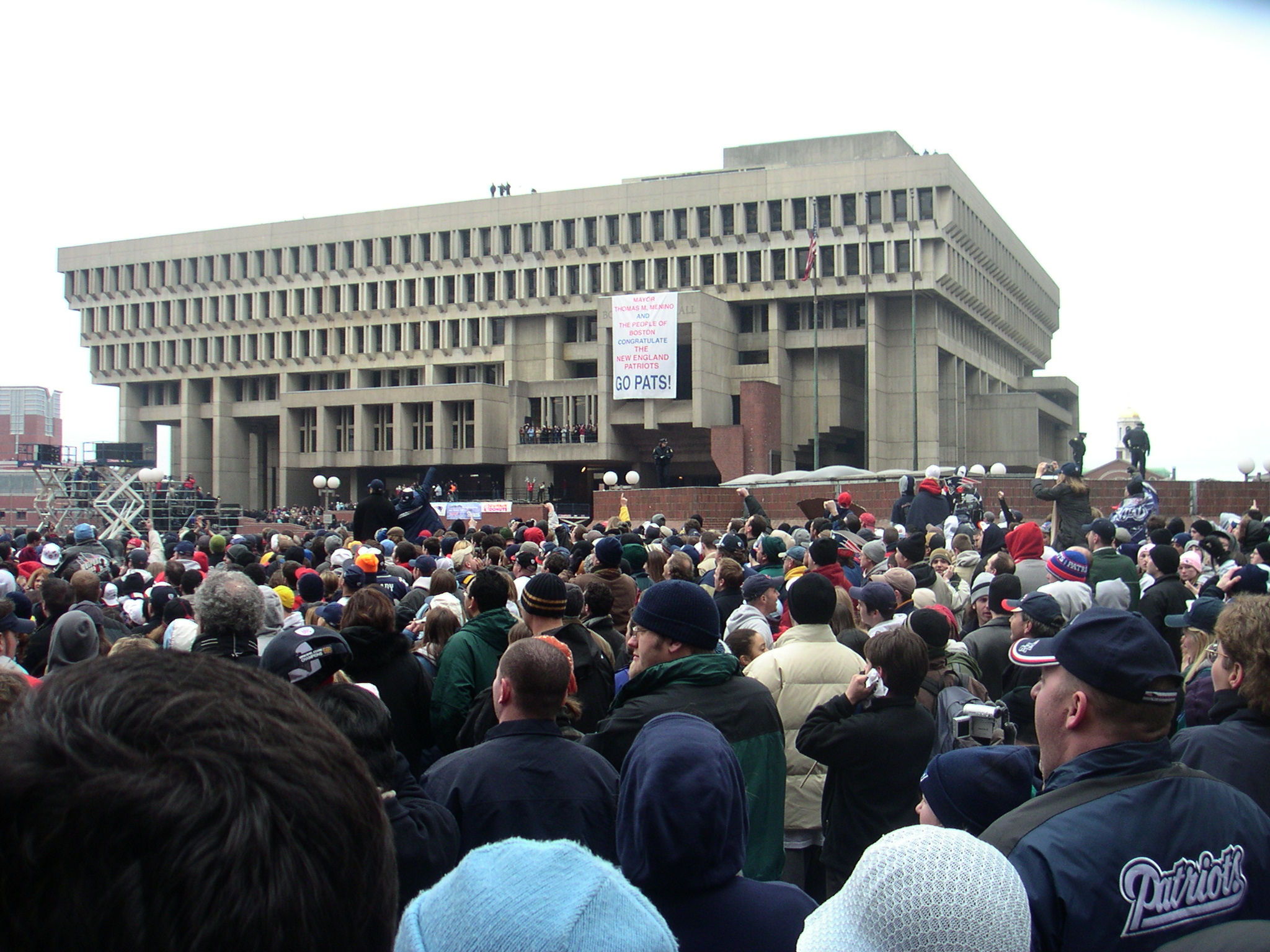
2004 rally to celebrate New England Patriots victory in Super Bowl XXXVIII

Nearby Boston Common has long been used for public events, including a 1969 peace rally that drew an estimated crowd of 100,000 and the 1979 mass celebrated by Pope John Paul II. But damage to the park from such large events led city officials to limit future events on the Common, relocating many to the paved City Hall Plaza.

Annual events held on City Hall Plaza include Boston Calling Music Festival (2013–2016), Big Apple Circus, The Jimmy Fund Scooper Bowl, the Boston Pride Festival, the African Festival of Boston, Boston GreenFest, Boston Techjam, the Puerto Rican Festival of Massachusetts, the finish line of Hub on Wheels, and the Boston Cycling Celebration.

Occasional events on the plaza have included Boston's 350th birthday celebration, art exhibits such as Strandbeest; large rallies in honor of the New England Patriots, the Boston Red Sox, and the Boston Bruins; political demonstrations; an exhibit of "street pianos"; beer festivals; HUBweek, a pizza festival, the Boston Night Market, a "Roller Disco Tribute Party", and the display of a 25-foot-tall statue of King Tut.

The Plaza has also been the site for many free concerts including being the original site (before moving to the Hatch Memorial Shell) for WODS (Oldies 103.3) summer concert series such as Chubby Checker and Paul Revere & the Raiders.

From December 2016 to February 2017, the Plaza opened an outdoor Skating Path and Holiday Market, as part of an installation called "Boston Winter". The skating path provided skating lessons for different age groups and planned themed skating events. Boston Winter continued during the holiday season of 2017–2018, but did not return for 2018–2019 as the city prepared for a major renovation of the plaza.

The newly renovated playground on the plaza went viral online in 2023 as part of the "cop slide" internet meme after a police officer was recorded tumbling down the slide at speed and sustaining a minor head injury. Its virality caused an increase in adult visitors to the playground and age restrictions were enforced at the slide.

== Reception ==
=== Contemporary ===
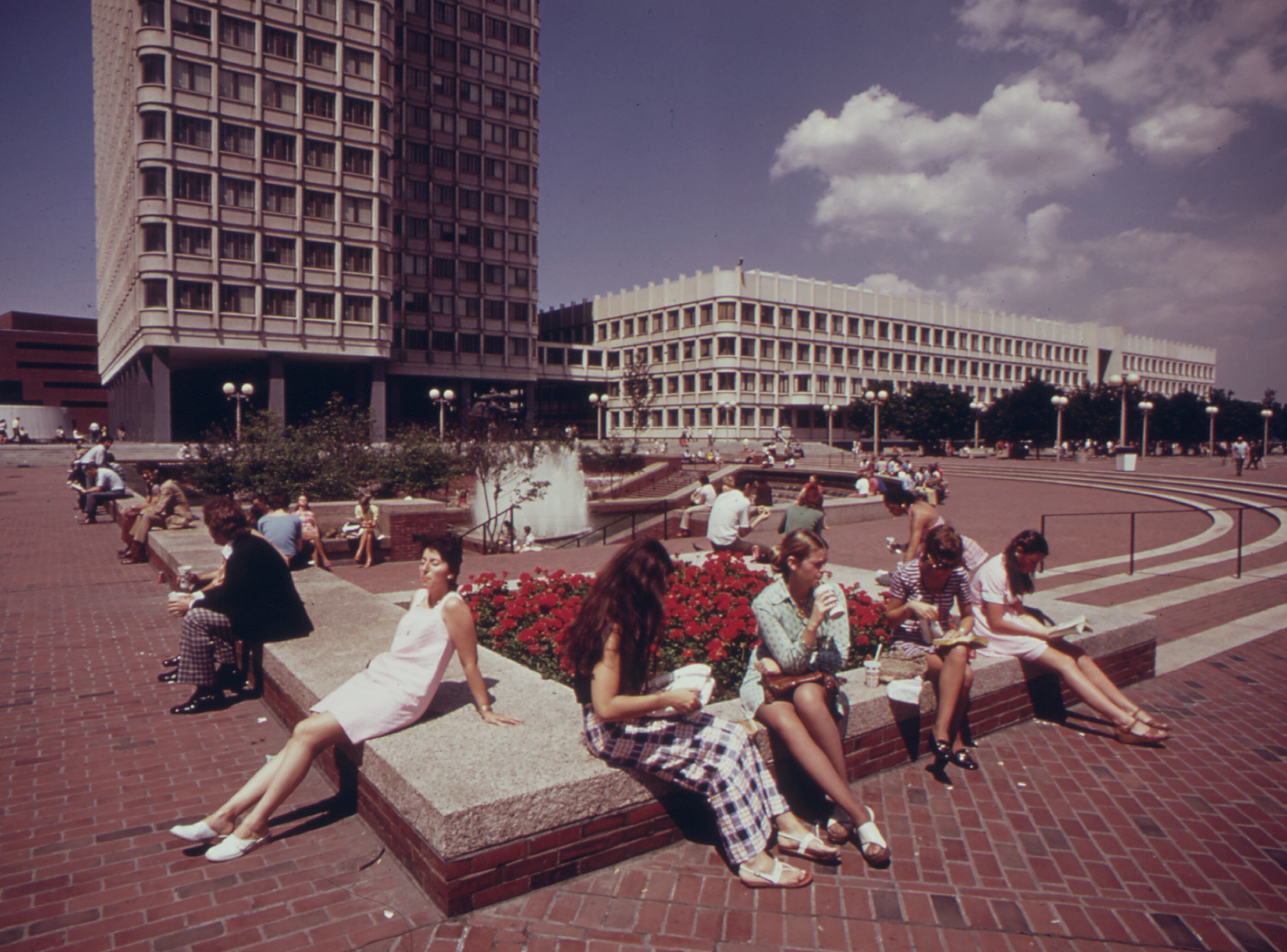
People sitting at the original fountain in 1973

Reaction to the plaza has been mixed. During the building's construction, the Boston Globe predicted that the plaza would be "an inviting, restful spot in the midst of the busy pace of the city", citing the planned benches, trees, and fountains. Architecture critic Ada Louise Huxtable called the plaza "one of the best urban spaces of the 20th century. ... With the plaza, and specifically because of it, the Boston Government Center can now take its place among the world's great city spaces." Early commentary focused on City Hall Plaza's stature as one of the few large hardscapes in the United States. In 1967, Wolf Von Eckardt of The Washington Post praised the city for not having constructed a park, "of which Boston has plenty". John Morris Dixon wrote that "there has never been anything else in the United States like" City Hall Plaza. Dixon cited the hardscape as including "the favorite urban design ideas of the '50s and '60s", including arcades, a fountain, and stairs.

Conversely, a writer for Fusion magazine said in 1969 that the plaza exhibited "no signs of life", such as flowers or trees, and that the subway entrance posed "a clumsy brick megaron". James Marston Fitch, in 1970, said the plaza would become "a no-man's land, impossible to dawdle in, a torment to cross" during any precipitation and that the lighting was too dark for the plaza to be usable at night. The Christian Science Monitor wrote that the plaza was unwelcoming during the winter but that, in the summer, it "acts like your own backyard".

=== Retrospective ===
The Cultural Landscape Foundation listed the plaza as one of its "Marvels of Modernism". Critics of City Hall Plaza repudiated it for its anti-social aesthetic and failure to address unpleasant weather effects, such as heat, cold, wind, and precipitation. The Project for Public Spaces ranked it at the top of the organization's list of "Squares Most Dramatically in Need of Improvement in the United States" in 2005, and has placed the plaza on its "Hall of Shame". The magazine Fast Company wrote in 2011 that the plaza "has utterly no redeeming social value" except when it was used for civic celebrations.

== Image gallery ==
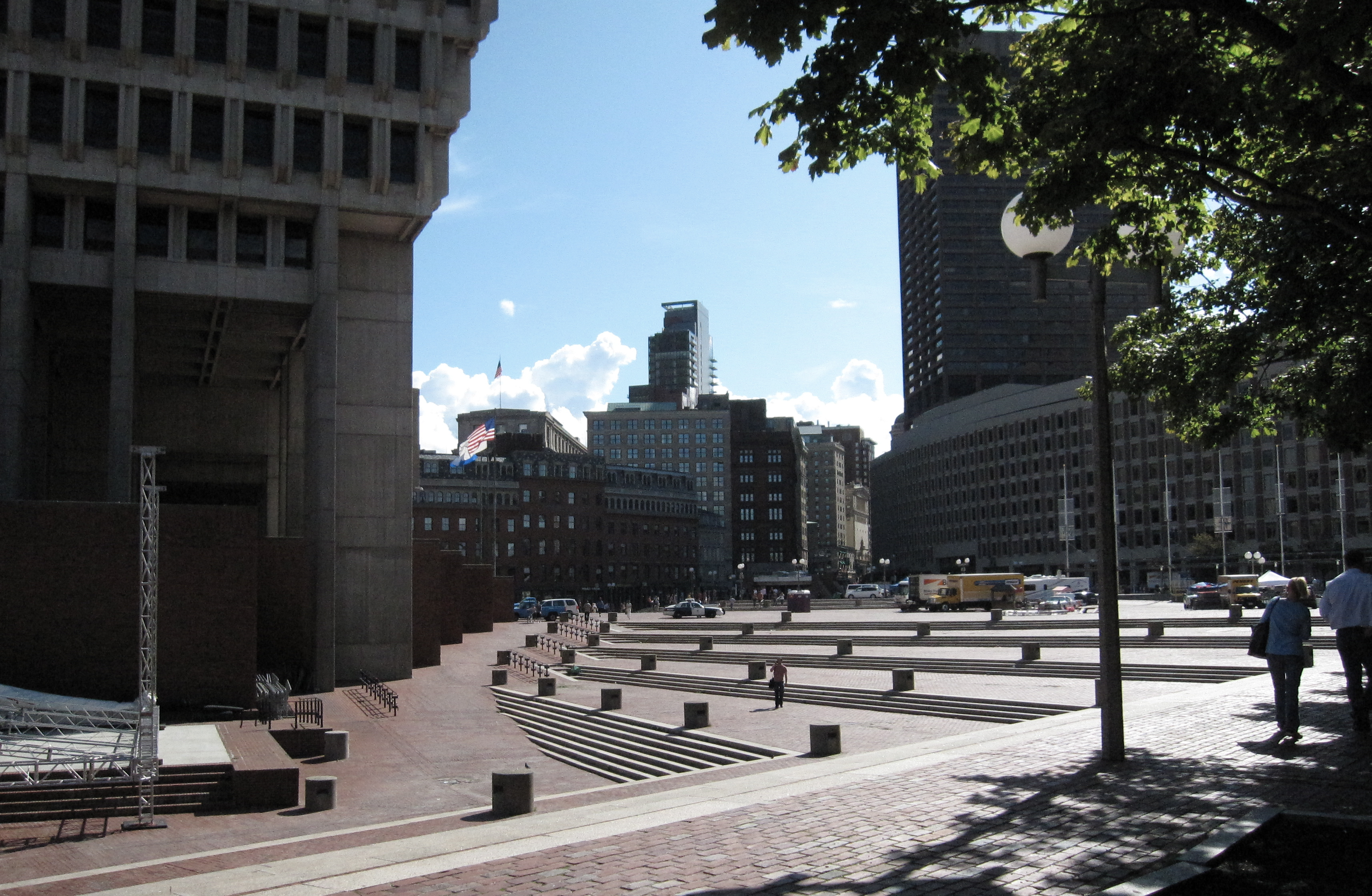
2009

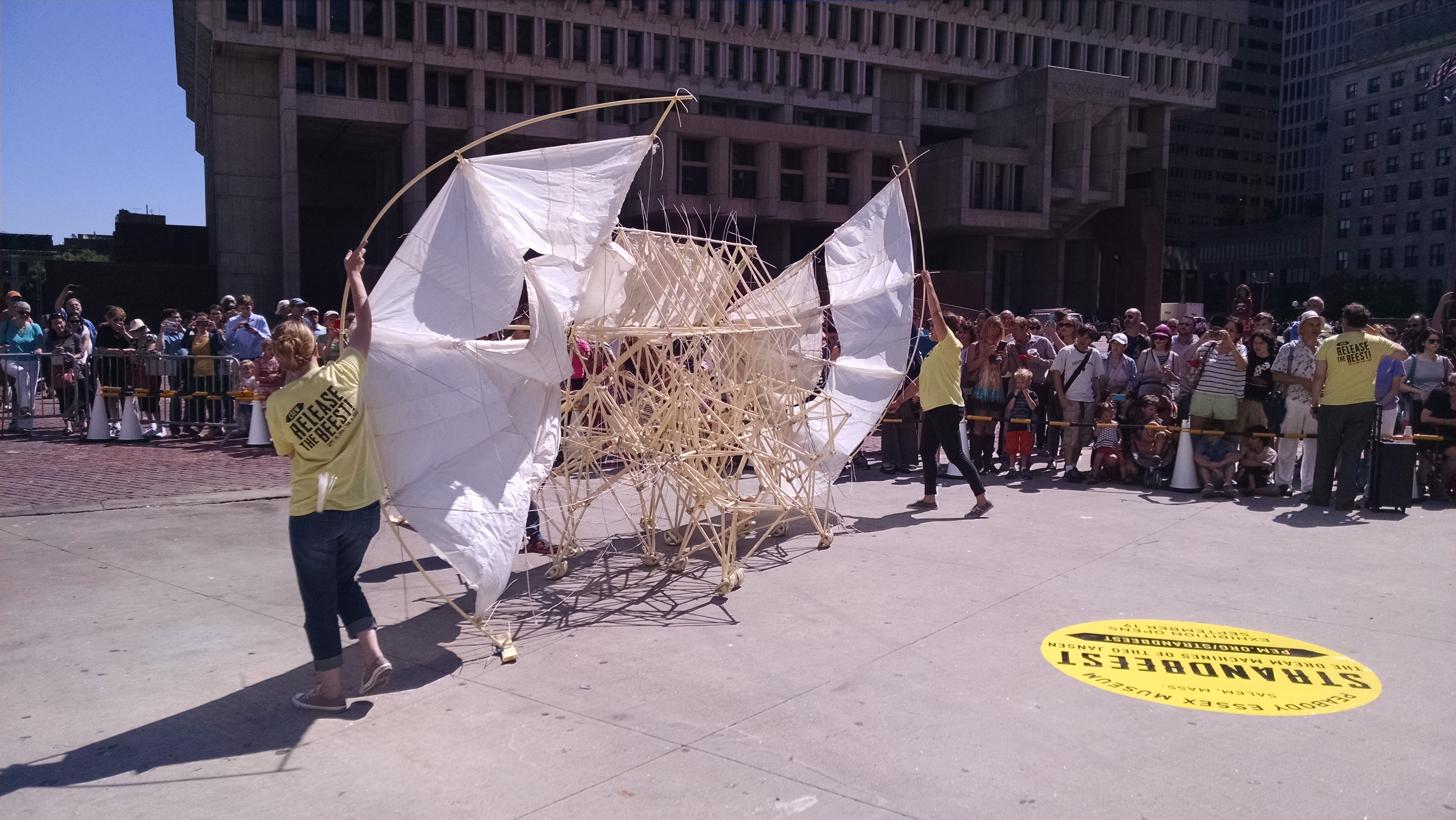
Strandbeest by Theo Jansen, 2015

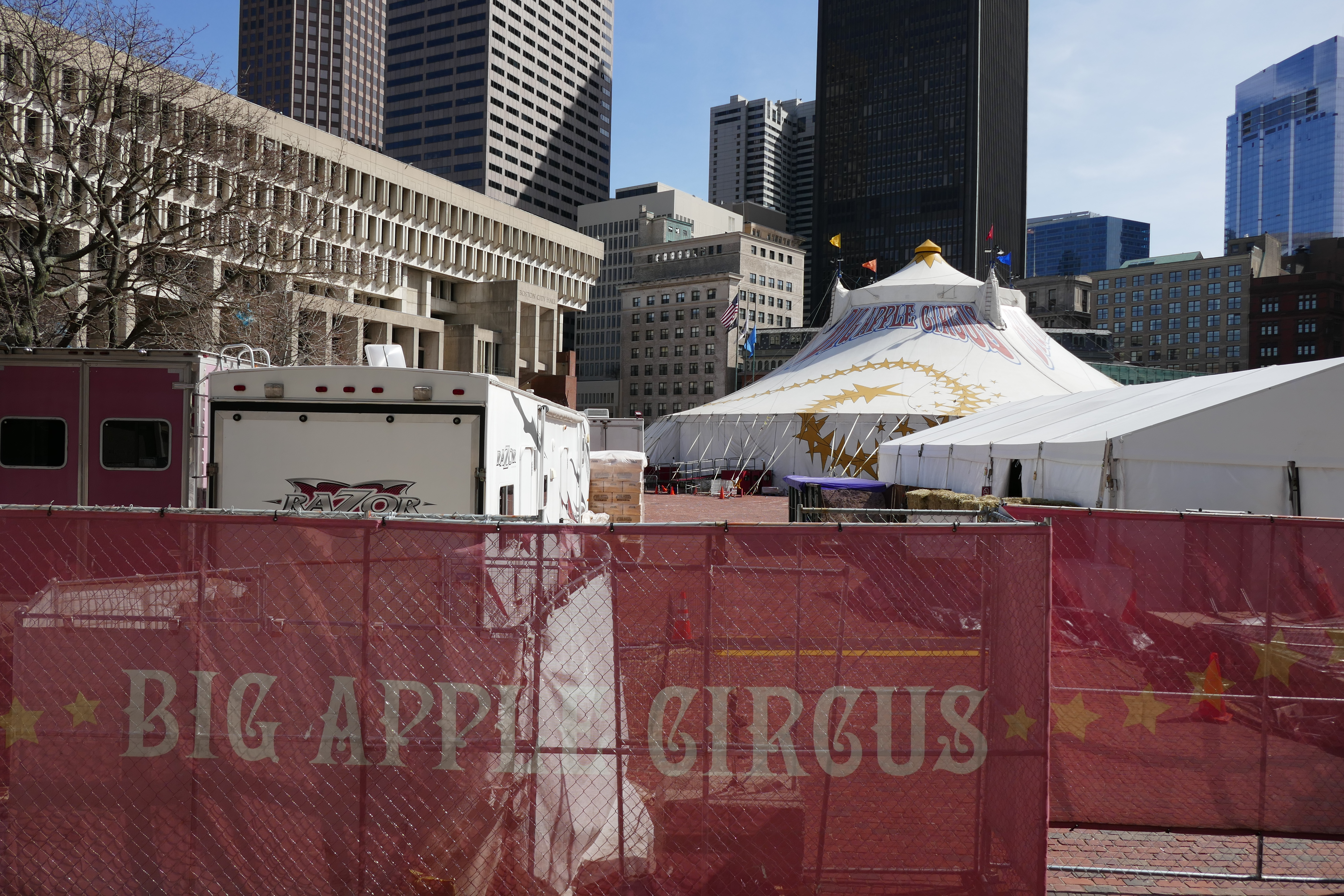
Big Apple Circus, 2016

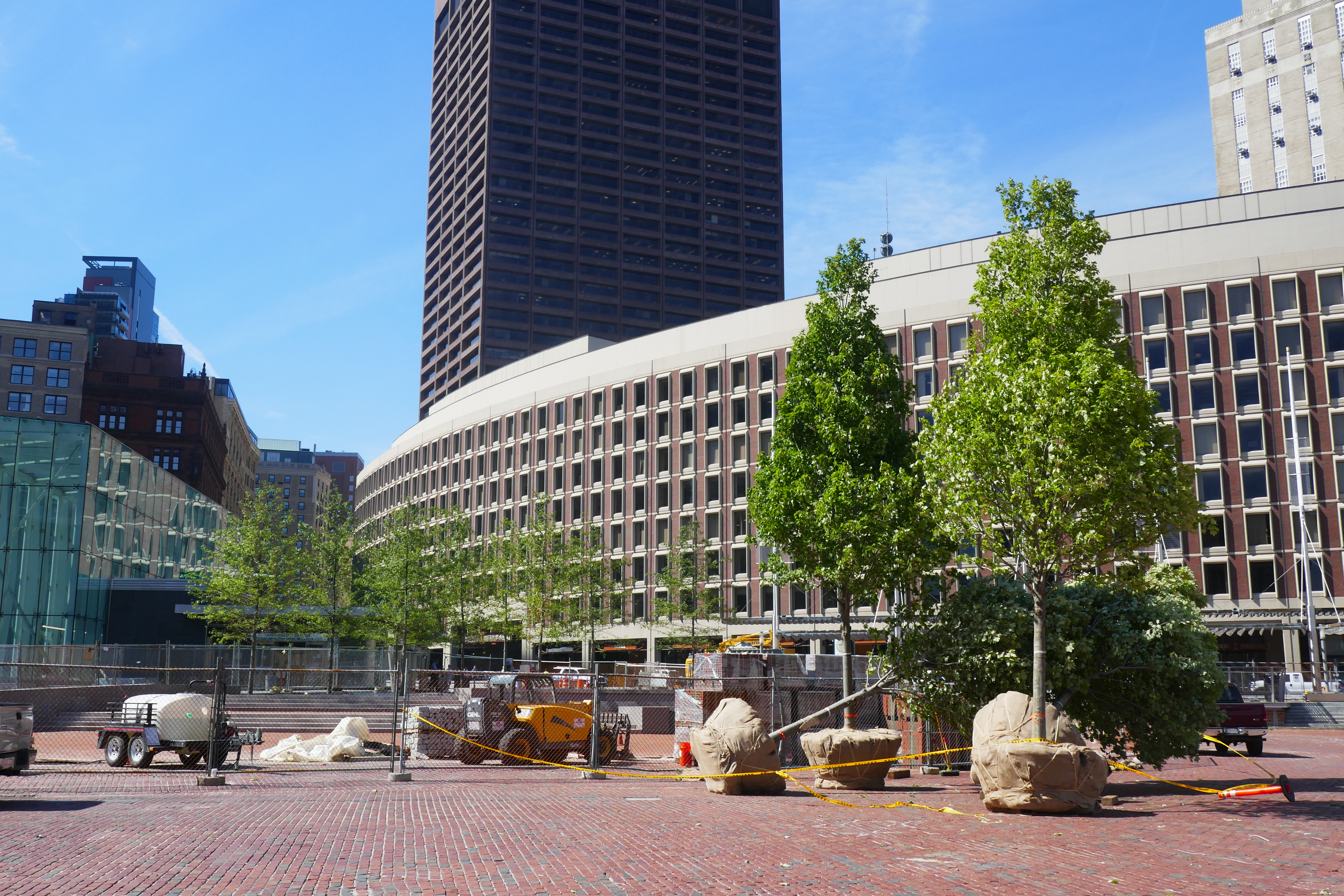
Trees planted in 2016 during reconstruction of the MBTA station

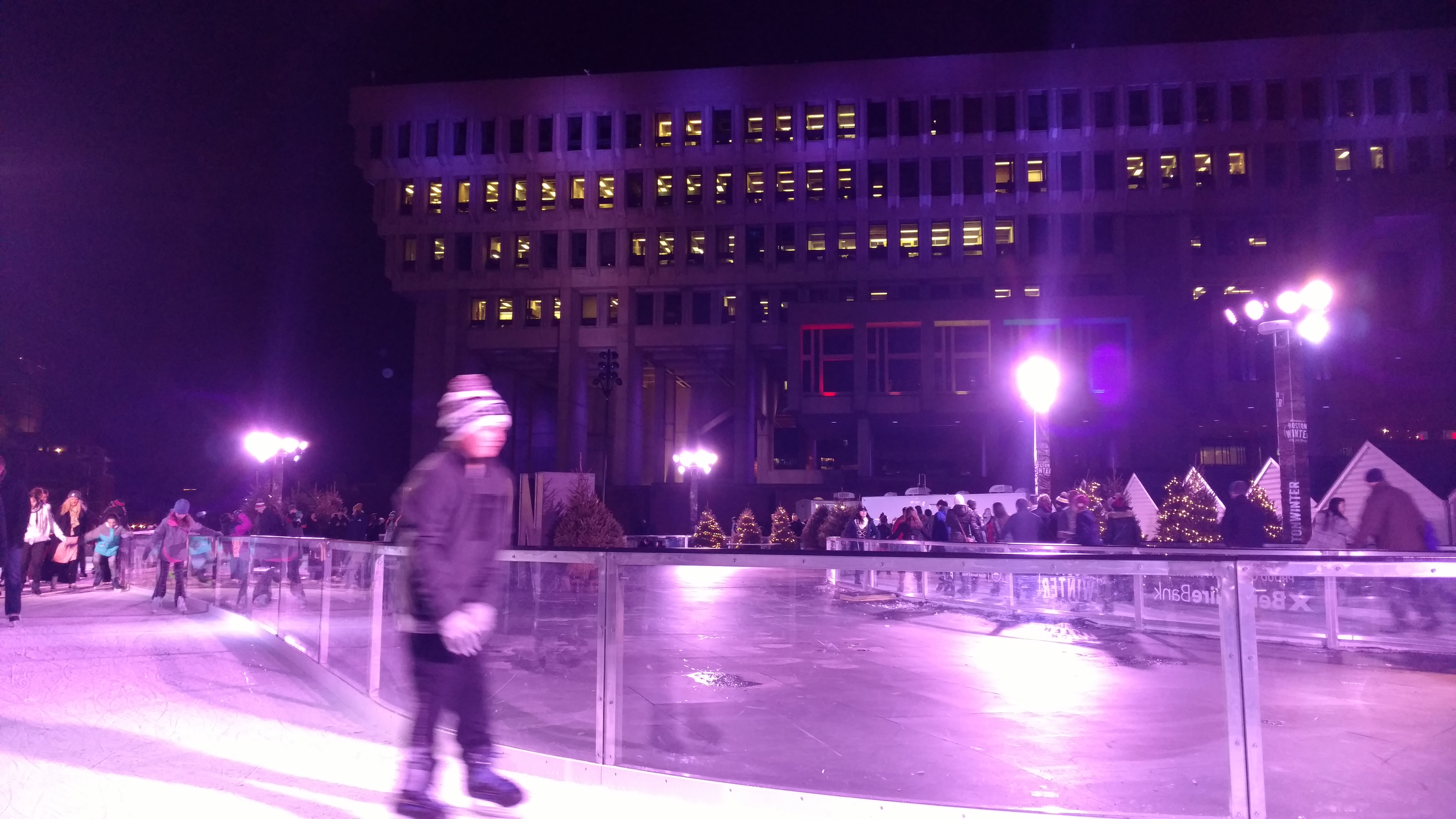
Skating track installed as part of Boston Winter, 2016

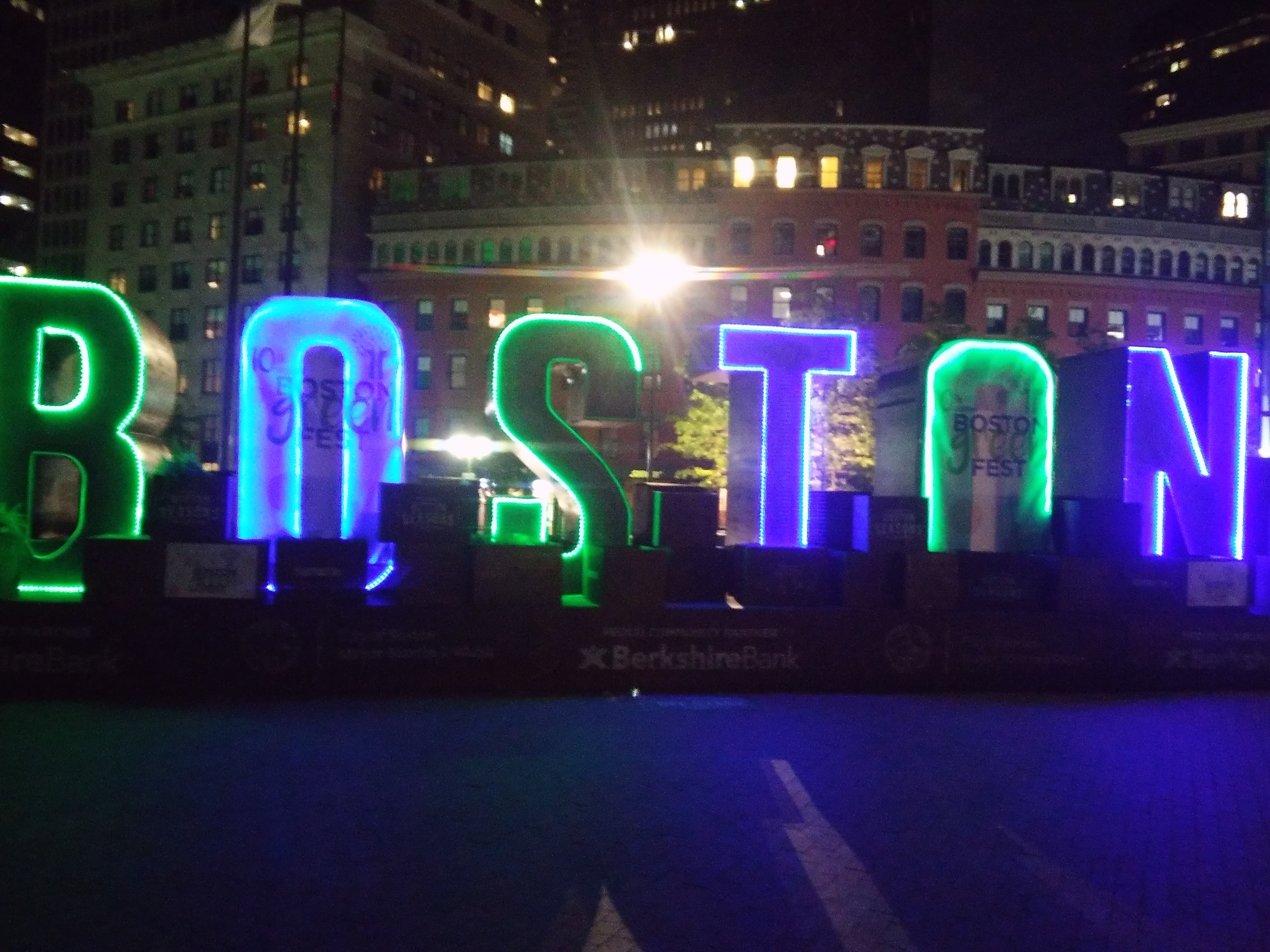
Boston City Hall Plaza lit up in Blue and Green for 10th Annual Boston GreenFest

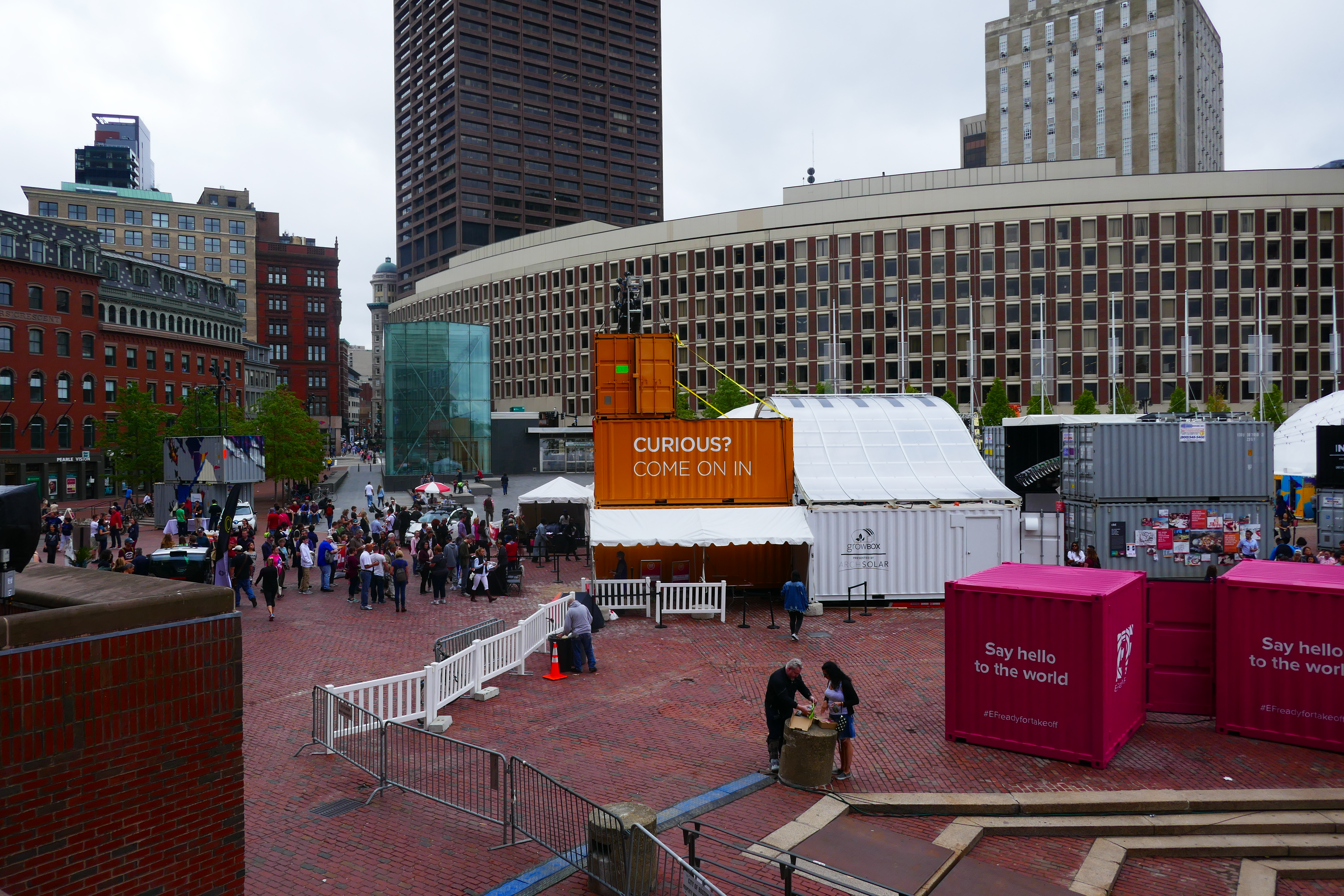
HubWeek, 2017

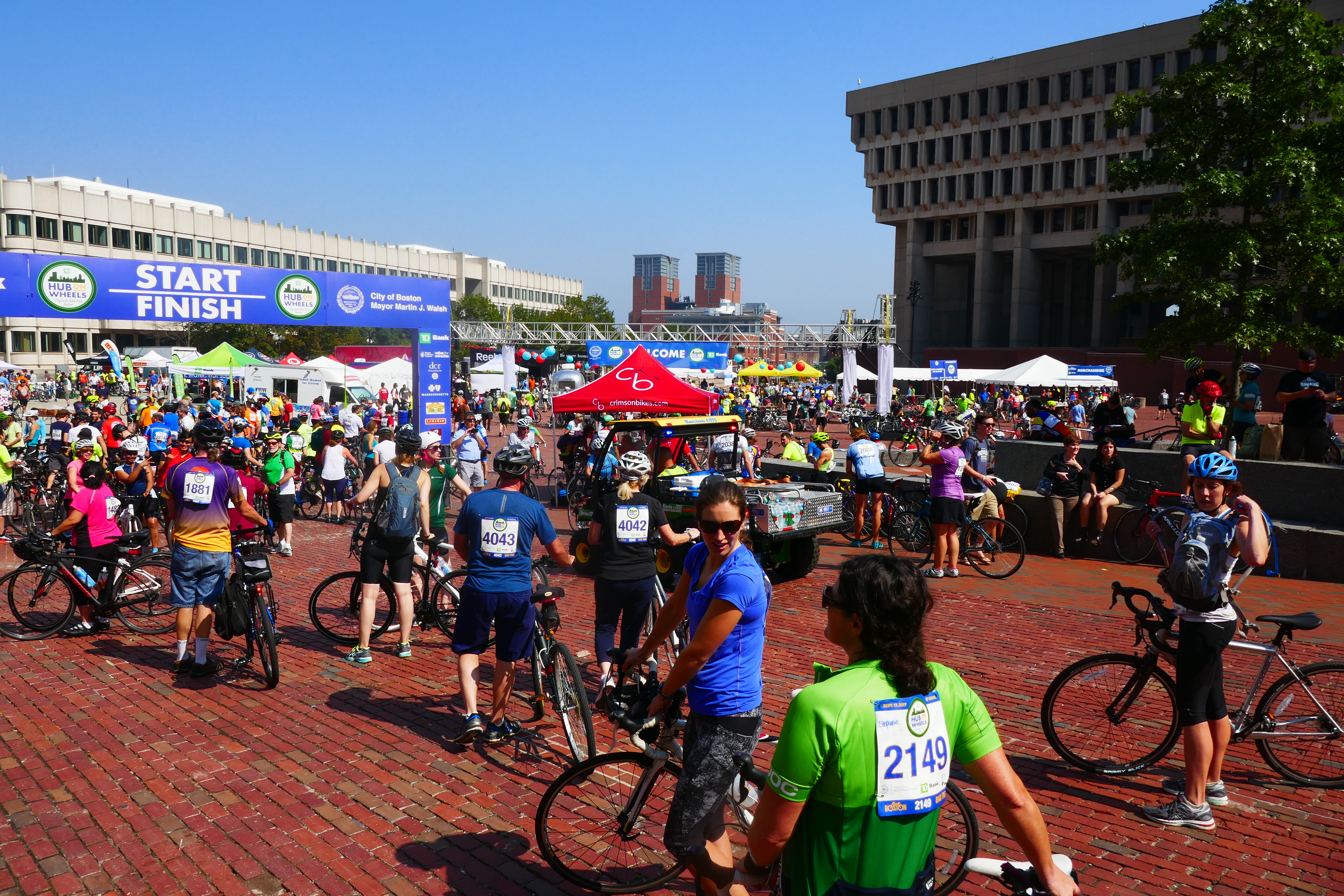
Hub on Wheels bicycle tour finish line, 2017

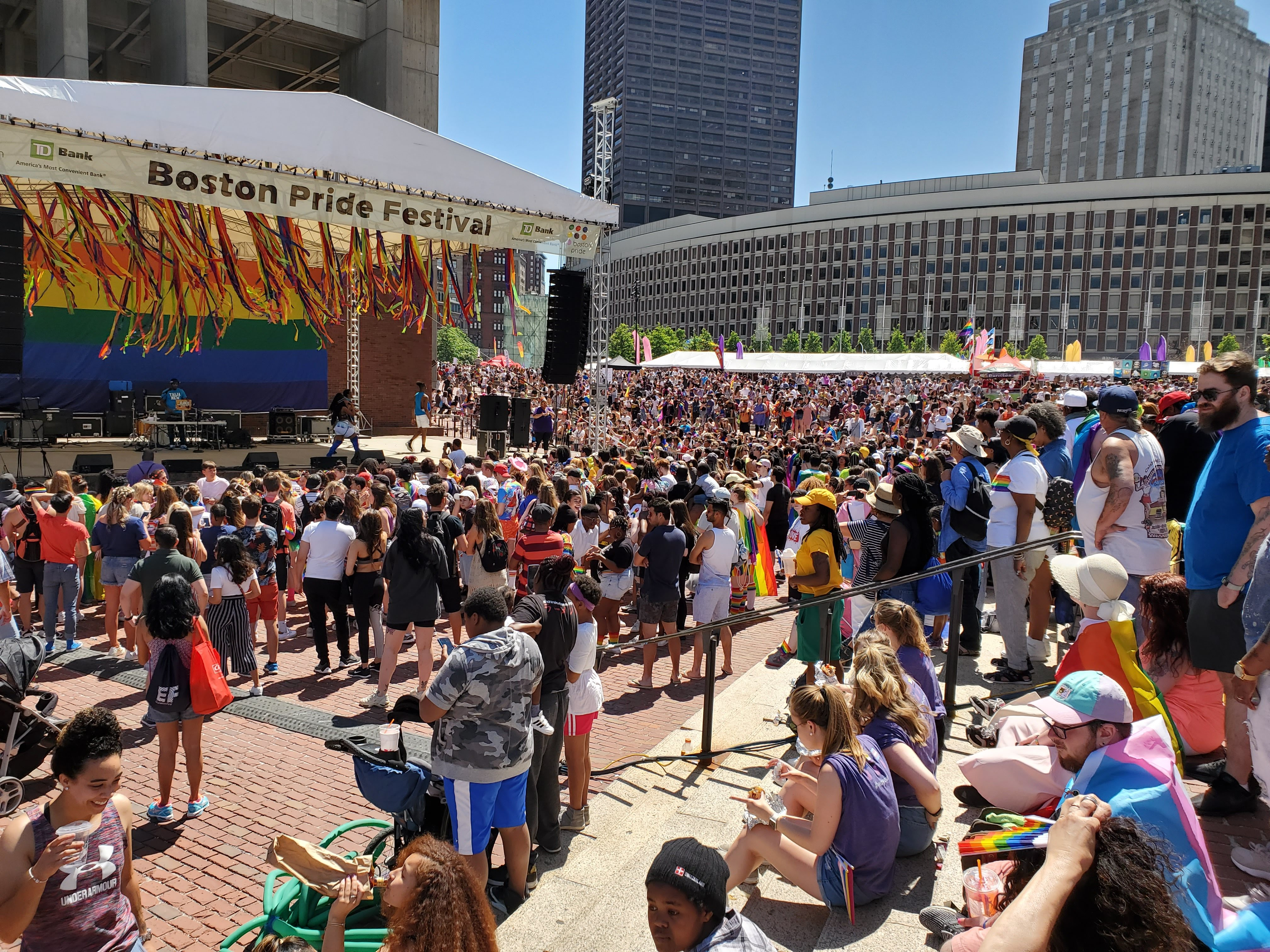
Boston Pride Festival, 2019

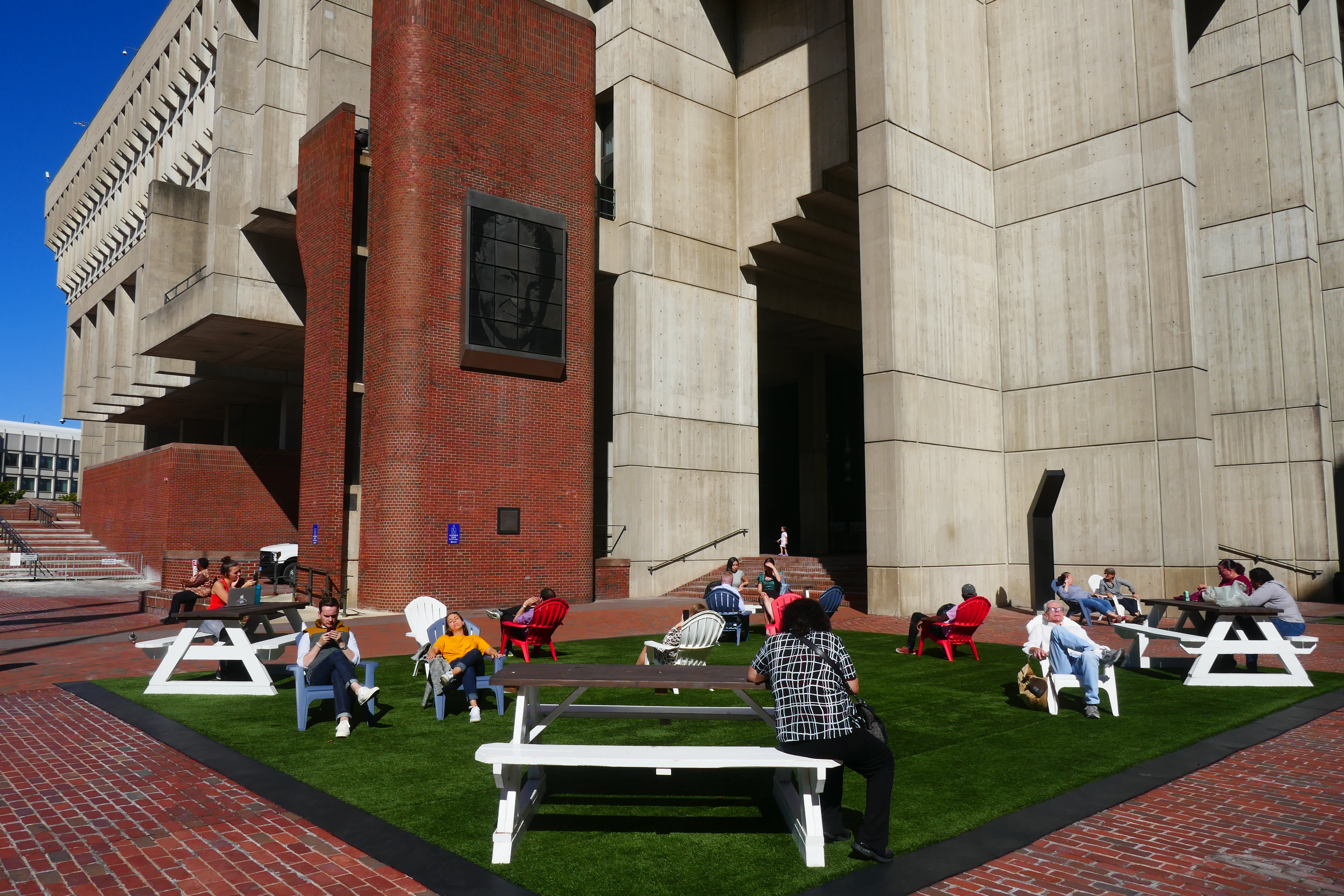
Chairs and tables on the plaza, 2019

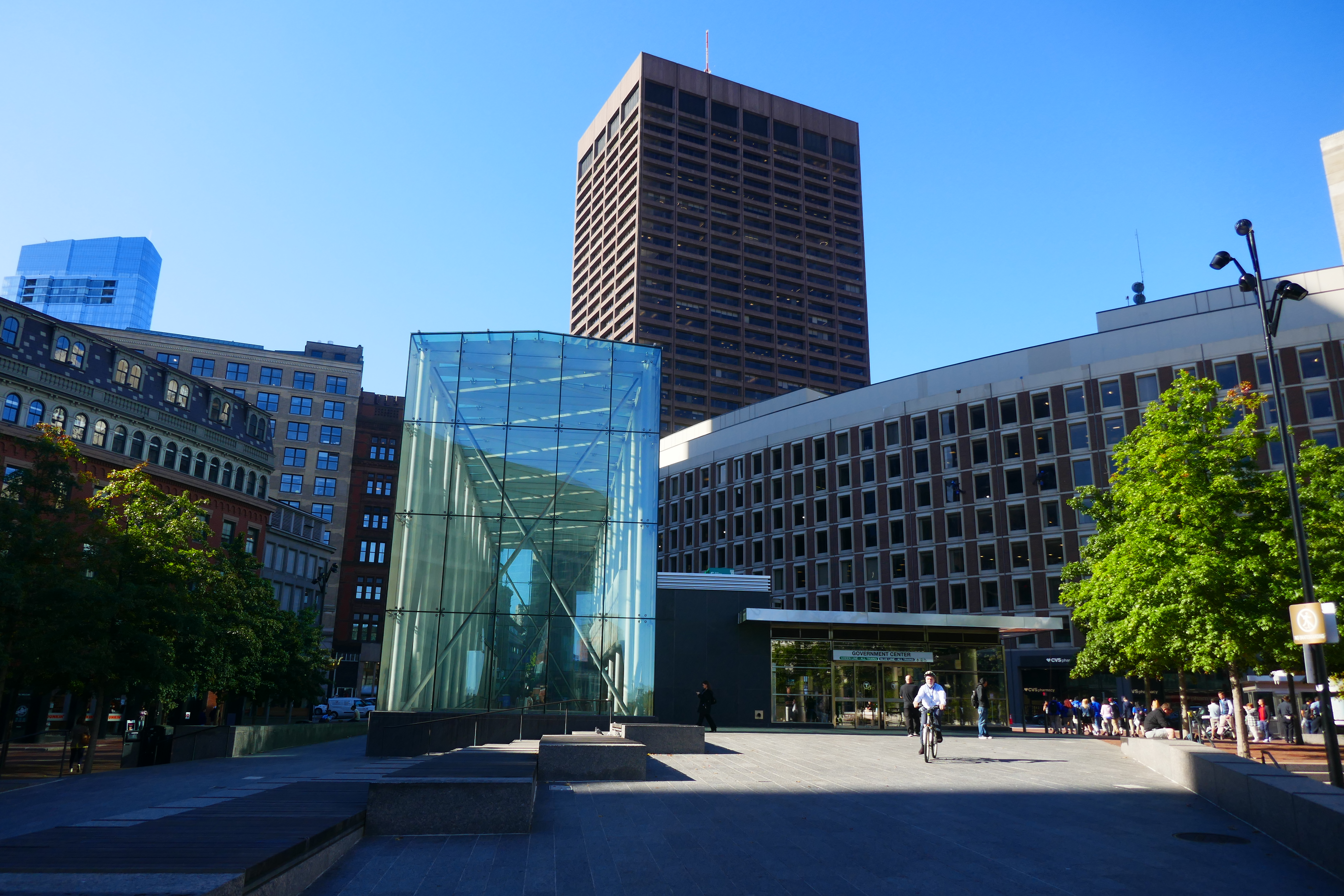
MBTA station and Center Plaza, 2019

== Sources ==
- Boston City Hall Conservation Management Plan (PDF) (Report). Building Conservation Associates. January 2021.
- Dixon, John Morris (June 1970). "Boston's Open Center" (PDF). Architectural Forum. Vol. 132, no. 5.
- Moholy-Nagy, Sibyl (January–February 1969). "Boston's City Hall: It binds the past to the future" (PDF). Architectural Forum. Vol. 130, no. 1.
- Monteyne, David (2011). "Boston City Hall and a History of Reception". Journal of Architectural Education. 65 (1). Taylor & Francis, Ltd.: 45–62. ISSN 1046-4883. JSTOR 41319218.
- O'Connor, Thomas H. (1993). Building a New Boston: Politics and Urban Renewal, 1950–1970. Northeastern University Press. ISBN 978-1-55553-161-4.
- Schmertz, Mildred F. (February 1969). "The New Boston City Hall" (PDF). Architectural Forum. Vol. 145, no. 2. pp. 133–144.
- Sirman, Brian M. (2018). Concrete Changes: Architecture, Politics, and the Design of Boston City Hall. University of Massachusetts Press. ISBN 978-1-62534-357-4.
- "What it took to bring about the best public building of our time" (PDF). Interiors. Vol. CXXVIII, no. 9. April 1969.
