= Somerby (surname) =

Somerby is a surname. Notable people with the name include:

- Frederic Thomas Somerby (1814–1871), American painter and sporting writer
- Rufus C. Somerby (1832–1903), American entertainer
