= Somersby =

Somersby may refer to:

== Places ==
- Somersby, Lincolnshire, England
- Somersby, New South Wales, Australia
- Greetham with Somersby, a civil parish in Lincolnshire

== Other ==
- Somersby cider, a Danish brand of cider
- SS Somersby, a British cargo steamship built in 1930
- Sommersby, a 1993 film starring Richard Gere and Jodie Foster

== See also ==
- Somerby (disambiguation)
