= Frederic Thomas Somerby =

American painter and writer

Frederic Thomas Somerby or F.T. Somerby (1814–1871) was a painter and "sporting writer" in Boston, Massachusetts, in the mid-19th century. As an author he contributed to Spirit of the Times. He also worked as a decorative painter and kept a studio in Cornhill (ca.1848-1869); clients included the Nantucket County Whigs. Examples of artwork by Somerby reside in the collection of Historic New England.
