= Brattle Street (Boston) =

Street in Boston, Massachusetts (1694–1962)

Coordinates: 42°21′37.08″N 71°3′28.44″W

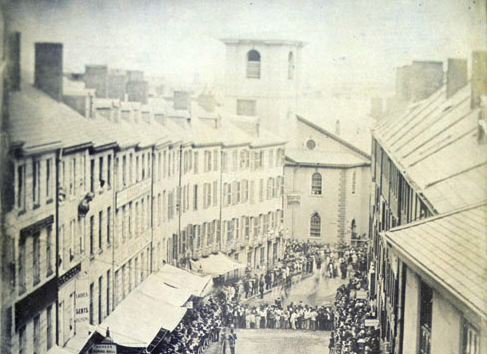
An 1855 illustration of Brattle Street in Boston

Brattle Street, which existed from 1694 to 1962, was a street in Boston, Massachusetts, located on the current site of City Hall Plaza, at Government Center. The street ran the short distance from Scollay Square to Faneuil Hall.

== History ==
=== 18th and 19th centuries ===
John Adams and his family lived on this street for a year in 1768, and in another house in 1770, before moving to Braintree; he may have had a law practice in his house.

Abolitionist David Walker owned a clothing shop in Brattle Street in the 1820s. Around 1853, former Virginia slave Anthony Burns worked for "Coffin Pitts, clothing dealer, no.36 Brattle Street." Nearby, abolitionist John P. Coburn managed a clothing store at 20 Brattle Street.

In 1850, Joshua Bowen Smith, a black abolitionist and member of Boston's Vigilance Committee, operated a catering business at 16 Brattle Street."

=== 20th century ===
In 1921, the first Radio Shack store opened at 46 Brattle Street. The antiquarians Brattle Books was originally located on Brattle Street.

== Gallery ==
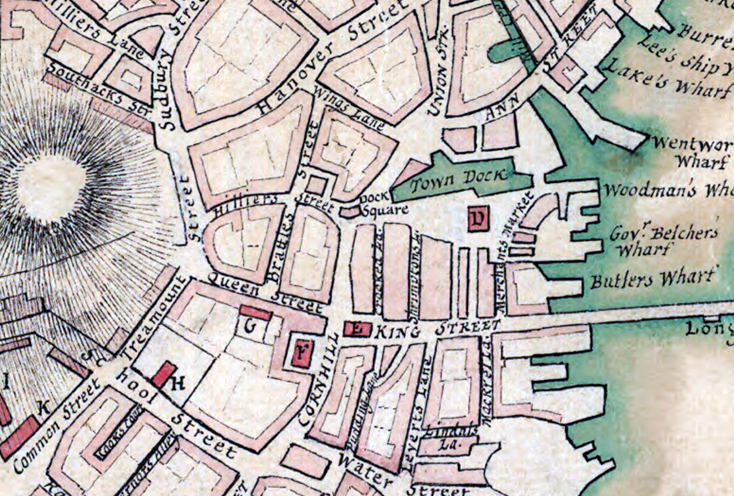
Detail of 1775 map of Boston, showing Brattle St. and vicinity

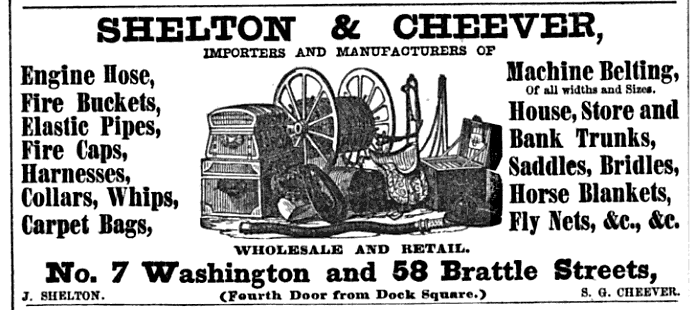
Shelton & Cheever, importers and manufacturers of "engine hose, fire buckets ... harnesses, collars, whips, carpet bags," 1852

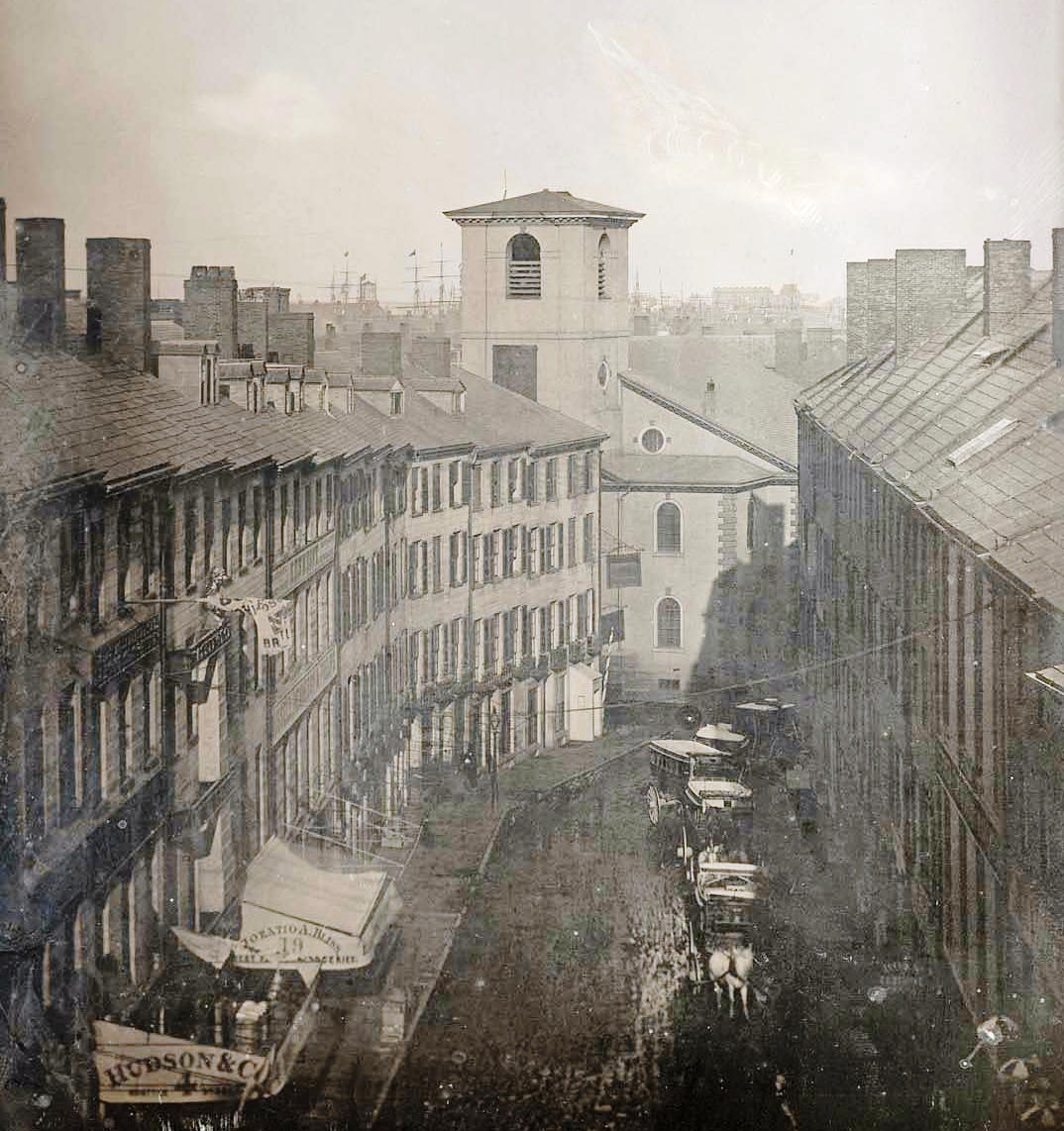
Funeral of Abbott Lawrence, photo by Southworth & Hawes, 1855

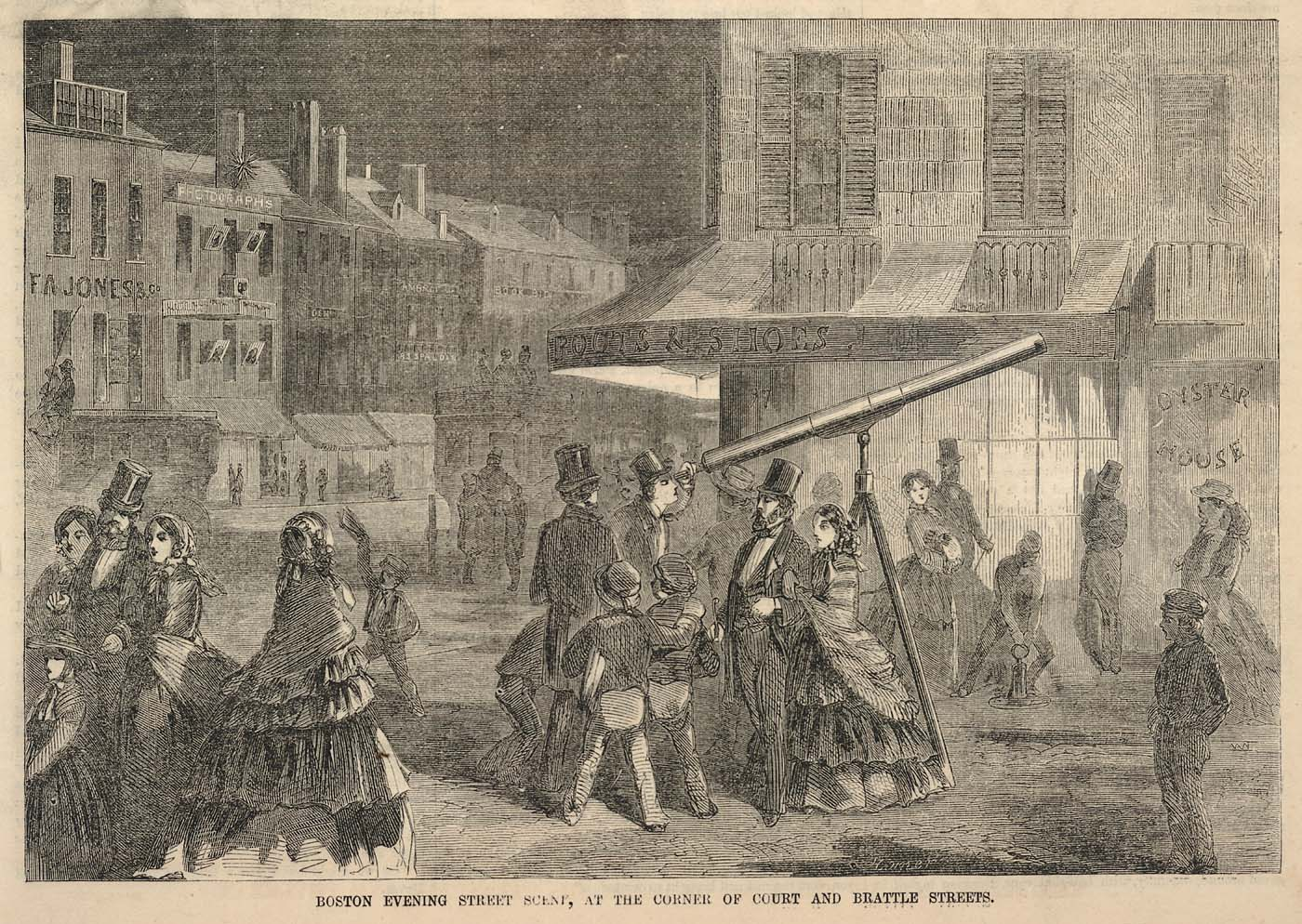
Corner of Brattle and Court St., engraving by Winslow Homer, 1857

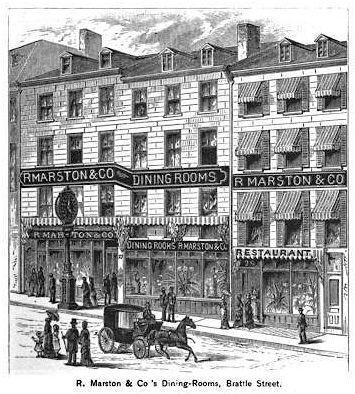
R. Marston & Co. Dining Rooms, ca.1881

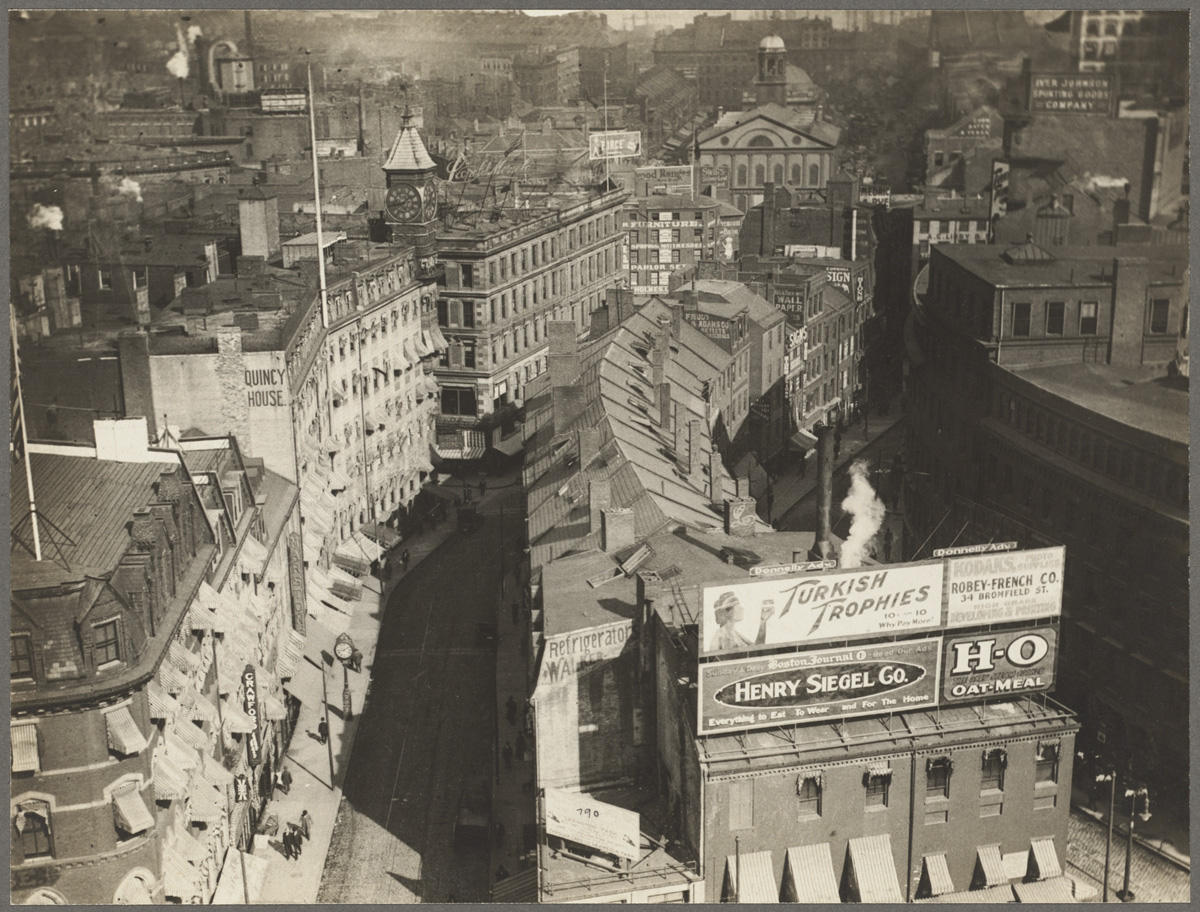
Overview of Brattle St., ca.1920

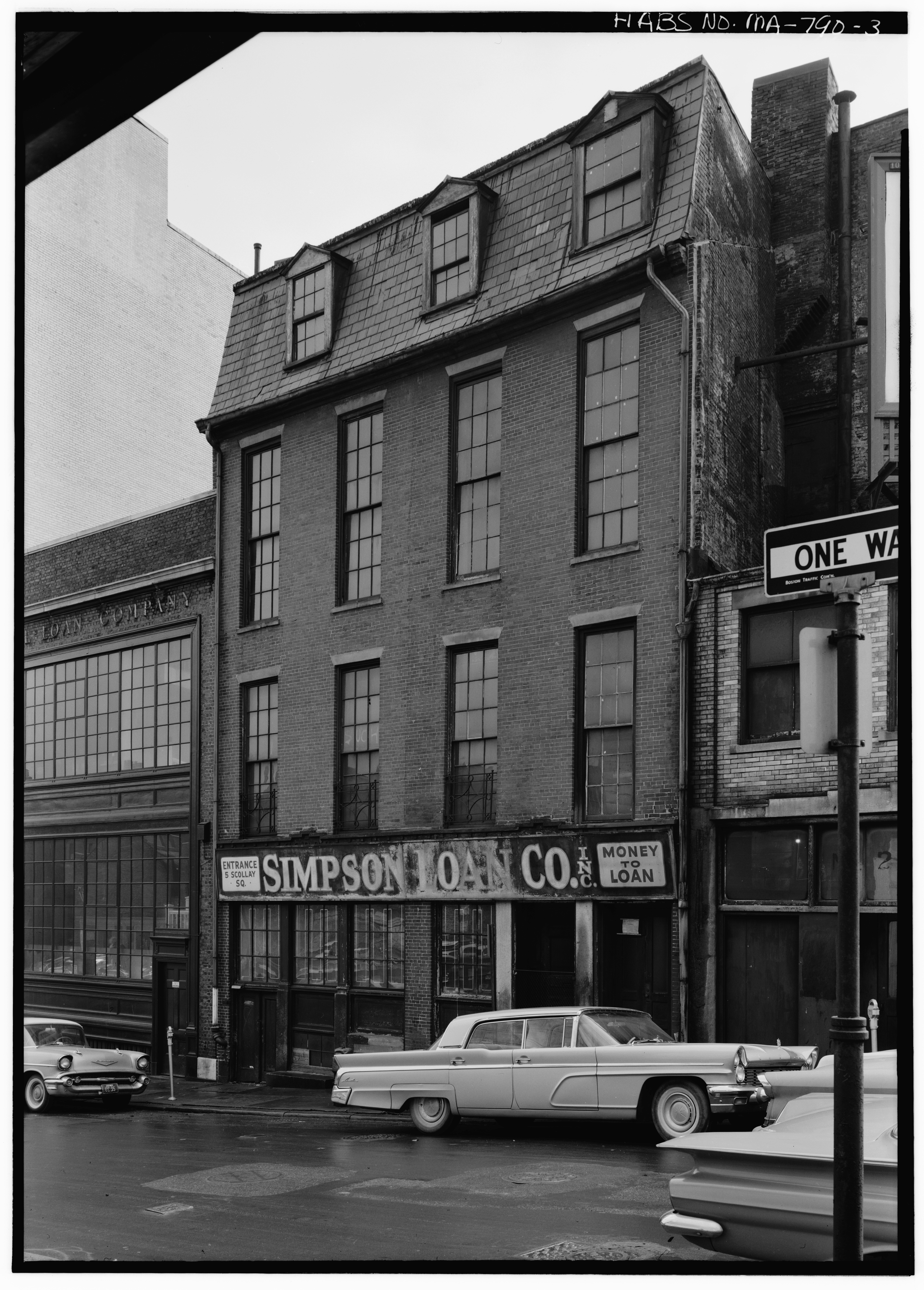
Brattle Street, Boston, 1962

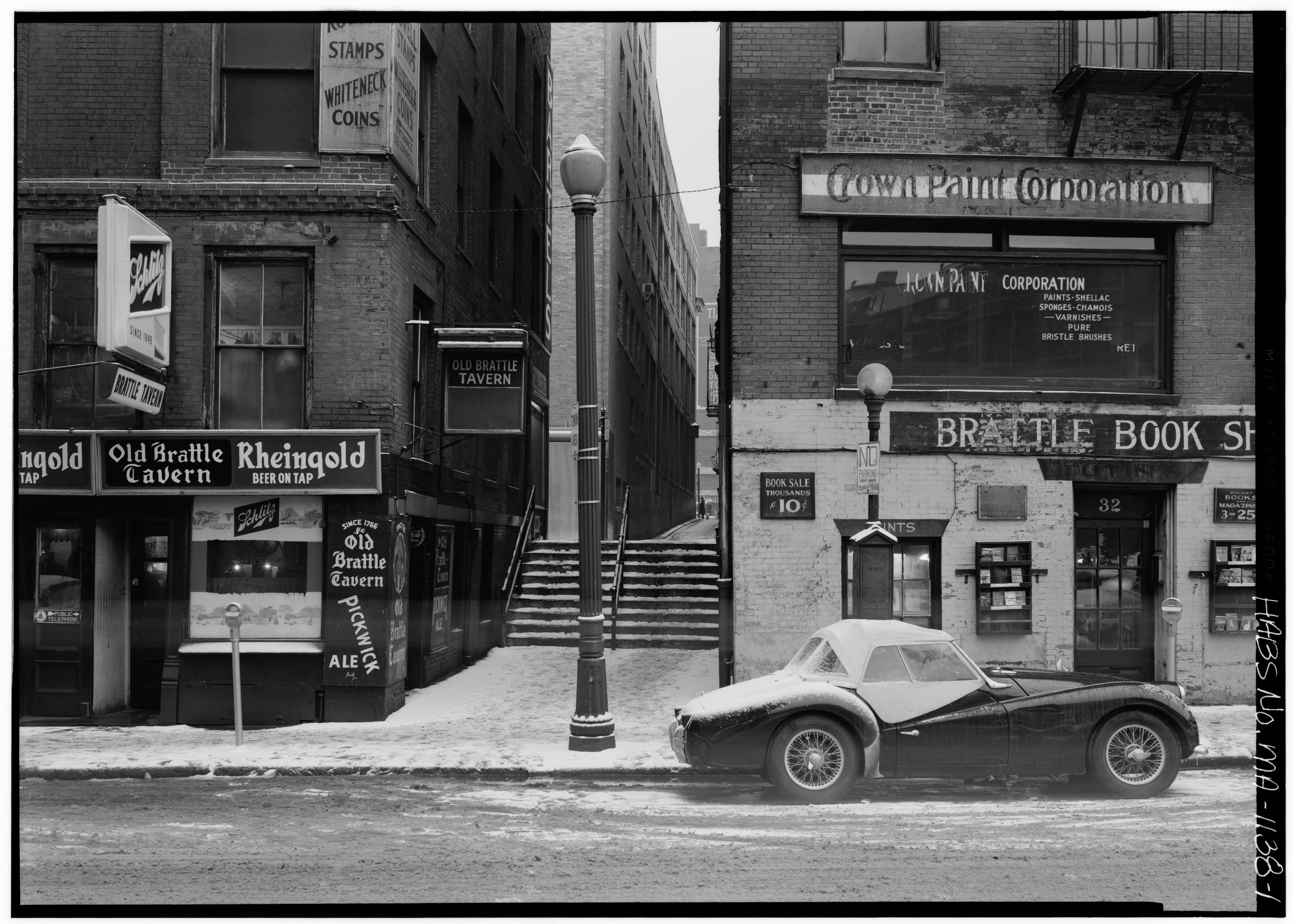
Brattle St., with steps to Cornhill, Boston, 1962

== See also ==
- Brattle Street Church
- John Smibert
