= Hadzi =

Hadzi may refer to:

- Dimitri Hadzi, an American abstract sculptor
- Hadži, an honorific used in Orthodox Christianity in the Balkan countries, related to the Muslim honorary title Hajji
