= One SeaGate =

Building in Toledo, Ohio, United States

Fifth Third Center at One SeaGate
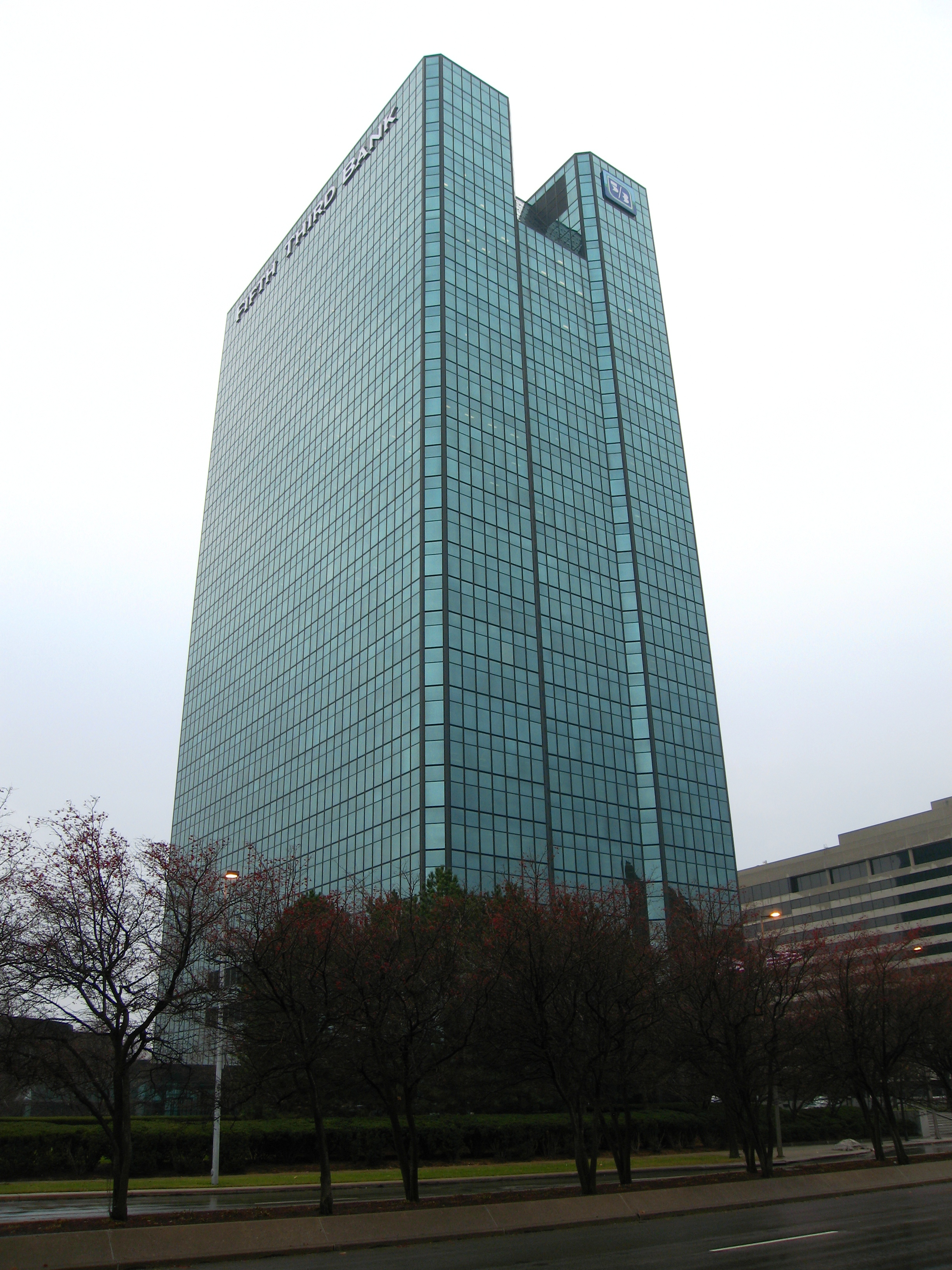
- The Fifth Third Center at One SeaGate.
- Interactive map of the Fifth Third Center at One SeaGate area

General information
- Type: office
- Location: 1 Seagate, Toledo, Ohio
- Coordinates: 41°39′12″N 83°31′50″W
- Construction started: 1979
- Completed: 1982
- Cost: $100 million
- Owner: One SeaGate Partners, LLC

Height
- Roof: 411 ft (125 m)

Technical details
- Floor count: 32
- Floor area: 707,000 sq ft (65,700 m^{2})
- Lifts/elevators: 19 elevators made by Schindler Haughton

Fifth Third Center at One SeaGate is the 2nd tallest building in Toledo, Ohio, behind the Cleveland Cliffs Furnace Tower (457 feet). Until 2006, the building served as the world headquarters for Owens-Illinois. In 2007, Fifth Third Bank moved their Northwest Ohio headquarters to the building. The building's name comes from the plaza in which it is located, which includes three other small buildings. The tallest is only nine floors high. The plaza also includes the entrance to a near-abandoned mall which leads to Imagination Station. The fact that there is no beach on the Maumee River allows buildings to be built on the river's edge - a characteristic used in the design of One Seagate. Other Toledo landmarks built on the river's edge include Promedica's downtown offices, Promenade Park, the Toledo Port Authority, Renaissance Toledo Downtown Hotel, Owens Corning, and Imagination Station.

== Building features ==
Costing $100 million, One SeaGate was built as the centerpiece of the SeaGate project in downtown Toledo. Groundbreaking took place in May 1979, and was officially dedicated in June 1982. The architects were Abramovitz, Harris & Kingsland.

The building stands 432 feet (132 m) away from the Water Street riverfront. The tower is 411 feet (125 m) tall with 33 stories, with 29 floors of office space and two floors for maintenance. Each floor of the office tower has approximately 25,000 square feet (2,320 m^{2}), with 707,000 square feet (65,700 m^{2}) of total leasable space. The building is made up of over 9,135 tons of steel, supported by 28 caissons, going 80 feet (24 m) down into the Earth, and over 36,000 cubic yards (28,000 m^{3}) of concrete. The exterior of the building is covered in 293,000 square feet (27,200 m^{2}) of glass, with 4,400 vision panels and 4,200 spandrel units between floors, representing Toledo's history as the "Glass City," and O-I's presence in the glass industry.

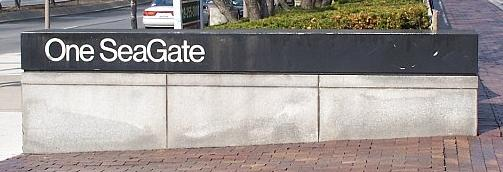
One SeaGate driveway

A 294-seat auditorium is located in the tower complex with an executive parking garage immediately below it, and the building itself is connected to the CitiWalk system. Underground, there is a mini-mall, SeaGate Shops at CitiWalk, that was left primarily vacant after the departure of O-I. When the building opened, Edwin Dodd, then O-I's Chairman and CEO, exerted his considerable influence to fill the Promenade level shops with tenants. Damschroeder's and Ricardo's Restaurant were two large tenants who were convinced to move in. The mini-mall has a small eatery area that leads to Promenade Park and Fountain Square, which features the Dimitri Hadzi sculpture, Propylaea. The tunnels also connect the building to the Renaissance Toledo Downtown Hotel at Two SeaGate, Four SeaGate (the former home of Fox Toledo joined WTOL in 2012 and relocated to the WTOL studio), a parking structure across Summit Street, and Imagination Station. The top floor accessible to occupants, the 28th, formerly included a fine restaurant that was frequented by business professionals. When the building opened, the 28th floor restaurant was an executive dining room with boardroom and meeting room facilities adjacent, for O-I senior executives whose offices were immediately below on the 27th floor. The 29th floor was exclusively mechanical. On the service level, there are loading docks for the convenience of tenants and the management of the building. The building is owned by One SeaGate Partners, LLC, an affiliate of Amtrust Realty.

== The O-I Building ==
Until 2006 the world headquarters for Owens-Illinois were at One Seagate. At that time the headquarters were moved to the Levis Commons complex in the nearby suburb of Perrysburg, Ohio, where the company already owned a large facility. The company stated they were not necessarily hurting the area's economy, as they were moving a short drive south. Toledoans often refer to One SeaGate as "the O-I building."

== Fifth Third Bankcorp ==

On January 23, 2007, it was announced that the Northwest Ohio offices for Fifth Third Bank would be moving into OneSeaGate. Under the new terms, the building was renamed: "Fifth Third Center at One SeaGate." Fifth Third signage was put on the top of the skyscraper, as the company has done with their locations elsewhere. The move lets the company move all of its offices to one location, removing the need for the company's current Monroe Street offices. The company chose not to occupy the top floors, including the prestigious offices of the O-I executives, because renovation would cost too much. Fifth Third rents out floors 4, 21, 22, 23, and parts of the lobby (for a banking center) and the service level for about $20 per square foot, as opposed to the $16 charge at their previous Madison Avenue location, the bank's Northwest Ohio home since 1931.

== Tenants ==
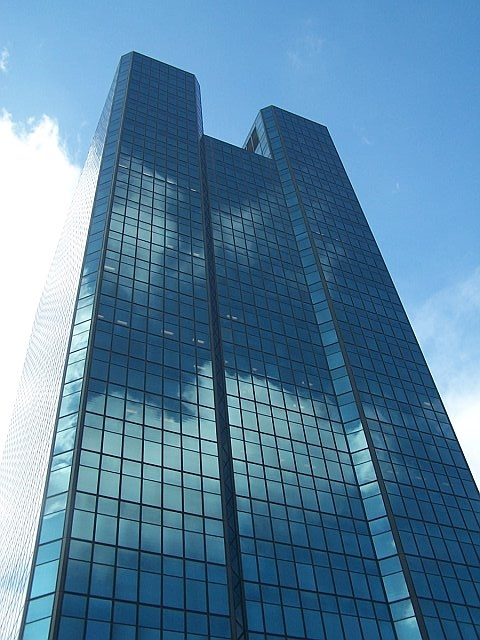
The tower's appearance prior to being renamed Fifth Third Center at One SeaGate.

Current tenants include:

- Fifth Third Bank, the building's prime tenant
- Reichle | Klein Group
- CliftonLarsonAllen
- PricewaterhouseCoopers
- Ernst & Young
- Civil & Environmental Consultants, Inc.
- Arcadis, U.S.
- Eastman & Smith Ltd.
- Kingston HealthCare Company
- Emch, Schaffer, Schaub & Porcello Co., L.P.A.
- Reminger Co., LPA
- Gressley, Kaplan, & Parker
- Roetzel & Andres
- Findley Davies
- ProMedica
- Stockwell & Cooperman
- LearnShare
- Fahlgren
- Social Security Administration, Office of Disability Adjudication and Review
- American Broadband & Telecommunications
- WPP Plc (Kantar)
- Toledo Design Center
- Tungsten Network
- Oldcastle BuildingEnvelope

== See also ==
- List of tallest buildings in Toledo, Ohio
- Toledo, Ohio
- Propylaea
- Owens-Illinois
- Fifth Third Bank
