= Propylaea (disambiguation) =

Propylaea may refer to:

- Propylaea (Acropolis of Athens)
- Propylaea (Munich)
- Propylaea (sculpture)
- Propylaea (University of Athens)
- The Propylaeum
