= Thermopylae (disambiguation) =

Thermopylae is a mountain passage in central Greece.

Thermopylae may also refer to:

- Thermopylae (clipper), an extreme composite clipper ship built 1868
- HMS Thermopylae (P355), Royal Navy submarine launched in 1945
- Thermopylae (sculpture), a 1966 bronze sculpture by Dimitri Hadzi
- Thermopylae, a poem written by the Greek poet Constantine P. Cavafy
- Thermopylae, North Carolina, the fictional setting of Michael Malone's novel, Handling Sin

== See also ==
- Battle of Thermopylae (disambiguation)
- Thermophile
- Thermopile
