= Elmo-MIT =

Sculpture in Cambridge, Massachusetts, U.S.

- The sculpture in 2019
- Artist: Dimitri Hadzi
- Medium: Bronze sculpture
- Location: Cambridge, Massachusetts, U.S.
- 42°21′32.74″N 71°5′22.89″W

Elmo-MIT is a 1960s bronze sculpture by Dimitri Hadzi, installed on the Massachusetts Institute of Technology campus, in Cambridge, Massachusetts, United States.

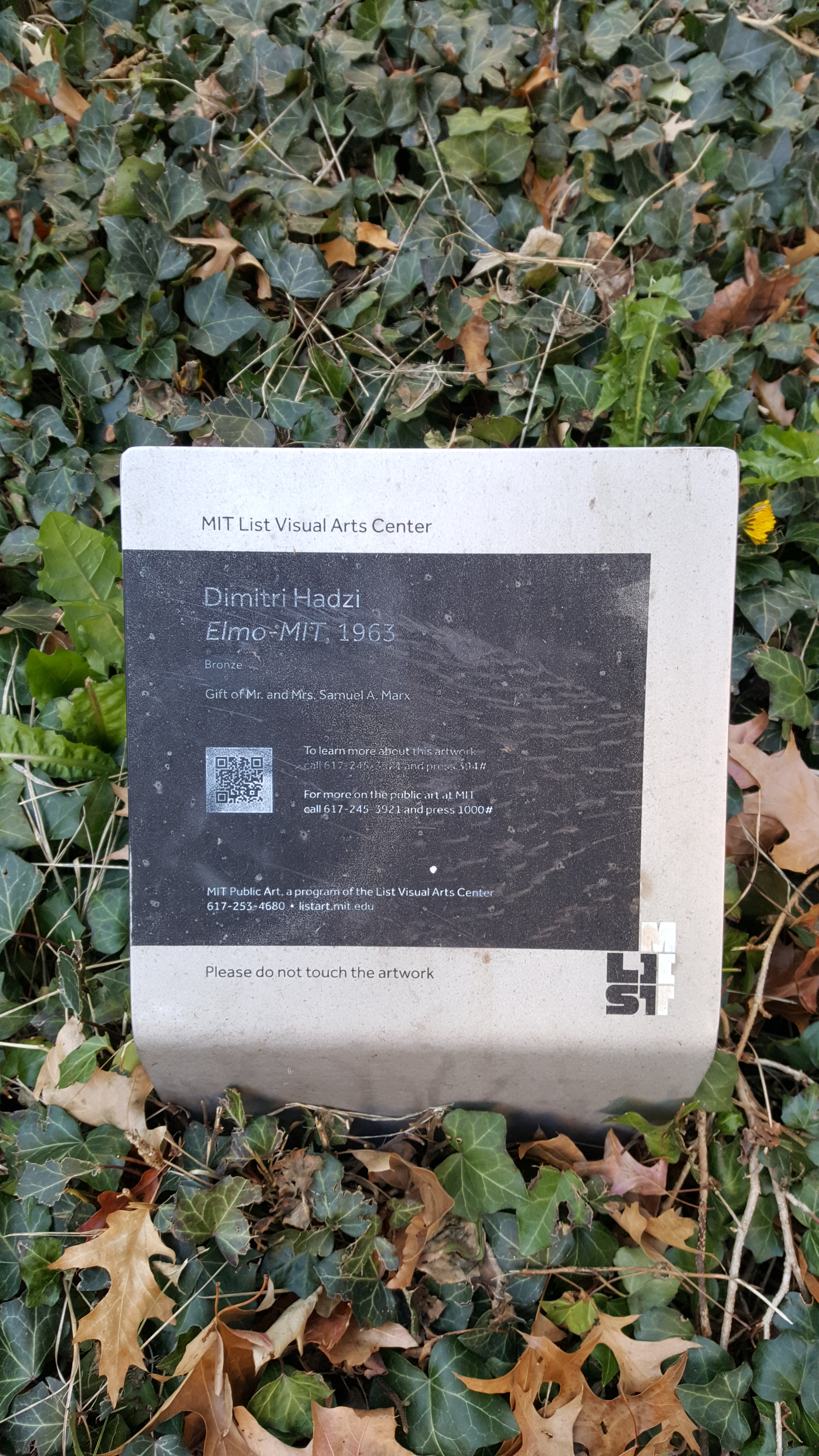
Plaque for the sculpture, 2019
