= John F. Kennedy Federal Building =

Building in Boston, Massachusetts

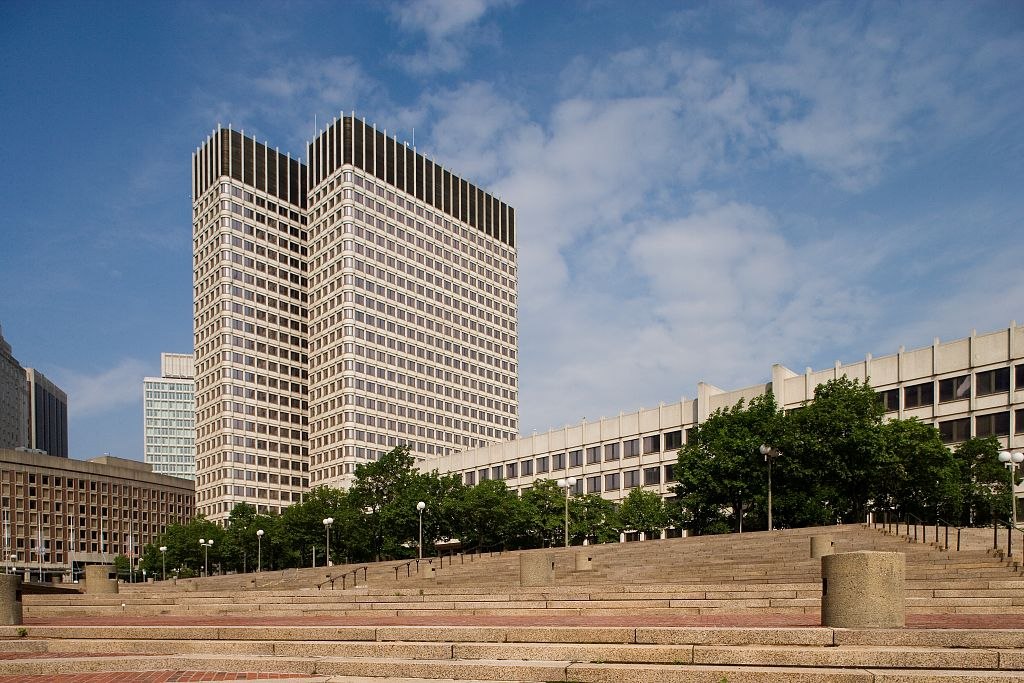
- Exterior (2006)

General information
- Architectural style: Modern
- Location: 15 Sudbury Street, Government Center, Boston, Massachusetts, US
- Coordinates: 42°21′41″N 71°3′34″W
- Named for: John F. Kennedy
- Year built: 1963–1966
- Opened: September 9, 1966; 60 years ago
- Owner: General Services Administration

Height
- Height: 387 feet (118 m)

Technical details
- Material: Steel, reinforced concrete, glass
- Floor count: 26 (towers), 4 (low-rise), 3 (connecting corridor)

Design and construction
- Architects: The Architects Collaborative (including Walter Gropius), Samuel Glaser Associates
- Structural engineer: LeMessurier Consultants
- John F. Kennedy Federal Building
- U.S. National Register of Historic Places
- NRHP reference No.: 100007130
- Added to NRHP: November 15, 2021

The John F. Kennedy Federal Building is a United States governmental office building in the Government Center area of Boston, Massachusetts. Named for former US president John F. Kennedy, the building was completed in 1966 and designed by Walter Gropius and The Architects Collaborative with Samuel Glaser. It consists of a pair of 26-story, 387-foot (118 m) towers to the west, and a four-story low-rise wing with an interior courtyard to the east, connected by a glass corridor. The building was listed on the National Register of Historic Places in 2021.

The building occupies about half of a 4.5-acre (1.8 ha) site oriented southwest–northeast. The rest of the parcel contains landscaping, along with plazas adjoining the nearby Boston City Hall Plaza. The grounds have two sculptures honoring Kennedy: Dimitri Hadzi's Thermopylae and Herbert Ferber's Full Circle: Profile in Courage. The facade is made of polished granite cladding on the lower stories and reinforced concrete on the upper stories, with glass windows and curved corners. The building spans 839,000 square feet (77,900 m^{2}) with concrete slabs in the low-rise wing and a steel superstructure elsewhere. The two basement levels have ancillary areas, such as storage, while the first floor has two lobbies, a clinic, offices, and a laboratory. Above the first floor, the low-rise wing has spaces such as offices, a cafeteria, conference spaces, and light industrial space, while the tower is mainly devoted to offices.

The building was developed as part of the Government Center megaproject, first proposed in the late 1950s. Site selection was delayed due to disagreements between the General Services Administration (GSA) and the city, but the site and architects were eventually selected in 1961. A groundbreaking ceremony for the site took place on July 8, 1963, and the site was dedicated by Kennedy's brother Robert F. Kennedy on September 9, 1966. During the late 20th century, the building underwent several fire-safety upgrades and a renovation, and a plan to demolish the low-rise wing was unsuccessful. In the 21st century, it has continued to host federal agencies. Over the years, the JFK Federal Building received mixed commentary.

== Site ==
The JFK Federal Building is located at 15 New Sudbury Street in the Government Center section of Downtown Boston, Massachusetts, United States. The building occupies a 4.5-acre (1.8 ha) site measuring roughly 275 by 723 feet (84 by 220 m) across. The site is oriented northeast–southwest, on axis with the intercardinal directions, and is bounded by Congress Street to the northeast, New Sudbury Street to the northwest, and Cambridge Street to the southwest. The building abuts Boston City Hall Plaza to the southeast. Originally, the section of City Hall Plaza near the JFK Building included a fountain and a promenade of trees. The building's form, or general shape and configuration, consists of twin towers beside a low-rise wing.

=== Landscape and hardscape features ===
The building occupies about 45% of the parcel, the rest of which is occupied by extensive landscaping, along with hardscape features such as plazas and driveways. A plaza wraps around the building's southwest and southeast elevations. Gray-granite parapets, with aluminum railings and inset light fixtures, wrap around the site's northeast and southwest corners. The plaza is divided into two levels. The two levels impeded pedestrian circulation somewhat, since pedestrians in City Hall Plaza had to ascend to reach the JFK Building plaza's upper section.

The upper portion of the plaza, near the high-rise towers to the west, is paved in dark granite. The upper plaza has two conical air-circulation vents measuring 13 feet (4.0 m) in diameter and 8 feet (2.4 m) tall, with granite benches, along with a smaller conical exhaust vent for the emergency generators. The upper plaza also has concrete tables surrounded by benches of the same material, along with standalone metal-and-concrete benches. The retaining wall surrounding the upper plaza is made of polished granite. Abutting the south side of the low-rise wing, situated to the east, is a lower plaza. The lower plaza is made of red brick, the same material as the neighboring City Hall Plaza. As built, the two plazas are level with each other. Concrete traffic bollards, installed after the September 11 attacks, separate the lower plaza from City Hall Plaza.

The northeast and northwest elevations (facing Congress and New Sudbury streets respectively) have sidewalks, entrances, and driveways. On both elevations, there are shrubs, a grassy strip, and a pipe railing separating the building from the sidewalk. On the Congress Street elevation is a driveway to the low-rise wing's ground-story basement (below the first floor), with a security screening booth. At the northern corner is a playground, with a concrete wall separating it from the intersection of Congress and New Sudbury streets. On New Sudbury Street, there is a driveway and security booth, which restrict access to a ground-level parking area just outside a loading dock. Just to the west (abutting the tower section) is a curved drop-off loop leading to one of the low-rise wing's entrances. The landscape design also originally included a variety of tree species. Some of the original oak and linden trees remain extant near the low-rise wing, and there are also periwinkle and winter creeper in the low-rise wing's internal courtyard.

=== Outdoor artwork ===
Dimitri Hadzi's abstract bronze sculpture Thermopylae is located in front of one tower.

The building has two outdoor sculptures. Dimitri Hadzi's abstract bronze sculpture Thermopylae, in front of one tower, was created in 1966. Thermopylae measures 16 feet (4.9 m) tall and weighs 2.5 short tons (2.2 long tons; 2.3 t), being made of twenty pieces. It was named for the Battle of Thermopylae, which took place in 480 BCE, and inspired by President John F. Kennedy's book Profiles in Courage and his war record. In 1966, Herbert Ferber designed an abstract sculpture of welded copper and stainless steel, Full Circle: Profile in Courage, which was installed in 1968. Installed within the interior light court, Full Circle measures 12 by 14 feet (3.7 by 4.3 m) across and consists of several curved design details penetrating a circle.

== Architecture ==
The building was designed by The Architects Collaborative (TAC), along with Samuel Glaser Associates. The architects most involved with the design were TAC partners in charge Walter Gropius and Norman C. Fletcher, TAC senior associate Roland Kluve, and Glaser Associates architects Samuel Glaser and Clifford H. Towne. Towne also coordinated communications between the architects and the building's client, the U.S. General Services Administration (GSA). LeMessurier Consultants was the structural engineer. In designing the building, Gropius said he wanted to eliminate all preconceptions of the building so it could "function both practically and psychologically". Gropius said the federal building's design complemented that of the new City Hall, and, in response to implications that the design lacked originality, said that "we cannot make a new architecture every month".

=== Form ===
The towers rise 26 stories, and the low-rise wing is four stories high. The building, with its towers, is cited as measuring 387 feet (118 m) tall. (Note: The National Park Service gives a different figure of 392 feet (119 m).) Each tower has a rectangular, 185-by-60-foot (56 by 18 m) floor plan. The conjoined towers are oriented with their longer axes northwest–southeast and are offset from each other; the western tower extends farther south, while the eastern tower extends farther north.

The low-rise wing is about 105 2/3 feet (32.2 m) tall and has a rectangular, 147-by-446 2/3-foot (44.8 by 136.1 m) floor plan. Its longer axis is oriented northeast–southwest, extending perpendicularly off the towers. The low-rise wing's second story protrudes from the facade's southern elevation. There is an interior courtyard of about 123 by 43 feet (37 by 13 m) at the low-rise wing's center. This courtyard has a Japanese maple and a floor surface composed of red squares and octagons, accented with gray.

The combination of tall and short massings is a common Modern form that is used extensively throughout the United States and abroad, including in other GSA buildings such as Denver's Byron G. Rogers Federal Building and Los Angeles's Wilshire Federal Building. The GSA also wanted to physically separate regional and nationwide offices. The double towers were a compromise between GSA requirements and the Government Center development's design principles. The GSA had mandated that high-rise tower floors be at least 19,000 square feet (1,800 m^{2}), which typically would have created a thicker tower, but the building was supposed to have only 14,000 to 15,000 square feet (1,300 to 1,400 m^{2}) on average. The decision to create conjoined towers was inspired by a contemporaneous building in Düsseldorf, Germany, which consisted of three conjoined rectangular masses. To avoid drawing attention from Boston City Hall as the focal point of City Hall Plaza, the towers are placed at the western end of the site, away from the plaza. The double towers increased the number of offices lit by natural light, and they allowed the building to meet the GSA's minimum floor area requirements. In addition, with the office space split into conjoined towers, it was less visually domineering than monolithic high-rise buildings, such as Prudential Tower.

=== Facade ===
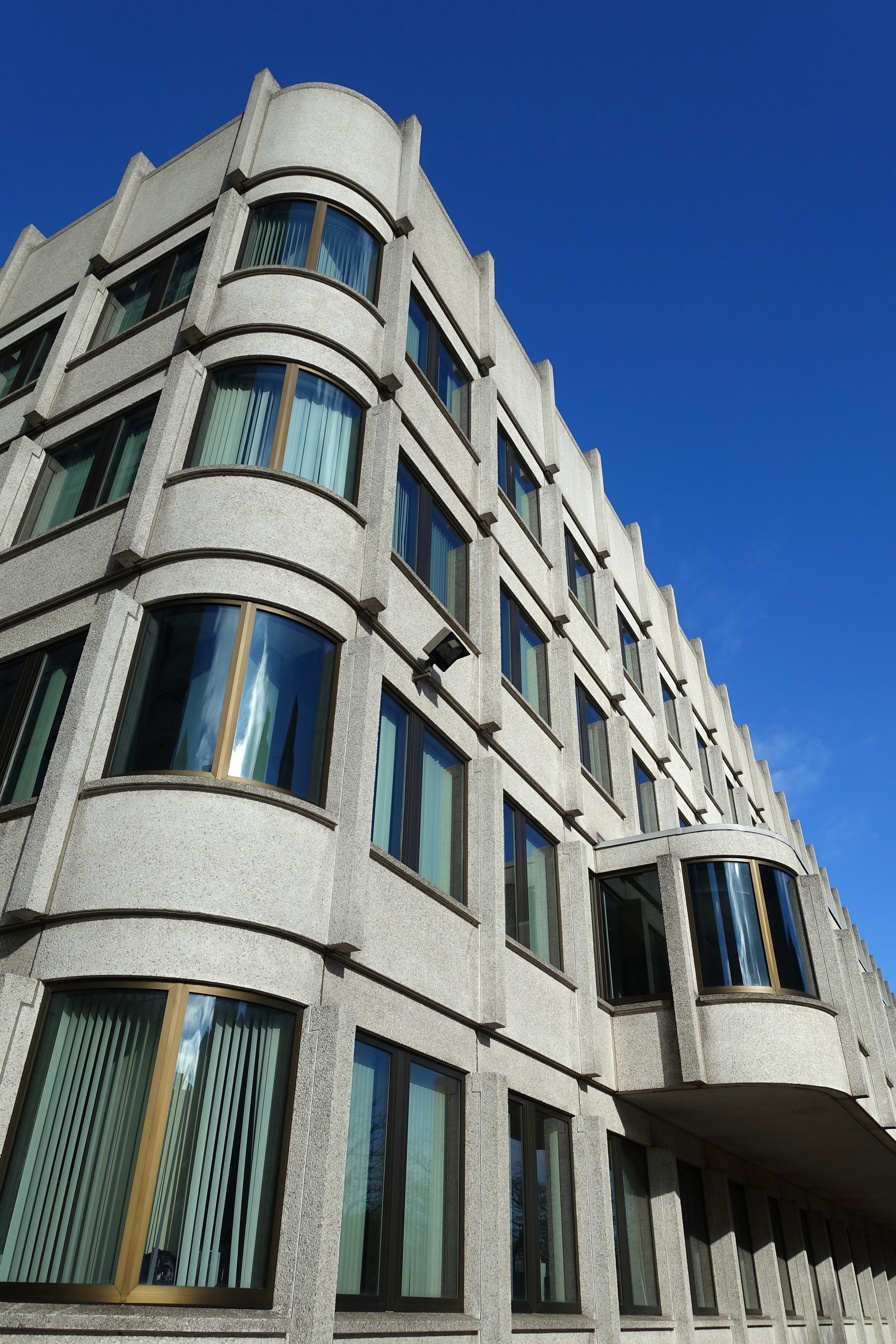
Close-up of facade panels on the low-rise wing

In general, the facade lacks ornamentation and uses the same concrete-and-glass wall design. The exterior aluminum work is medium-gray with a dark anodized finish. The lower stories have polished granite cladding, while the upper stories are covered in precast panels made of reinforced concrete. Similarly to Gropius's earlier Pan Am Building, the panels were made using the Mo-Sai method, with quartz aggregate embedded into white concrete. The panels measure 12 2/3 feet (3.9 m) tall and divide the building vertically into bays measuring 9 2/3 feet (2.9 m) wide. Each bay has a single panel per story, with a thicker spandrel at its bottom and a thinner, recessed lintel or sub-spandrel at its top. The bays are vertically separated by protruding, precast concrete fins, which are interrupted by the lintels. The corners have rounded edges, which conceal columns at the corners of the steel frame. The rounded corners may allude to the curved streets that formerly occupied Scollay Square, or the curved facade of Sears' Crescent and Sears' Block, a pair of buildings across City Hall Plaza.

The concrete panels' windows are arranged in bands extending horizontally across the facade. Some parts of the facade use glass walls, which, along with the low-rise wing's courtyard and the exterior hardscaping, were intended to visually link the outdoor and indoor spaces. The towers and low-rise wing are connected at their first and third stories. The connector's first story has a double-height glass curtain wall. The third story, has a similar concrete facade to the rest of the building, is supported on a pair of 50-foot-long (15 m) girders spanning the two buildings, giving the impression that it floats above the ground-story facade.

==== Low-rise wing ====
The low-rise wing's ground level is clad in granite and has a more irregular window arrangement than the first story and above. At the first story, the southeast elevation has an entrance pavilion leading to one of its lobbies. The entrance is positioned off-center, with a cantilevered portico, and is flanked by a pair of precast-concrete piers. Between the piers, a set of granite stairs leads to a deeply recessed set of plate-glass doors. Above the first-story portico, the entrance pavilion has deeply recessed tempered-glass windows. The northwest elevation on New Sudbury Street has a similar entrance pavilion, which faces the drop-off loop. New Sudbury Street has additional, smaller entrances: three for vehicles and one for pedestrians. The northeast elevation on Congress Street has a garage door.

The low-rise courtyard is surrounded by another facade. On the first story and part of the second story, the courtyard facade is primarily composed of glass panels separated by concrete fins. The rest of the courtyard's second story, along with its entire third story, has a similar concrete facade to the rest of the building.

==== Towers ====
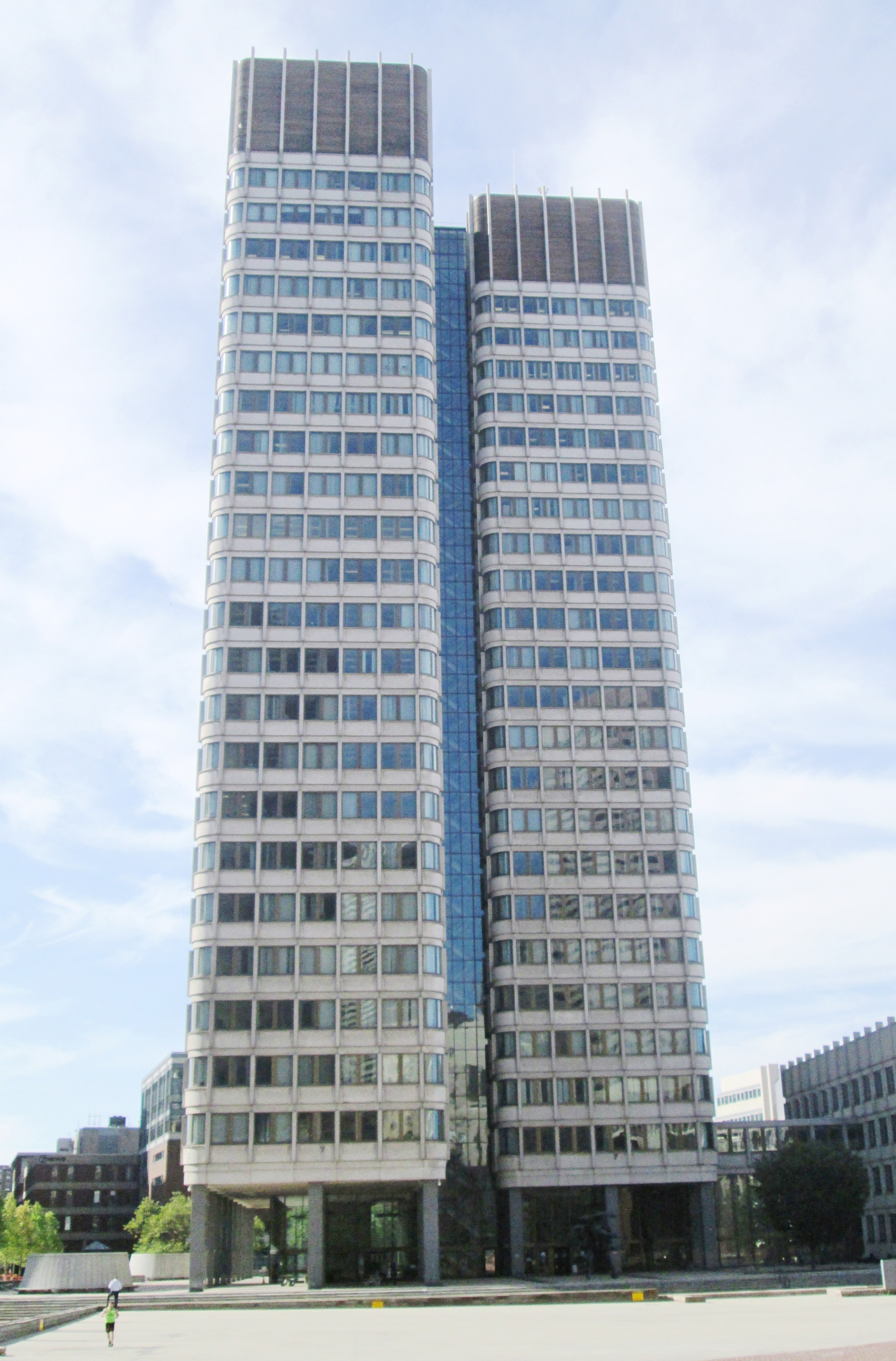
The two towers

The towers' first stories have an arcade with set-back entrances. The arcade contains double-height polished-granite pilotis, or stilts, which support the third and higher stories. The lobby facade, recessed from the pilotis, consists of a double-height glass wall. The pilotis, along with the lobby columns, are spaced at regular intervals, corresponding to the widths of the facade's bays. Columns running northeast–southwest are spaced 23–27 feet (7.0–8.2 m) apart, and columns running northwest–southeast are spaced 19–21 feet (5.8–6.4 m) apart.

An exposed glass atrium connects the two towers. The atrium walls, which face southeast and northwest, measure 17 feet (5.2 m) wide and extend to the towers' rooflines. The tops of the towers have metal louvers. There is a low concrete parapet on the rooftop above the louvers; the towers' concrete fins protrude past the top of the parapet.

=== Interior ===
The JFK Federal Building covers 839,000 square feet (77,900 m^{2}). The low-rise wing contains 400,000 square feet (37,000 m^{2}). At the base, a mechanical core connects the office towers to the lower levels. Both wings have elevator cores, around which restrooms are clustered. Structurally, the building's foundation consists of a concrete mat. The superstructure of the low-rise wing is made of concrete slabs, and the rest of the building has a steel superstructure. The interior floor plan is divided into square modules measuring 4 feet 10 inches (1.47 m) on each side, exactly half the width of the exterior bays. The building has 13 passenger elevators and one freight elevator, grouped into three elevator banks.

==== Below-grade levels ====
In the two stories beneath the first floor, both the office towers and the low-rise wing have ancillary areas, such as storage. In the cellar (two stories below the first floor), the low-rise wing has a parking garage, while the towers have office, light industrial, maintenance, and storage areas. The parking garage has a concrete floor surface, while other parts of the cellar have vinyl-tile floors; the entire basement has concrete walls and a 14-foot-tall (4.3 m) ceiling. The cellar's parking spaces are interrupted by elevator banks to the northeast and southwest, and there are stairs at the parking lot's northeastern wall and along the southwestern elevator bank. The parking garage also has a pit for the freight elevator and an ancillary room. The spaces in the towers' cellar are accessed by a hallway from the parking garage; the hallway's southwestern end has restrooms, along with a stair and elevator.

The ground floor (one story below the first) generally has vinyl-tile floors, sheetrock or concrete block walls, and 12-foot-tall (3.7 m) dropped ceilings. The low-rise wing's ground floor has employee amenity areas. The rooms are irregular in shape and include a fitness center at the northern corner, a loading dock to the northwest, and a mailroom and childcare center abutting the loading dock. The ground floor has its own small escalator lobby with elevators and stairs, accessed via an entrance from the northwest. The ground-floor rooms were originally arranged around a "U"-shaped corridor, with parallel passageways connected at the northeast, but the northwestern passageway was removed when the rooms there were expanded. An S-shaped passageway, flanked by storage spaces, runs southwest to the towers. Within the towers' ground floor is an elevator lobby, served by three banks of elevators and surrounded by ancillary and storage areas.

==== First floor ====
The building's primary lobby is a 95-by-105-foot (29 by 32 m) space within the office towers, with a 29-foot-tall (8.8 m) ceiling. The floor has patterns of light and dark granite pavers running between the columns. The lobby columns are made of granite and are identical to the pilotis outside, down to the column spacing. The ceiling has a gridded, plaster and sheetrock finish with suspended lighting fixtures. The lobby has three banks of elevators. A quote from John F. Kennedy's presidential inaugural address in 1961 is inscribed into the central bank's wall. The lobby also has staircases flanking the towers' central glass atrium to the northeast and southwest. Revolving exhibits focus on aspects of Kennedy's life and presidency.

The connector between the towers and the low-rise wing

In the connector between the towers and the low-rise wing, the first story has a similar granite floor and plaster-and-sheetrock ceiling to the main lobby. New England Elegy, an abstract mural by Robert Motherwell, occupies the connector. This abstract artwork has a blue lower border, a horizontal yellow center line, and irregular patterns in black and white. After the connector enters the low-rise wing, a ramp ascends to a corridor on the wing's first floor. The corridor has gridded tiled floors, sheetrock walls, and dropped ceilings.

The low-rise wing's first story generally has 12 2/3 feet (3.9 m) ceilings, except for a double-height secondary lobby. The connecting corridor is flanked by offices, a laboratory and clinic, and ancillary space; it terminates on the southwestern wall of the low-rise wing's escalator lobby. The escalator lobby has two elevators at its western corner and stairs on the northwest wall. The northeast wall of the escalator lobby has a glass wall (overlooking the interior courtyard's southwestern elevation). Corridors inside the building run alongside the courtyard's northwestern and southeastern elevations, leading northeastward to the secondary lobby, a rectangular space. The secondary lobby has a concrete stairway to the southwest (paralleling the courtyard), along with gridded tile floors. A passage on the secondary lobby's southeastern wall leads to the entrance pavilion from the plaza. To the northeast is a granite elevator bank with curved corners, along with stairs, mechanical spaces, and restrooms. The rest of the low-rise wing's first story, surrounding the escalator and secondary lobbies and the corridors, has offices.

==== Upper stories ====
The upper stories contain meeting rooms and offices. As with the first story, the low-rise wing's upper floors have 12 2/3-foot (3.9 m) ceilings. The low-rise wing's upper floors contain additional offices, light industry, and meeting spaces. On all three of the low-rise wing's upper stories, stairs, escalators, and restrooms adjoin each floor's escalator lobbies on the northwestern and southeastern walls. On the second floor, the layout is similar to the first floor, and there are escalators from the escalator lobby and a mezzanine above the secondary lobby. The southern corner includes a cafeteria with 2,600 seats. There is a conference center next to the cafeteria and another conference room at the second floor's northeast end. Additional conference rooms are at the southwest and northeast ends of the third floor and the southwest end of the fourth floor. Also on the fourth floor are a radio room at the western corner, along with workshops, locker rooms, fitness center, and processing area overlooking two sides of the courtyard. The rest of the second through fourth floors contain offices.

The towers' upper floors have 12 2/3-foot (3.9 m) ceilings, except for the 25th floor, which has a 37-foot (11 m) ceiling. The third floor has a courtroom at its southern end, which is used as a federal immigration court. The remaining floor area on these stories is used as offices, surrounding the elevators, stairs, and mechanical spaces in the center. These spaces have various finishes such as carpeting, dropped ceilings, and movable partitions. The top two floors of the office towers are used for mechanical equipment.

== History ==
=== Planning ===
==== Early plans ====
In the 1950s, Mayor John Hynes devised plans to redevelop Scollay Square, a blighted area in Downtown Boston. At the time, there were efforts to consolidate governmental agencies from several locations across Boston. The planned federal building was intended to lure private development in the area; at that point, Boston was losing thousands of jobs and residents to suburban communities. Having a single federal building would also allow the GSA to save money since it would no longer have to lease space from third parties. Hynes announced plans in 1956 for Government Center, which would replace Scollay Square with city, state, and federal government buildings. Public reaction to the plan was mixed. The United States Congress had already approved the construction of a new Boston federal building, for which $28 million was available. (Note: Equivalent to $236.2 million in 2025) By early 1957, there was uncertainty on whether the federal building would proceed. The city government had agreed to erect the federal building and lease it to the federal government, but General Services Administration (GSA) administrator Franklin G. Floete had suspended this agreement.

In early 1957, the city asked that the Massachusetts House of Representatives approve a request to acquire land and borrow money for the federal building and the adjacent New City Hall; the House ultimately granted the request for City Hall. By December 1957, federal officials were again interested in a new building at Government Center. The next month, the federal government agreed to become involved, as long as the complex included state and city government buildings and involved the city's full participation. The federal government agreed to fund most of Government Center's site-acquisition and demolition costs. Although the federal government was reluctant to have the city erect the structure under the lease-purchase program, Floete said in April that the GSA was still willing to construct the federal building if work on the city and state buildings were expedited. A schematic drawing of the complex was released in October 1958. There would have been a 15-story federal office building at the center of the site, closer to Faneuil Hall, while the current site of the JFK Federal Building would have been occupied by an office tower with a rhombus floor plan. The federal government committed to build an office structure there that month.

==== Land acquisition ====
Government Center's development was delayed due to uncertainty over where—or even whether—the federal building would be built. Government Center's site plan had been finalized by early 1959, except for the new City Hall and the proposed federal building, and the federal government's involvement was contingent on an agreement over the building's location, City Hall was tentatively assigned a site in the center of the development, east of Scollay Square, while the federal building was assigned a site on New Sudbury Street. Floete was unhappy with the site he was assigned, and he contemplated erecting the building in the Back Bay, where the federal government already owned land. The city government agreed to allow the federal government to use the new City Hall site in June 1959, after six months of negotiations. Floete quickly lost interest in the new City Hall site. The federal government obtained an alternate site from the city in August 1959, adjoining Old City Hall on Washington Street, and offered the Back Bay site in a land swap. Local business groups expressed opposition to the Washington Street site. The next month, Floete agreed to reconsider erecting the building at Government Center, and a state judge issued an injunction preventing acquisition of the Washington Street site.

By October 1959, the federal building was again planned to be built at Government Center, but the federal government still wanted the site assigned to the new City Hall. Continued uncertainties over the new City Hall and state buildings held up approval of the federal building. John F. Collins became mayor in 1960 and appointed Edward J. Logue to lead the Boston Redevelopment Authority (BRA), the agency that oversaw all of the city's urban renewal projects. At Logue's recommendation, the BRA hired I. M. Pei to design the master plan for Government Center. Pei's proposal, which replaced an earlier master plan from Adams, Howard & Greeley, entailed replacing most of Scollay Square with a series of governmental buildings. That April, Floete told Collins that the federal government would develop its structure only if at least one other building were built on the opposite side of New Sudbury Street from the federal building, separating it from the nearby West End neighborhood. The Housing and Home Finance Agency authorized $28–29 million for Government Center in December 1959. (Note: Equivalent to $236–245 million in 2025) Government Center still needed final city approval, and the funds at hand were sufficient only for the federal building's planning and design.

In late 1960, the BRA had agreed to sell the GSA a 136,500-square-foot (12,680 m^{2}) site. As partial compensation, the GSA offered to swap its as-yet-unsold Back Bay site with the BRA; the state legislature approved the land swap in May 1961. Pei's revised site plan was approved the next month, calling for six buildings. The federal building was to occupy an enlarged site of 200,000 square feet (4.6 acres; 1.9 ha) on New Sudbury Street; this site was formally known as Site 5. Logue began acquiring land that year through the early land acquisition program, which allowed some work to begin before the city approved the overall Government Center plan. The federal building site was acquired that October; this tract was to be among the first sites in Scollay Square to be cleared. Part of the federal building was to occupy the old alignment of Sudbury Street, requiring that site to be cleared first. The federal government paid the city $1.2 million for the land in March 1963. (Note: Equivalent to $10 million in 2025)

==== Design ====
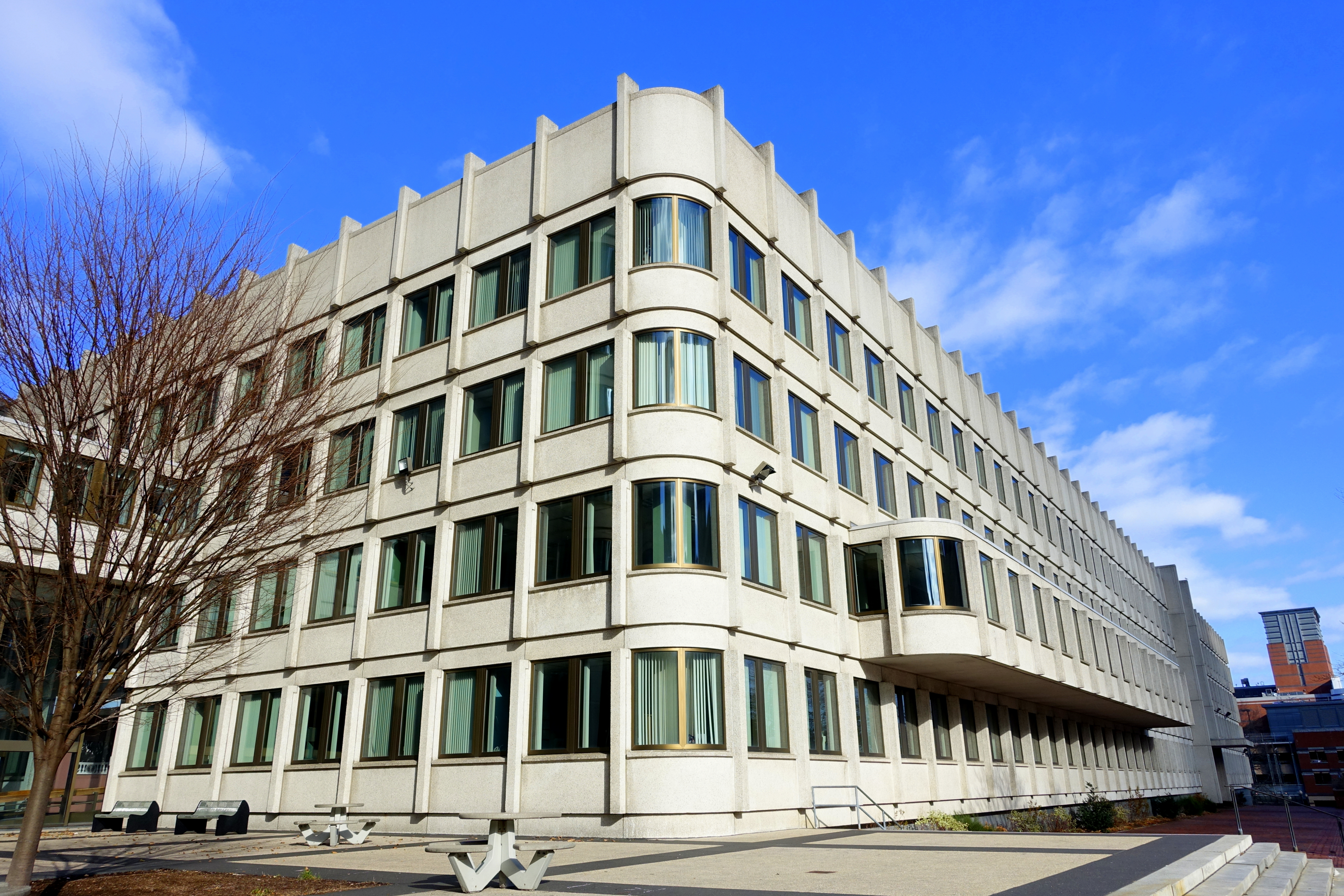
The low-rise wing

The GSA distributed questionnaires across Greater Boston to gauge architectural firms' interest in designing the federal building. In January 1961, Walter Gropius's firm The Architects Collaborative (TAC), along with Samuel Glaser Associates, were hired to design the building, receiving a $925,000 contract. (Note: Equivalent to $7,527,000 in 2025) Norman C. Fletcher, one of the TAC partners in charge, recalled that the architects did not have to send any formal documentation to the GSA, other than a Form 251 describing the firms' activities. Logue was reportedly pleased with the GSA's choice to hire TAC, even though he did not appreciate that the GSA acted as "a sovereign power" that could override parts of the BRA's master plan. Fletcher recalled that the GSA had nudged TAC toward partnering with Glaser, since that firm was proficient in creating architectural drawings.

After the GSA presented the architects with an axonometric diagram of the site, the architects began designing the building that March. The federal building was designed separately from Pei's master plan and, as such, contained several deviations from the master plan. TAC initially proposed a seven-story or eight-story building with a uniform height. This low-rise tower would have extended 700 feet (210 m) long—extending the length of the New Sudbury Street frontage—and about 300 feet (91 m) wide. Fletcher recalled that input from the GSA and from I. M. Pei associate Henry Cobb resulted in "improvements in the concept and design of the project". David Crane, the BRA consultant tasked with reviewing the plans (and one of Gropius's former Harvard University students), said that "GSA had imposed significant programmatic and budget constraints" that severely restricted TAC's design.

The plans were revised to conform to the GSA's requests and Pei's master plan. For example, the revised plans called for twin towers with a low-rise wing, similar to Pei's original proposal for a tower and low wing. The towers were moved from the site's eastern end to the western end so they did not become the focal point of Boston City Hall Plaza. The original plans called for protruding architectural elements on both the low-rise wing and the towers, but the protrusions on the tower were removed at the suggestion of Leonard Hunter, a design and construction executive who suggested that they were distracting. In May 1962, the GSA approved the final design, which called for twin 26-story office towers. The complex was to also have a four-story wing for local offices. The low-rise wing and the towers would be connected by an overpass, and all of the building's sections would be made of concrete. At the time, the structure was planned to house 12 federal agencies. The United States House of Representatives approved an $26,544,100 appropriation for the project in August 1962, (Note: Equivalent to $216,004,000 in 2025) which the United States Senate later increased to $28,893,000. (Note: Equivalent to $235,118,000 in 2025)

=== Construction ===
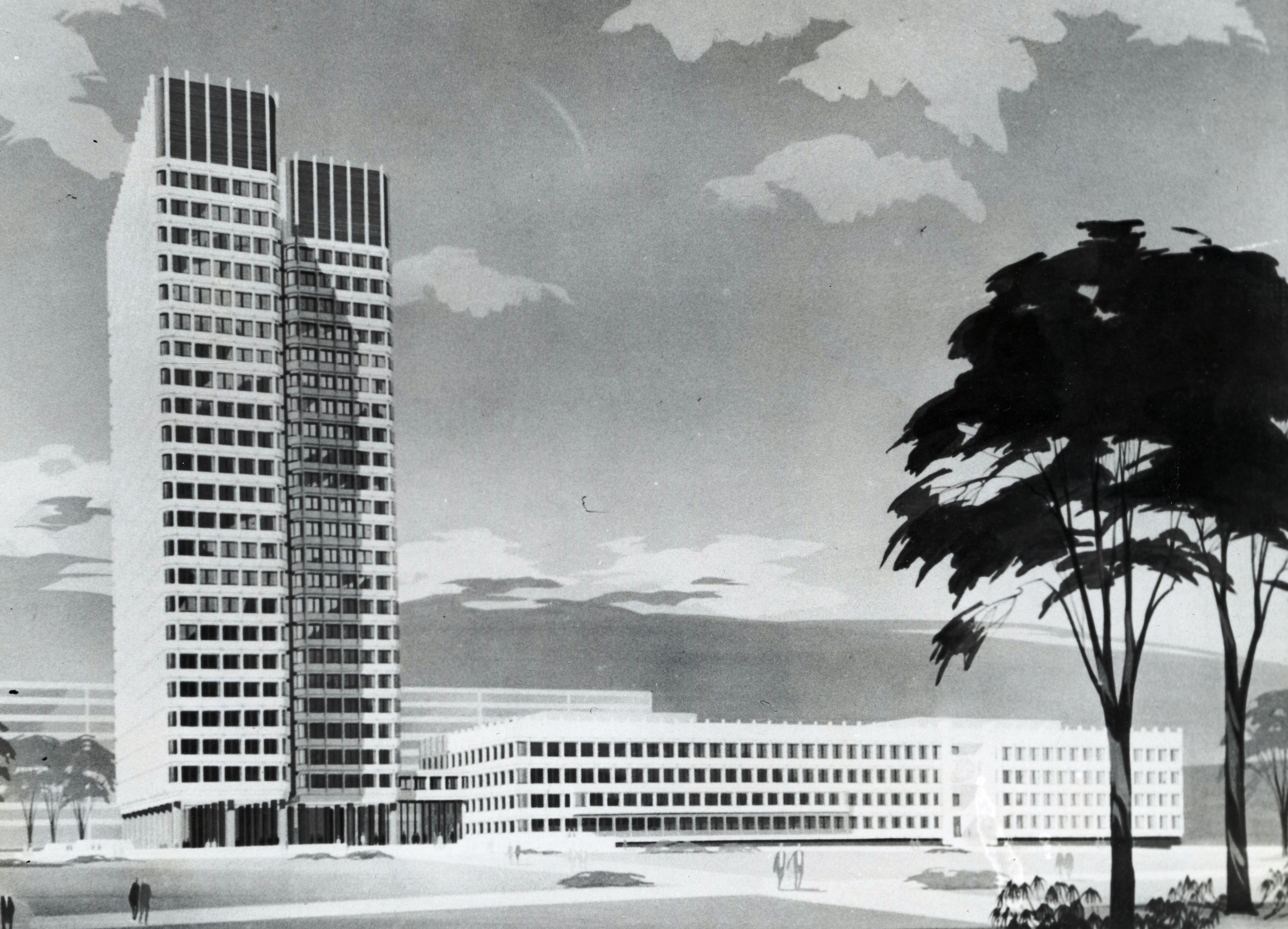
Architectural rendering (c. 1963)

A groundbreaking ceremony for the site took place on July 8, 1963. The Boston City Council had failed to approve the Government Center plan by then, even though the whole site had been cleared. The city's continued delays in approving Government Center frustrated GSA administrator Bernard L. Boutin, who said the federal government had only agreed on the Government Center site because of the understanding that city and state government structures would also be built there. After the assassination of President John F. Kennedy that November, various proposals were put forth to memorialize him across New England and the U.S. Among these were the federal building at Government Center, which House Speaker John McCormack (who represented South Boston) proposed for renaming. The federal building was renamed the John F. Kennedy (JFK) Federal Building in December 1963; at that point, work on the foundation was underway. The condition of the land beneath Government Center was highly irregular; although the material under the Federal Building was sturdy enough to carry the building's concrete-mat foundation, adjacent buildings had to be built on deep piles.

The above-ground portion of the building's steel frame had reached the eighth floor by April 1964, and the overall Government Center plan was approved that September. Later that year, construction was delayed when the GSA halted the delivery of defective concrete facade panels, which had to be re-cast. The concrete panels were being installed on the facade by mid-1965. The JFK Federal Building was one of four Government Center structures underway at the time, along with City Hall, the State Office Building, and One Center Plaza. By later that year, the low-rise wing was supposed to be finished at the end of 1965, followed the next year by the tower. The entire building was completed by mid-1966. The JFK Federal Building was completed substantially under budget; its cost was variously cited as $22 million, $24 million, $25 million, or $27 million. (Note: Equivalent to $166.5–204.4 million in 2025)

The estimated cost savings of $3 million (Note: Equivalent to $22.7 million in 2025) was used to finance public artwork, although the artwork was not approved until Kennedy's death. Gropius suggested three artworks: a mural by Robert Motherwell, a sculpture by Herbert Ferber, and reliefs by Costantino Nivola. In 1965, Motherwell was commissioned to create the abstract mural New England Elegy, which was finished the next year to much controversy. Observers believed the work depicted Kennedy's assassination, though Motherwell denied these claims. The controversy had distressed Motherwell, who facetiously said the work should be retitled "New England Composition with Elegiac Feelings", and the federal government's fine arts program was paused briefly in part because of the New England Elegy controversy. Ferber designed the sculpture Full Circle: Profile in Courage, which was ultimately dedicated in 1968, after the building's completion. After the federal government rejected Gropius's suggestion to hire Nivola, Gropius nominated Mirko Basaldella, who was also rejected because he did not hold American citizenship. The government ultimately accepted the nomination of Modern abstract artist Dimitri Hadzi, whose work Gropius had previously seen at the Massachusetts Institute of Technology. Over three years, Hadzi produced a bronze sculpture called Thermopylae, which was dedicated in 1966.

=== 1960s to early 1980s ===
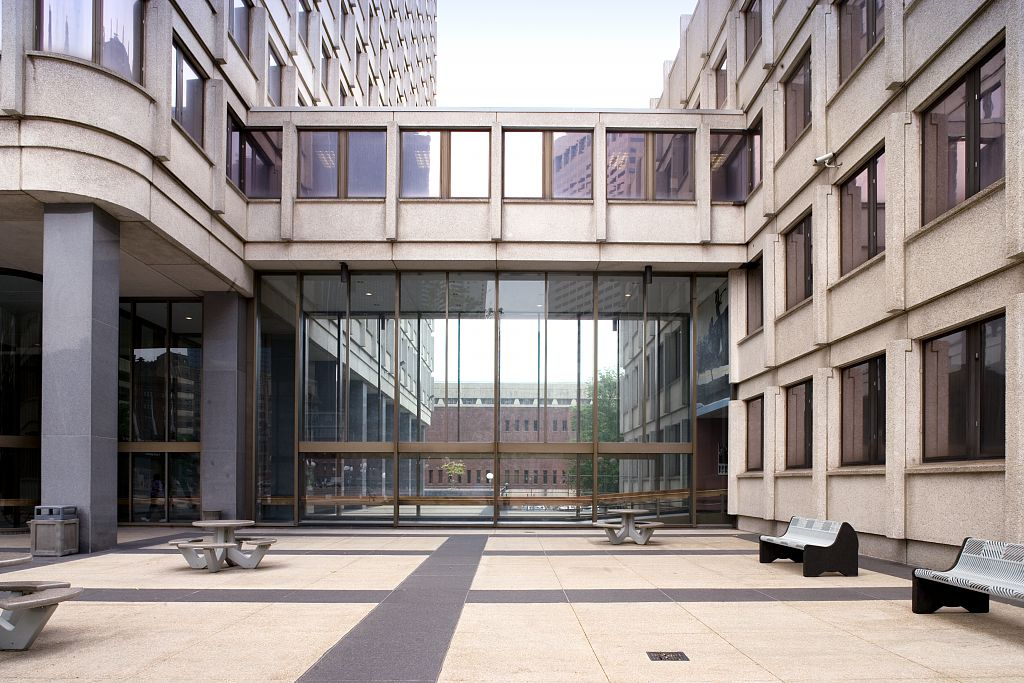
The connector between the low-rise building and the towers

The building was dedicated on September 9, 1966, before a crowd of 5,000 people. John F. Kennedy's brother Robert F. Kennedy spoke at the ceremony, and other members of the Kennedy family attended, though his widow Jacqueline and their children were absent. The ceremony hardly mentioned the building, and Gropius was not called upon to speak at the ceremony, despite the federal government having invited him to speak there. The building could accommodate up to 4,000 employees and, at the time of completion, was nearly fully occupied. Among the building's first occupants were the regional Social Security office, the Internal Revenue Service, and the regional Veterans Administration office. The completion of the JFK Building and other governmental buildings nearby spurred interest in smaller development sites in the area. The US Service Assistance Center, an office that assisted recently-discharged veterans, opened at the JFK Building in 1968.

Early modifications were confined to the facade and plazas. The facility was already overcrowded by 1970, when the Social Security office moved out. The federal government opened a general-interest bookstore at the JFK Federal Building that year, and it opened an exhibit about Kennedy's legacy in the lobby in 1972. Around that time, the GSA repaired the roof, which had been leaking almost since the building's opened. In the early 1970s, the building was also the subject of anti-war protests and demonstrations against Boston school bus desegregation. The lobby's original ceramic ceiling was replaced during that decade. In the years after the building's completion, the interior spaces were repeatedly overhauled.

The JFK Building had not been constructed with fire alarms, loudspeaker systems, or sprinklers, since federal buildings were exempted from state and city fire-safety codes; at the time, federal law did not require any of these equipment. In 1977, the GSA installed a fire alarm system throughout the building, but the system triggered so many false alarms that it was eventually deactivated completely. The roof also leaked frequently even after the early-1970s repairs, requiring the installation of gutters as a stopgap measure. The Department of Health, Education and Welfare (HEW) had renovated its offices in the 1970s with expensive material such as teakwood, prompting the GSA to accuse the HEW of mismanagement. Two whistleblowers at the GSA separately tried to raise concerns about potential corruption regarding modifications to the building, but they were instead fired. In 1978, auditors at the GSA's main office corroborated these claims, finding numerous contracts at the JFK Federal Building that lacked proper documentation, including contracts that were improperly certified when the work had not even been completed. After these allegations came to light, the GSA's main office investigated the Boston office for misconduct. The city government notified the GSA in 1981 that the building had inadequate fire alarm systems or evacuation procedures; the building experienced a minor elevator fire a few days afterward, during which it took 35 minutes to evacuate the building's staff. By then, the GSA said it was designing a new fire-alarm system. Several accessibility upgrades also were undertaken starting in 1980.

=== Mid-1980s to 1990s ===
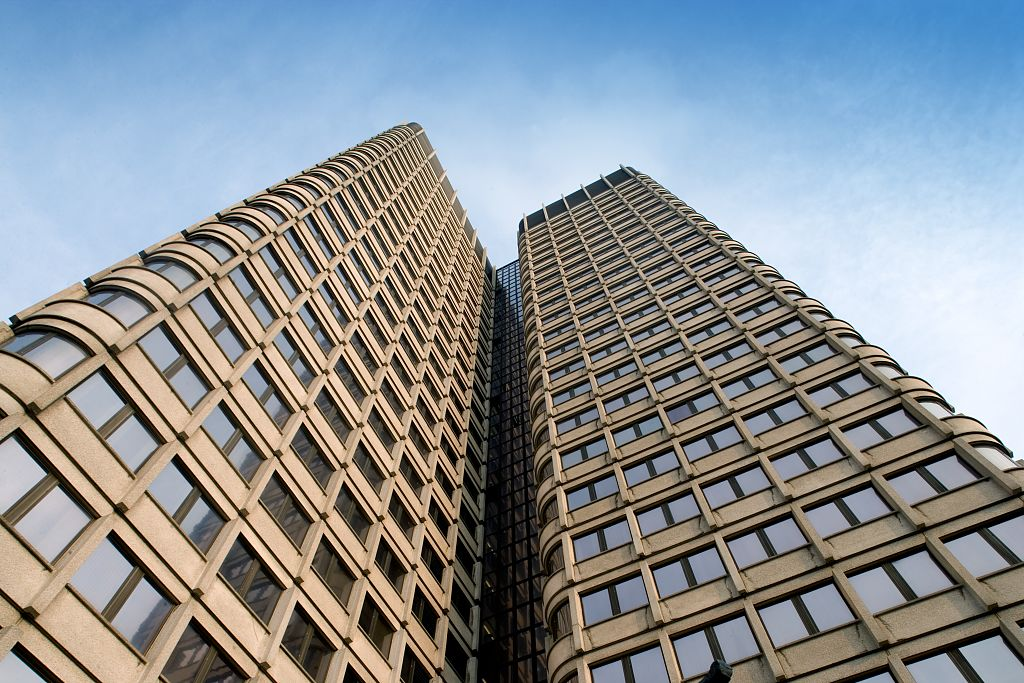
View from ground level

When an adjacent city-owned garage was sold in 1983 to a developer, the GSA sued to prevent the sale from being finalized, citing an agreement from Government Center's construction. This agreement, one of the federal government's preconditions for constructing the JFK Building, had required the city to obtain the GSA's permission for any redevelopment of the garage. The federal government lost the lawsuit. The windows were replaced in 1985, and the elevators, entrance doors, and restrooms were all overhauled in the late 1980s. The United States Environmental Protection Agency, which had its regional headquarters at the building, moved its Waste Management division offices to a nearby building in 1987, following discovery of toxic asbestos at the JFK Building. By the end of the decade, the building's exterior had become grimy, and the interiors were in need of upgrades. Although both state and federal regulations required sprinkler systems in other high-rises, the JFK Federal Building lacked sprinklers, unlike all other federal buildings in Boston. Fire-safety deficiencies persisted; when the basement caught fire in 1988, causing $100,000 in damage, (Note: Equivalent to $235,000 in 2025) it took 45 minutes to evacuate the upper floors, and disabled workers had to be carried downstairs. The GSA estimated at the time that the building needed about $55 million in upgrades, (Note: Equivalent to $129.0 million in 2025) including sprinkler systems.

By the 1990s, the building had 3,000 employees from about a dozen agencies, and approximately half of the employees were affiliated with the National Treasury Employees Union. A new federal courthouse (later to become the John Joseph Moakley United States Courthouse) was proposed in the late 1980s. The roof of the JFK Building's low-rise wing was suggested as a site for the courthouse, which was instead built on Boston Harbor. The JFK Building was renovated during the 1990s for $70 million, (Note: Equivalent to $128.8 million in 2025) with asbestos abatement comprising about a third of the cost. The upper floors were renovated first, and the project was undertaken floor by floor, drawing out the process. Sprinklers were also added, and the lobbies and some other interior spaces were also overhauled. During the renovation, a wooden cooling tower on the roof caught fire in 1991, causing $1 million in damage. (Note: Equivalent to $2.1 million in 2025) After the fire, the federal Occupational Safety and Health Administration (OSHA) found 21 building-code deficiencies. OSHA's findings included narrow staircases, ineffective fire doors that had holes or were kept open, fire-retardant equipment with holes, and missing equipment. The renovations were completed in 1995, and security precautions at the JFK Building were increased following the Oklahoma City bombing that year.

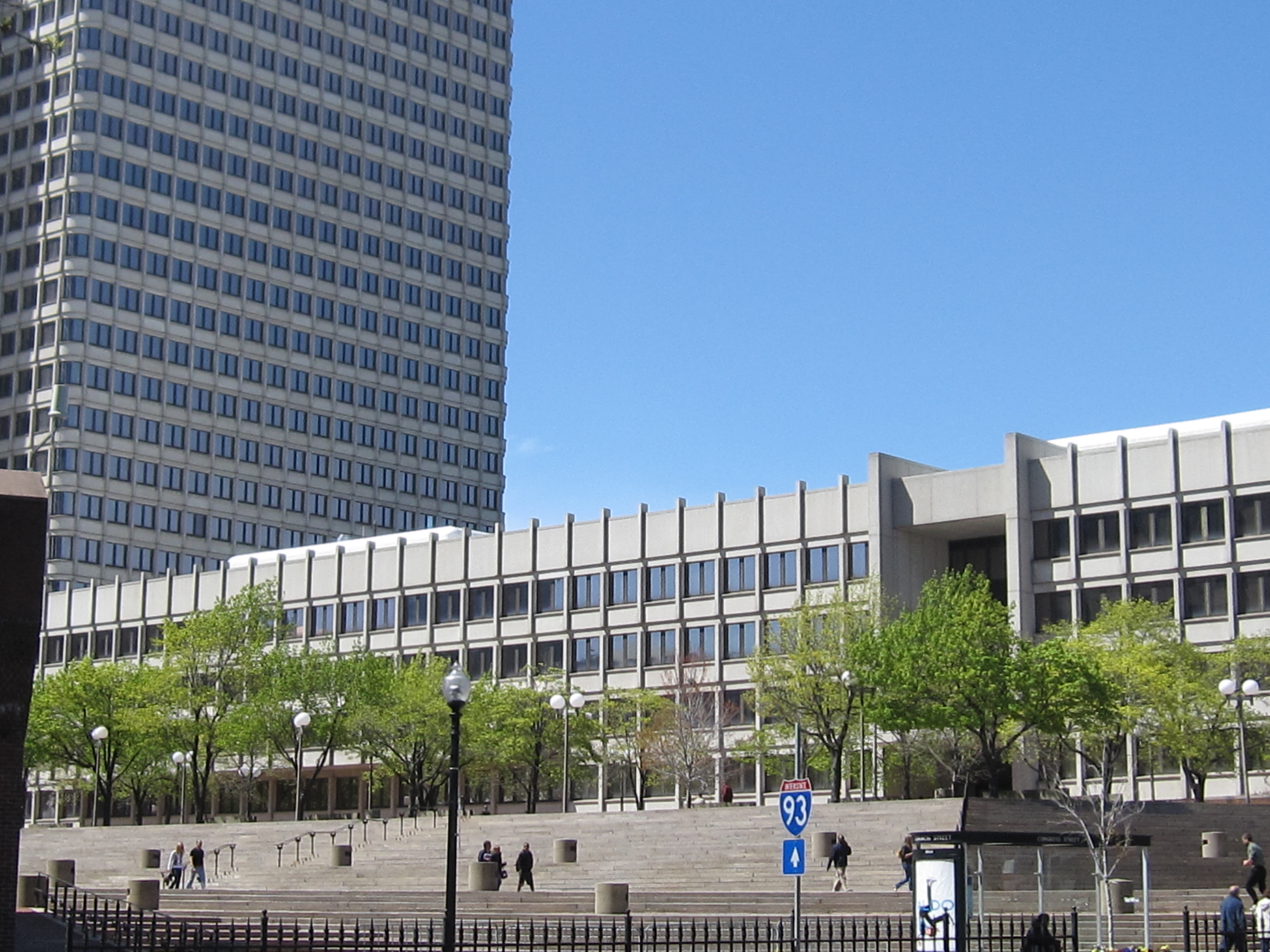
The low-rise section (seen here in 2010) was proposed for demolition in the late 1990s.

In 1996, the Trust for City Hall Plaza, a group tasked with devising plans for the renovation of City Hall Plaza, proposed constructing a hotel on the plaza. These plans elicited public criticism and spurred objections from the GSA. Among the GSA's objections were that the hotel would be only 31 feet (9.4 m) from the plaza, potentially creating security issues and blocking the JFK Building's views and natural light exposure. The plans were classified as minor modifications to Government Center, and as such needed BRA approval, but GSA officials successfully petitioned the Boston City Council to review the hotel plan as well, claiming that it was a major modification. The GSA also threatened lawsuits against the hotel. To alleviate federal concerns, in 1998, city and federal officials considered a compromise in which the JFK Building's low-rise wing would be demolished to provide space between the remaining towers and the hotel. At the time, the low-rise section included a childcare center and several federal agencies; were the low-rise wing to be demolished, some employees would have to relocate to the John W. McCormack Post Office and Courthouse. The federal government still hesitated at this proposal. The planned City Hall Plaza hotel was canceled in 1999, when Mayor Thomas Menino announced a renovation of the plaza, which included adding a park in front of the JFK Building. By then, a report on City Hall Plaza had recommended that the federal government should encourage activity in the relatively desolate area near the JFK Building, calling it the "worst edge on the plaza".

=== 2000s to present ===
In 2000, the GSA and the city proposed renovating the JFK Building. These proposals included enlarging the towers' lobby on Cambridge Street, creating a glass-walled meeting space under the pilotis, opening the New Sudbury Street drop-off loop to the public, and landscaping the southeastern elevation. Security was tightened again after the September 11 attacks in 2001, leading to the installation of bollards around the building. During the decade, the plaza was paved over, and the windows were tinted, giving them a rundown look. Proposals to sell the neighboring City Hall, in the late 2000s, again prompted concerns that a building could be constructed near the JFK Building. The plaza was still used as a parking lot in the 2010s, and the windows were replaced during that decade. The federal government proposed renovating the building in 2016 for $40 million, which would include adding energy-efficient mechanical systems and replacing the roof.

The building was added to the National Register of Historic Places on November 15, 2021, in part for its modernist architecture and its association with TAC. After the second presidency of Donald Trump began in 2025, the Trump administration began considering selling off the JFK Building, along with the Thomas P. O'Neill Jr. and John W. McCormack buildings. These plans were part of the administration's efforts to sell hundreds of federal properties, particularly modernist buildings such as the JFK Building and Chicago's Kluczynski Federal Building. At the time, the JFK Building held the offices of both of Massachusetts's U.S. Senators, Elizabeth Warren and Ed Markey. It also housed federal agencies including Citizenship and Immigration Services, Drug Enforcement Administration, and Internal Revenue Service.

== Selected tenants ==
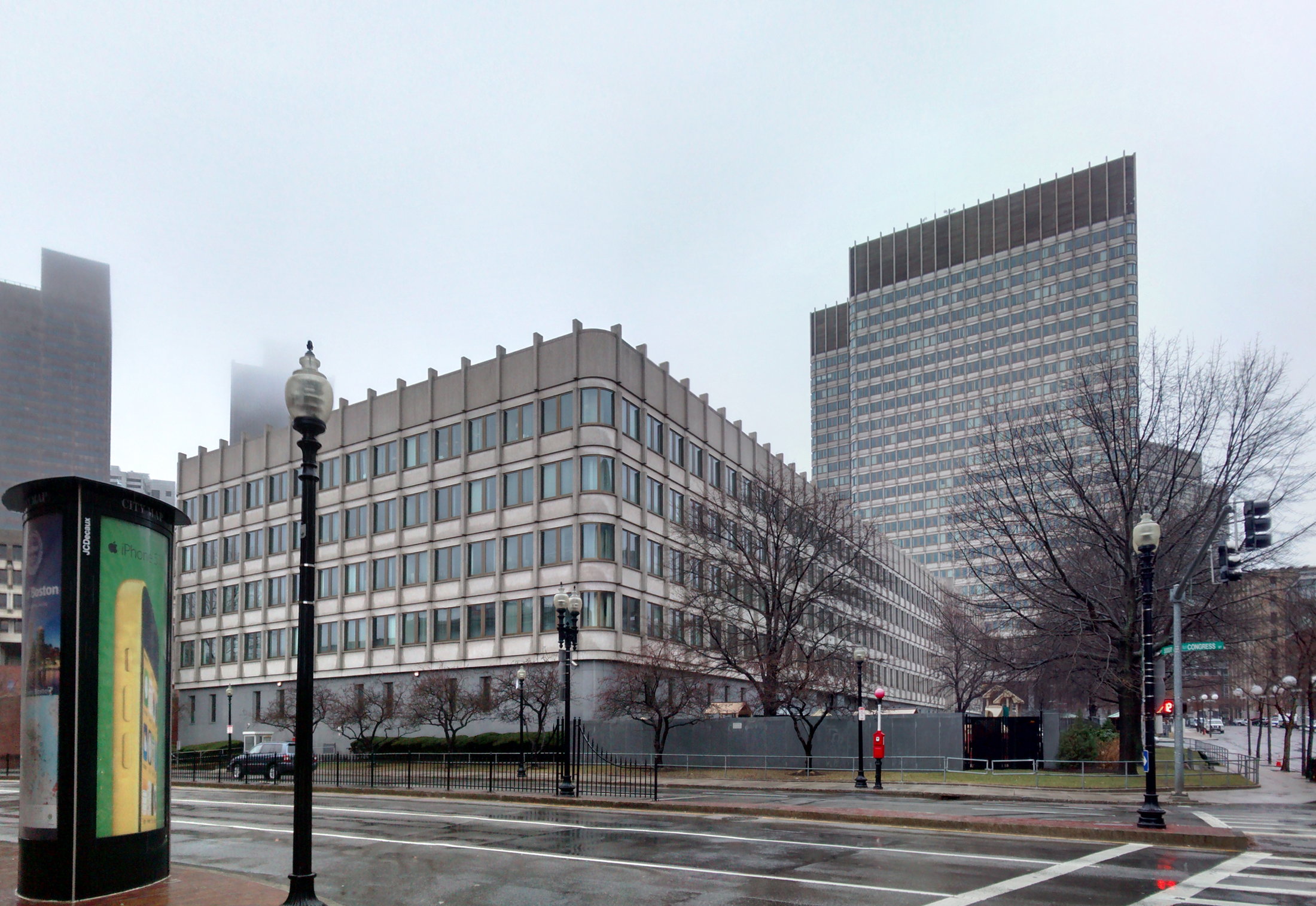
Seen from the northeast

As of 2026, the JFK Building's tenants included:

- Elizabeth Warren, U.S. Senator from Massachusetts
- Ed Markey, U.S. Senator from Massachusetts
- U.S. Citizenship and Immigration Services
- U.S. Department of Health & Human Services
- U.S. Department of Labor Regional Office
- U.S. Department of Veterans Affairs
- U.S. Immigration Court
- U.S. Internal Revenue Service
- U.S. Social Security Administration
- U.S. Homeland Security Investigations
- U.S. Drug Enforcement Administration

== Reception ==
When the building was under construction, a writer for The Boston Globe called it "the graceful centerpiece of the magnificent civic, business and residential cluster arising from the ashes of Scollay Sq.", namely Government Center. At the building's dedication, the Globe referred it as "a magnificent Boston memorial in the right location". Charles W. Eliot of The Christian Science Monitor wrote that, in response to claims that the building did not interfere with the new City Hall's design, "some might be inclined to reply: 'How could it?'". The Architectural Review, in response to the building's use of precast concrete, called the design "a pallid exercise in precasting". Observers also criticized the JFK Federal Building—along with other buildings at Government Center except City Hall—as middling. In a 1968 article for The Hudson Review, Charles W. Millard described the JFK Federal Building's massing as its most interesting feature and said that, despite Gropius's skill as an educator, the design "leaves one with serious reservations about Gropius' ultimate stature as an architect". The next year, Alan Murray of Fusion called the building "a dreadful disappointment" that represented a dated vision of the future, regarding the exterior corners as superfluous and the interiors as reminiscent of a bathroom.

The building continued to have mixed reception after its completion. The design of the low-rise wing, which separated City Hall Plaza from neighborhoods to the north, was singled out for particular disdain. In 1972, the critic Ada Louise Huxtable regarded the building as a mediocre work that was already experiencing the "American disease of instant deterioration", criticizing in particular the exterior detail and Motherwell's mural. She did praise the massing as an innovative means of allowing sunlight into the building. Architectural writers Francesco Dal Co and Manfredo Tafuri regarded TAC's architectural skill as having reached a nadir in the building's design, and Ian Menzies of the Globe described the JFK Building as "a sterile, multi-story box".

A writer for The Brandeis Review said in 1988 that the building helped anchor City Hall Plaza, despite not being visually distinctive. David Crane of the Boston Redevelopment Authority (BRA) wrote that, because the building's right-angled floor plan is set back from the curved streets surrounding it, the structure's massing did "not forcefully define the north wall of City Hall Plaza". Crane also did not consider the pilotis a particularly strong design element, evoking Louis Kahn's complaints that such buildings were "like an elephant standing on tiptoe in ballet shoes". A 2003 article in The Beacon Hill Times regarded the JFK Building as a blight on the plaza, saying that "the building mocks the martyred president. It does not memorialize him." Paul McMorrow wrote for the Globe that the JFK Building demonstrated that Gropius "could design terrible, oversized floor plates like any other mercenary".

== Gallery ==
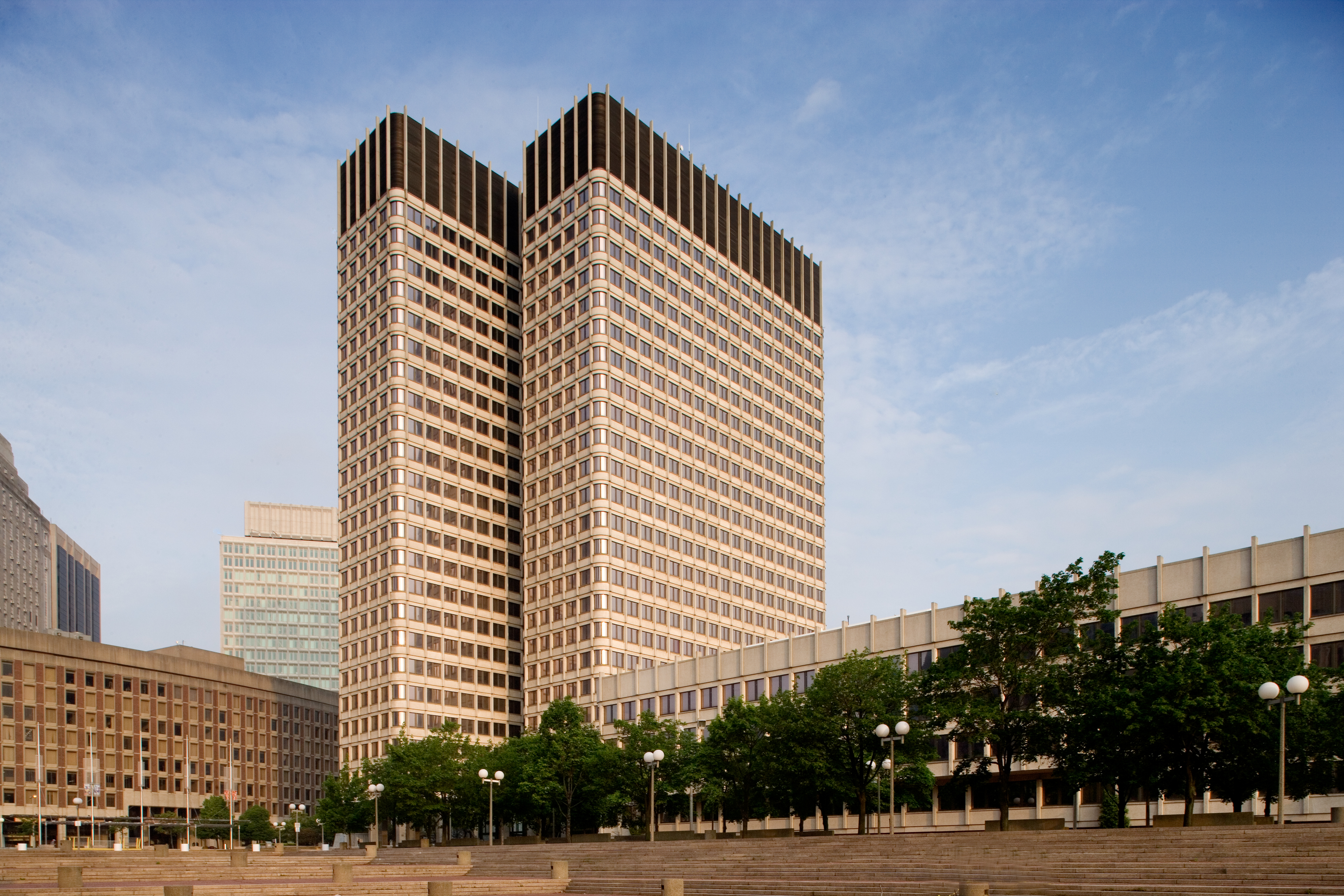
View of the tower section from afar

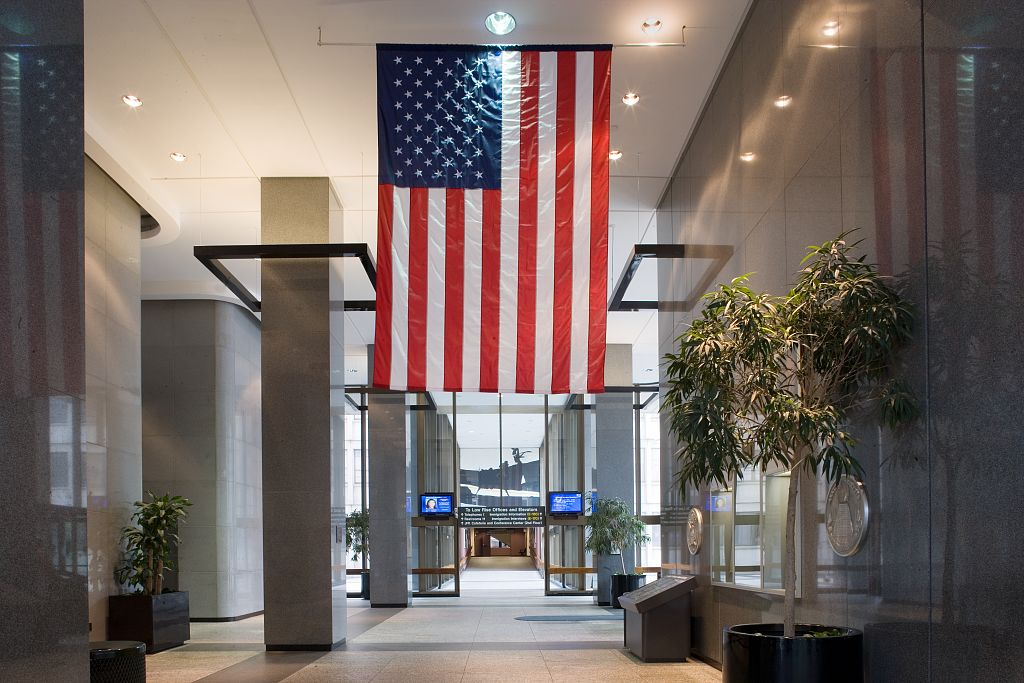
Lobby

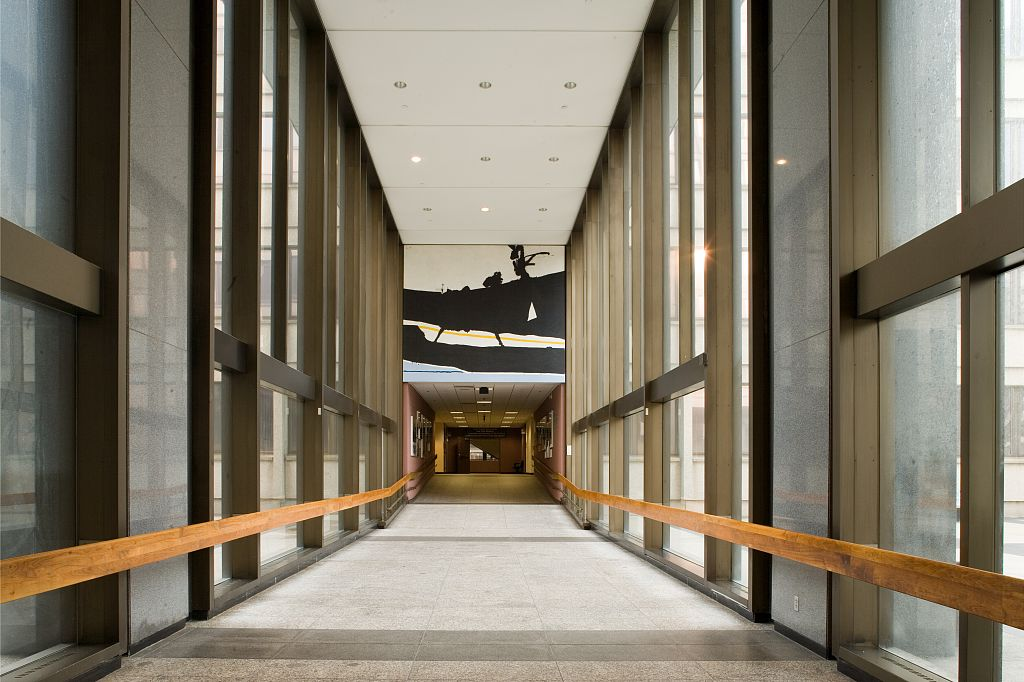
Interior

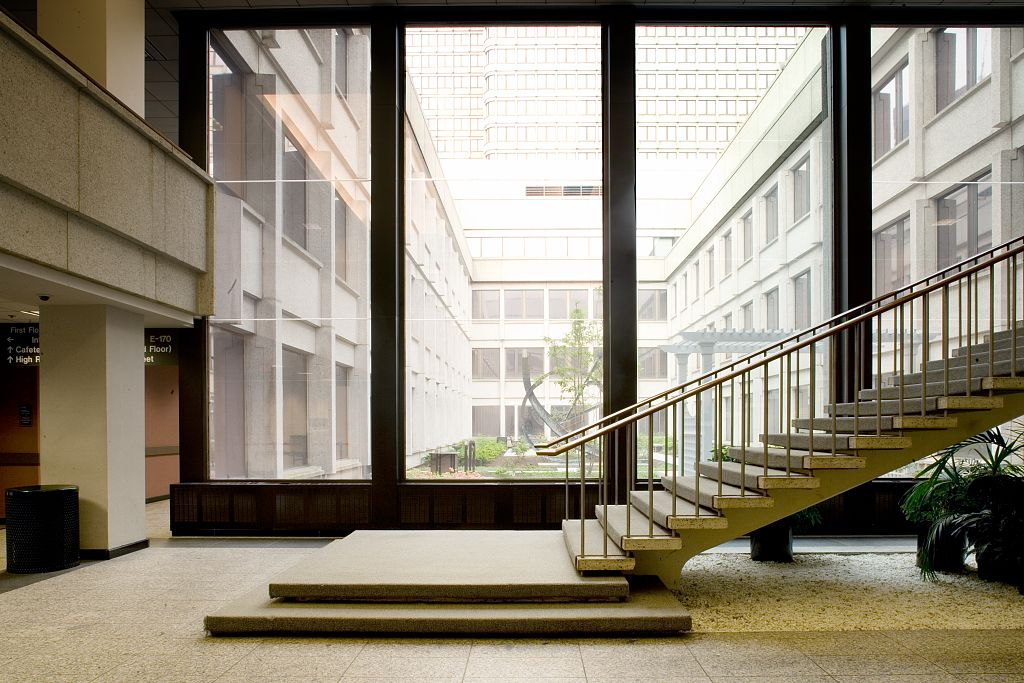
Interior staircase

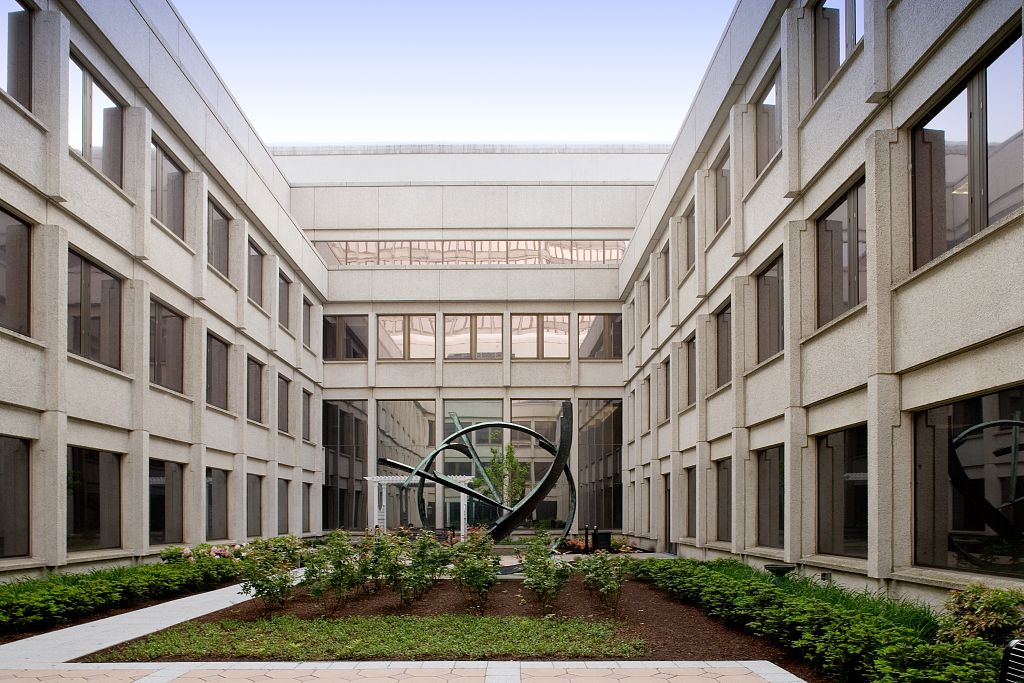
Courtyard

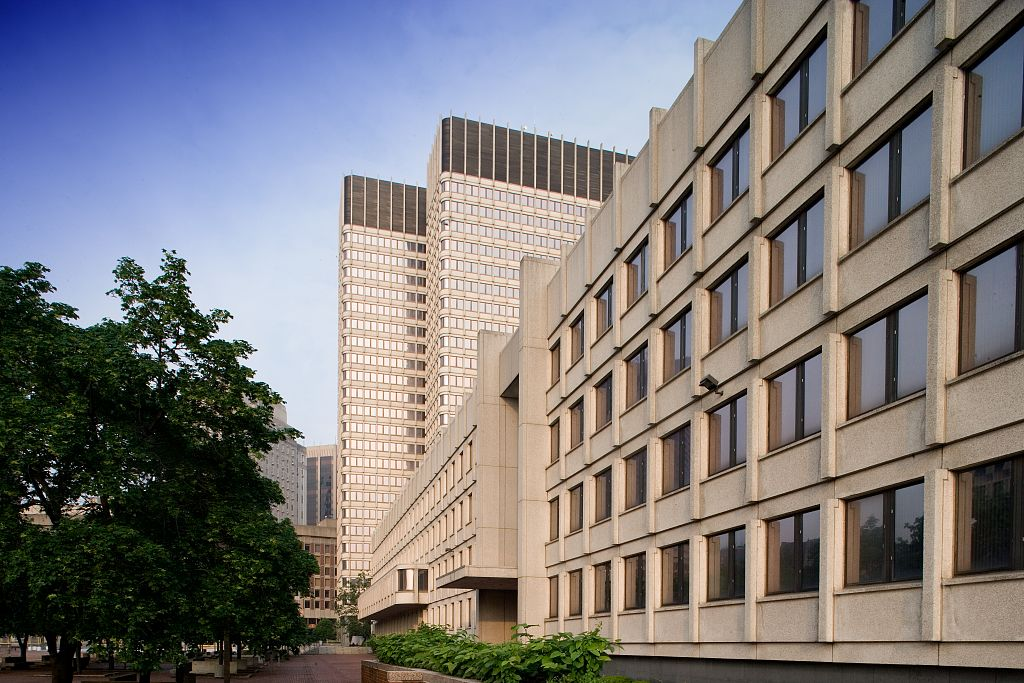
Plaza view

== See also ==
- American House (Boston), demolished 19th-century building that stood on the site of the JFK Federal Building
- Hanover Street (Boston), partially demolished street that stood on the site of the JFK Federal Building
- List of courthouses in Boston
- List of memorials to John F. Kennedy
- National Register of Historic Places listings in northern Boston
