= LearnShare =

Defunct American software company that produced a learning management system

LearnShare LLC
- Company type: Subsidiary
- Industry: Software
- Founded: 1996; 30 years ago
- Founder: Consortium of major US corporations
- Defunct: 2016
- Fate: Acquired
- Successor: UL (safety organization)
- Headquarters: Maumee, Ohio, United States
- Area served: United States
- Key people: Rob Houck, Randy Consolo (CTO)
- Products: Learning Management System, talent management, vocational training
- Parent: UL (safety organization)
- Website: www.ul.com/software/ultrus/learning-management-system

LearnShare was an American software company based at the Arrowhead Business Park in Maumee, Ohio. The company provided human resource software that includes its core product, a learning management system (LMS) for businesses.

The company was acquired in 2016 by UL Solutions and the LearnShare LMS software continues as a brand under UL Solutions.

LearnShare was founded in September 1996 as a consortium by major US companies that included 3M, John Deere, General Motors, among others.

== History ==
=== Foundation and early years 1995-2000 ===
In October 1995, Rick Corry of Owens Corning invited 18 non-competing companies to discuss the formation of a collaborative training consortium. These companies then established a limited liability company.

In September 1996, four more companies joined the consortium, including Chevron and Northwest Airlines.

Each company contributed $100,000 a year for 2 years and received a seat on the board of directors. The Board also had three non-voting members from various universities.

LearnShare LLC started as a service organization that developed multi-media and distance learning technologies. The purpose was for member companies to share existing materials and expertise. The consortium would then develop technology-based training at the lowest possible cost for member companies.

Through 2000, LearnShare was funded by its founding members. Starting in 2001, the consortium hired Lois Webster from Motorola as the CEO/General Manager of LearnShare to move the company to a for-profit company.

=== Sustaining members 2000-2007 ===
In 2001, LearnShare accepted "sustaining members" in 2-year agreements. Since that time, 40 additional corporations joined the consortium which now represents more than 2.5 million employees.

In 2002, UnitedHealth Group purchased ownership in LearnShare and joined the Board of Management. Also in that year, LearnShare's LMS was fully functional.

LearnShare created agreements with third-party suppliers of courseware for pay-as-you access through the learning management system. LearnShare offered third party courses at the price of one course at a time.

=== Software expansion 2007–2016 ===
In 2007 LearnShare expanded its software system with modules in areas such as Performance Management and Employee Profiles. It also added the capability to the Learning Management System to integrate virtual classroom training.

In 2008, LearnShare became a management-owned company. In 2009, it added an online conversion tool to change PowerPoint presentations to e-learning courses. It also added modules for Performance Management, Succession, and Social Collaboration and Learning.

=== New ownership 2016 ===
In 2016, LearnShare was acquired by UL Pure Learning.

== See also ==
- e-learning
- Learning Management System
- Performance Management
- Talent management
- Consortium
