= Vitro =

Mexican manufacturing company

Coordinates: 25.6490°N 100.3531°W

Vitro, S.A.B de C.V.
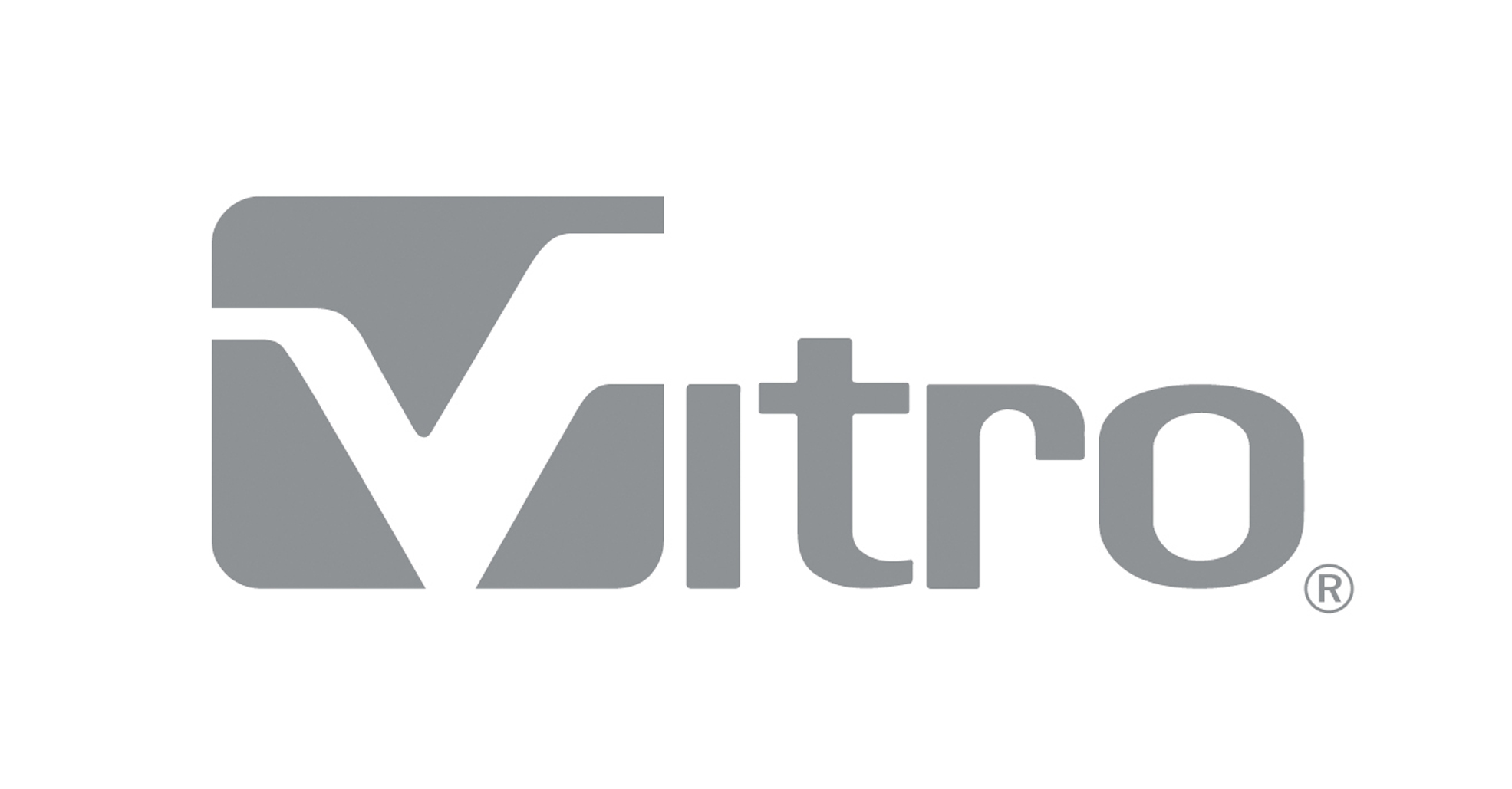
- Type: Public
- Traded as: BMV: VITRO A
- Industry: Glass
- Founded: 1909; 117 years ago
- Founder: Roberto G. Sada García
- Headquarters: Mexico Ricardo Margáin 400, Valle del Campestre, San Pedro Garza García, Nuevo León
- Area served: Worldwide
- Key people: Adrián G. Sada González (Chairman); Adrián G. Sada Cueva (CEO)
- Products: Glass containers, flat glass, float glass, automotive glass, chemicals, machinery, and equipment
- Revenue: US$ 2.1 billion (2016) Net Income       - US$400Million Employees = 15000
- Website: Vitro.com

Vitro is the largest glass producer in Mexico and one of the world's largest organizations in the glass industry. Founded in 1909 in Monterrey, Mexico, this corporation has 30 subsidiaries in Mexico, United States, Brazil, Colombia, Bolivia, Costa Rica, Guatemala and Panama.

Its companies produce, distribute, and market a wide range of glass articles, which are part of the daily life of millions of people in 34 countries in the Americas, Europe and Asia. It was founded by Roberto Sada Muguerza in 1909. It is one of the world's largest glass producers. In 2015 it sold its part of glass bottles to Owens Illinois for $2.15 billion. Vitro now focuses on producing flat glass. In July 2016, Vitro purchased PPG Industries' flat glass business for $750 million.

== North American plants ==
Vitro's website states that they have plants near the following North American cities:

- Carlisle, Pennsylvania
- Meadville, Pennsylvania
- Wichita Falls, Texas
- Fresno, California
- Garcia, Monterrey, Mexico
- Mexicali, Mexico
