= Propylaea (sculpture) =

Sculpture by Dimitri Hadzi

Coordinates: 41°39′11″N 83°31′52″W

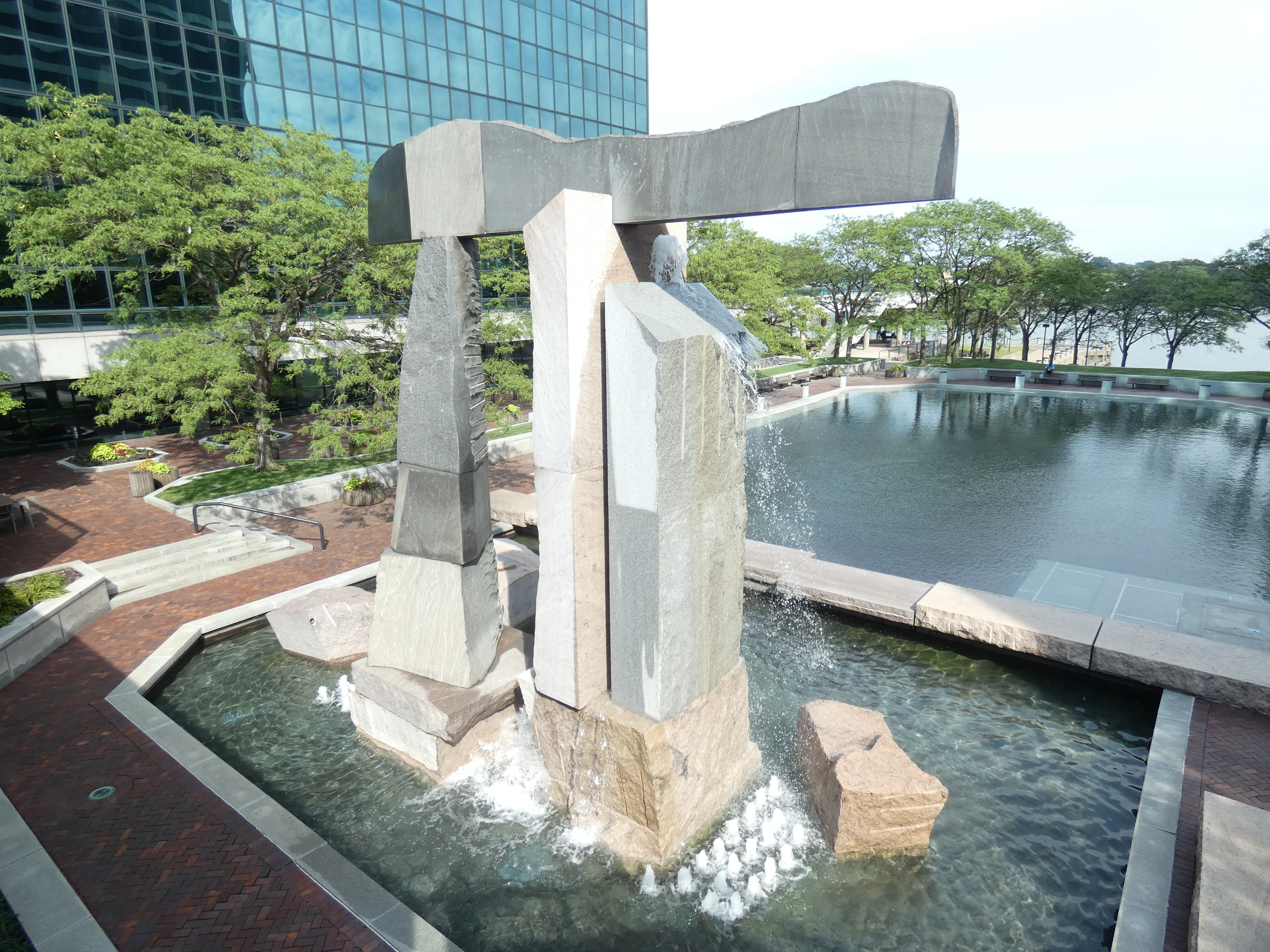
- The sculpture at One Seagate
- Artist: Dimitri Hadzi
- Year: 1982; 43 years ago
- Medium: Granite
- Location: Toledo, Ohio

Propylaea is a sculpture/fountain on the Maumee River, in downtown Toledo, Ohio.

== About ==
In the early 1980s, Owens-Illinois was building their new world headquarters at One SeaGate. As a gift to the city, the company commissioned Dimitri Hadzi to design a sculpture to stand as the centerpiece of the SeaGate complex. The sculpture is made from granite, and is nestled as a fountain on a reflecting pond between One and Two SeaGate. Dimitri Hadzi described the use of water in the sculpture as a way of creating activity in the flat lands of Ohio.

== Dedication ==
Next to the sculpture there is a dedication which reads:

PROPYLAEA
1980–82
DIMITRI HADZI, SCULPTOR
AMERICAN B. 1921
THIS GRANITE SCULPTURE NAMED FROM THE GREEK WORD
FOR "GATEWAY," WAS COMMISSIONED BY OWENS-ILLINOIS TO STAND
AS A SYMBOLIC ENTRANCE TO SEAGATE AND A REVITALIZED TOLEDO.
HISTORICALLY, TOLEDO HAS BEEN A GATEWAY TO EXPLORATION, INVENTION
TRANSPORTATION AND INDUSTRY THAT HAS HELPED TO FORGE OUR NATION,
AND THE PROMISE OF ITS FUTURE IS TYPIFIED IN SEAGATE.

== See also ==
- One SeaGate
- Owens-Illinois
