= Battle of Thermopylae (disambiguation) =

The Battle of Thermopylae was a battle fought in 480 BC during the Persian Wars.

Battle of Thermopylae may also refer to:

- Battle of Thermopylae (323 BC), a battle during the Lamian War between a coalition of Greek cities under Leosthenes and a Macedonian army led by Antipater
- Battle of Thermopylae (279 BC), the defense of the pass by the Greeks during Brennus' invasion of Greece
- Battle of Thermopylae (191 BC), an important battle where Roman forces defeated the Seleucid King Antiochus III the Great
- Battle of Thermopylae (254), the successful defense of the pass by local forces during an invasion of the Balkans by the Goths
- Battle of Thermopylae (1941), fought between the Germans and the retreating ANZACs during the German invasion of Greece

== See also ==
- The 353 BC blocking of the pass during the Third Sacred War by the Phocian allied Athenians against Philip II of Macedon
- Battle of Alamana (1821), near Thermopylae during the Greek War of Independence
- Thermopylae (disambiguation)
