= Thermopylae (sculpture) =

Sculpture in Boston, Massachusetts, U.S.

- The sculpture at night in 2019
- Artist: Dimitri Hadzi
- Year: 1966
- Medium: Bronze sculpture
- Location: Boston, Massachusetts, U.S.
- 42°21′39.3″N 71°3′35.2″W

Thermopylae is a 1966 bronze sculpture by Dimitri Hadzi, installed at Boston City Hall Plaza near the John F. Kennedy Federal Building, in Boston's Government Center, in the U.S. state of Massachusetts.

== Description ==
The abstract sculpture is approximately 12 ft. tall and 16 ft. wide, and weighs 2.5 tons. It was commissioned by the commissioned by the General Services Administration and commemorates John F. Kennedy. A plaque reads:

"THERMOPYLAE" / DIMITRI HADZI, SCULPTOR / "THERMOPYLAE", WHICH IS A 12-FOOT HIGH, 2-1/2 TON BRONZE SCULPTURE, WAS INSPIRED, / "PROFILES IN COURAGE" AND THE BRILLIANT WAR RECORD OF PRESIDENT JOHN F. KENNEDY, / IT IS NAMED AFTER THE GREEK BATTLE WHERE THE SPARTANS, IN A DISPLAY OF GREAT / COURAGE, FOUGHT THE PERSIANS TO THE LAST MAN. / THOROUGHLY SYMBOLIC IN ITS ABSTRACT SHAPES, BASICALLY ORGANIC IN FORM, THE HEAVY / FORMS CONTRAST WITH THIN, SOLID WITH OPEN, VERTICAL WITH HORIZONTAL, AND ROUND / WITH ANGULAR. THROUGH THE EFFECT OF THE SUN, RAIN, AND SNOW ON THE SCULPTURE, / THE VIEWER IS PROVIDED WITH EVER CHANGING VISUAL AND EMOTIONAL EXPERIENCES.

The sculpture was surveyed by the Smithsonian Institution's "Save Outdoor Sculpture!" program in 1997.

== See also ==
- 1966 in art
