= Owens Corning =

American manufacturer of building materials

- Type: Public
- Traded as: NYSE: OC; S&P 400 component; Russell 1000 component
- Industry: General Building Materials, Composites
- Founded: 1938; 88 years ago in Toledo, Ohio, US
- Headquarters: Toledo, Ohio, US
- Key people: Brian Chambers (CEO)
- Products: Insulating systems; Composite solutions; Roofing and asphalt; Other building materials and services
- Revenue: ▲US$10.98 billion (2024)
- Operating income: ▼US$647 million (2024)
- Net income: ▼US$1.127 billion (2024)
- Total assets: ▲US$14.08 billion (2024)
- Total equity: ▼US$5.077 billion (2024)
- Number of employees: c. 25,000 (2024)
- Website: www.owenscorning.com/en-us

Owens Corning is an American company that develops and produces insulation, roofing, and fiberglass composites and related products. It is the world's largest manufacturer of fiberglass composites. It was formed in 1935 as a partnership between two major American glassworks, Corning Glass Works and Owens-Illinois. The company employs approximately 19,000 people around the world. Owens Corning has been a Fortune 500 company every year since the list was created in 1955. The Pink Panther is the company's mascot and appears in most of their advertisements.

== History ==
=== 1935–1980 ===
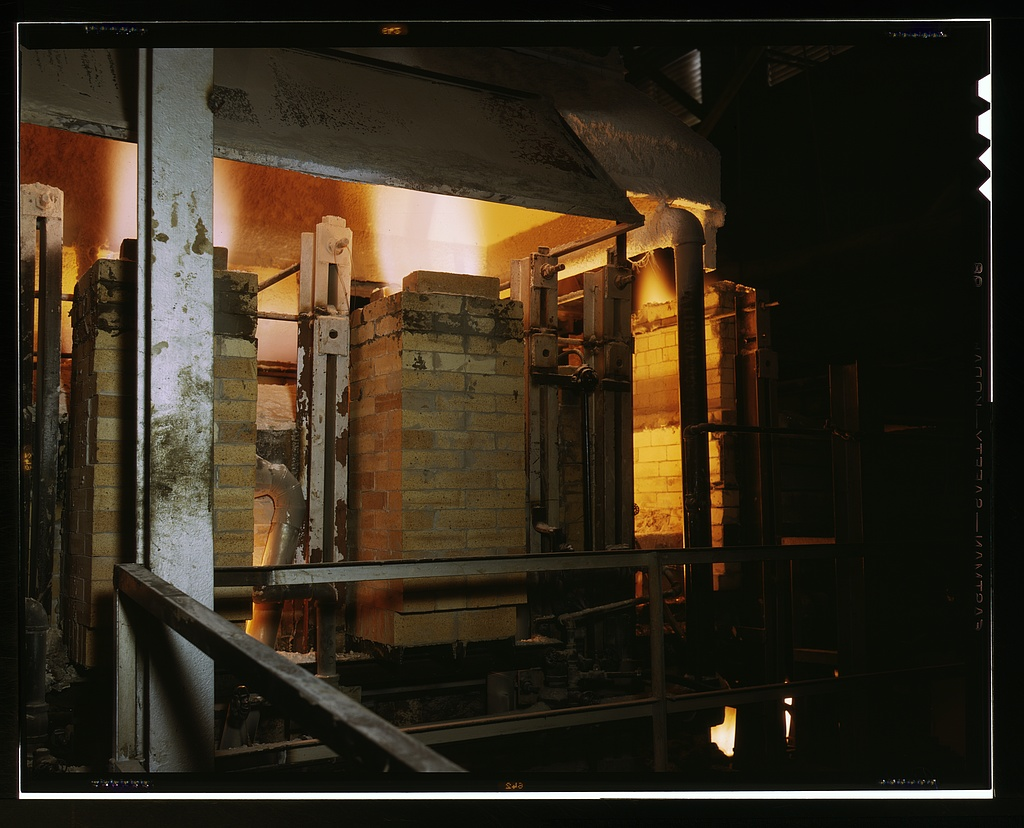
Fiberglass production in 1942

Owens-Corning Fiberglas Company was formed in 1935 through a joint venture of Owens-Illinois and Corning Glass Works. It became a separate company in 1938 with its headquarters established in Toledo, Ohio. In 1938, the company sales reached $2.6 million.

The company held its initial public offering on the New York Stock Exchange in 1952. In 1955, Owens-Corning purchased land for a research and testing facility near Granville, Ohio. Also in 1955, Owens-Corning made the first Fortune 500 company list. The company has been on the Fortune 500 list every year since its creation.

In 1965, Owens-Corning Fiberglas Europe was formed. In 1966, Owens-Corning established a partnership with Armstrong Rubber Co. to produce fiberglass-reinforced automobile tires. By 1971, Owens-Corning's annual revenue was over $500 million. In 1974, the company opened a temporary plant to produce insulation for the Trans-Alaska Pipeline System. In 1977, Owens-Corning acquired Frye Roofing and began production of fiberglass mat to replace traditional paper mat used in roofing. Owens-Corning sales surpassed $1 billion in 1976, and sales were over $2 billion by 1979.

In 1980, Owens Corning entered into a long-standing agreement with United Artists to use the Pink Panther as its brand mascot. "He has become an important part of our brand," said Christian Nolte, director of strategic marketing for the manufacturer of building materials and fiberglass. "The Pink Panther is as relevant today as he was over 25 years ago. He brings our trademark color pink to life."

=== Asbestos controversy ===
In 1978, two shipyard workers filed a class action lawsuit against which alleged that Owens-Corning and 14 other manufacturers had known about asbestos-containing products. Over the next three decades, the company was named in hundreds of thousands of asbestos lawsuits. By 2000, it had settled with 440,000 people who claimed Owens Corning's products caused them to develop asbestos-related illnesses such as mesothelioma.

=== 1981–present ===
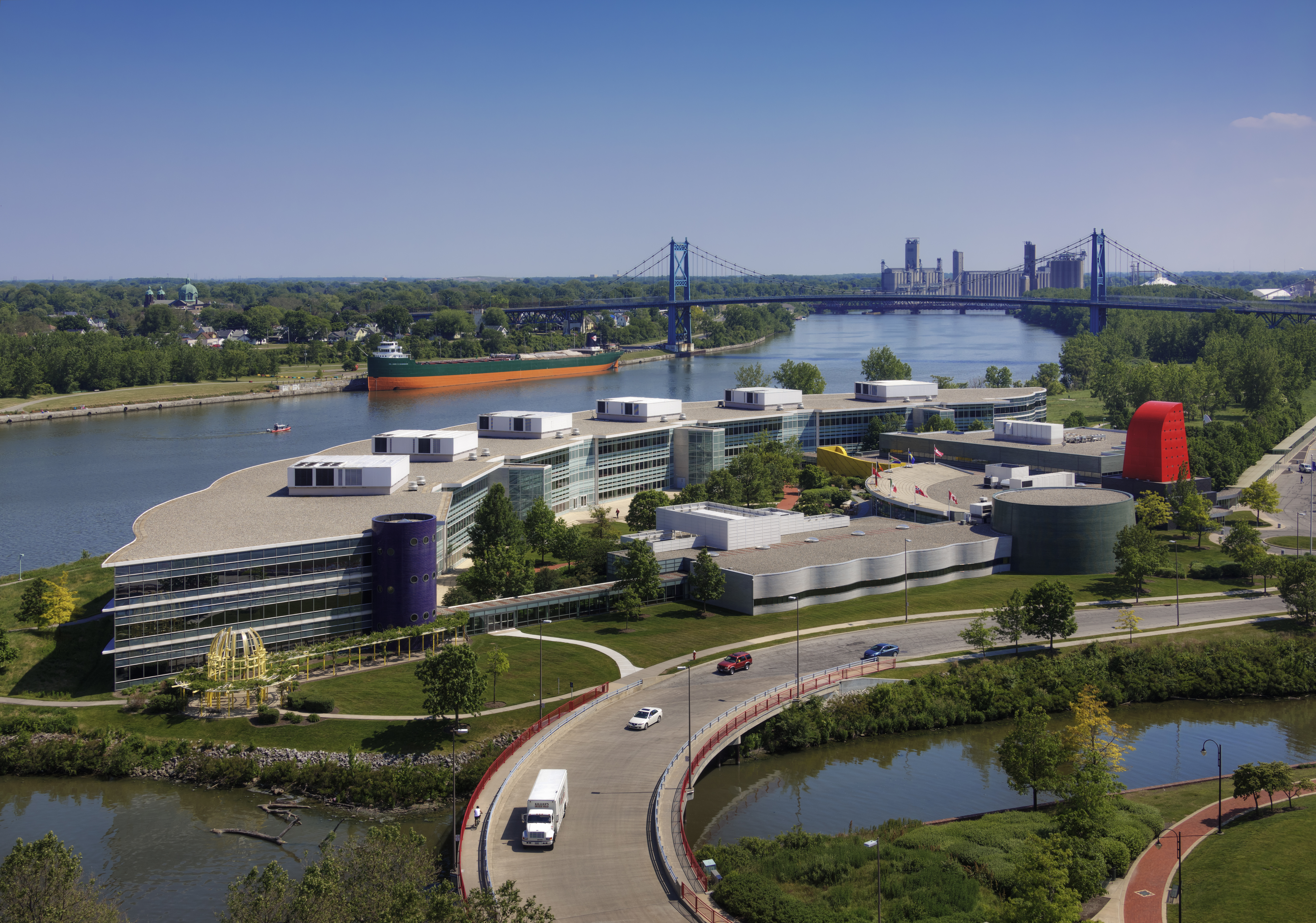
Owens Corning headquarters

In 1985, Owens-Corning acquired Aerospace and Strategic Metals Group in Newport Beach, California for $415 million from Armco Inc. The color PINK was trademarked through Owens-Corning in 1986, making it the first company to trademark a color.

The company opened an Asia/Pacific division in 1993. In May 1994, Owens-Corning acquired UC Industries, which produced Foamular polystyrene insulation, as a wholly owned subsidiary. In 1996, the company changed its name to Owens Corning. In May 1997, Owens Corning acquired Fibreboard Corporation, a vinyl siding and other industrial material manufacturer, which became a wholly owned subsidiary of Owens Corning. The company was ordered to pay $5 million to an asbestos victim in 1997, making it the highest jury verdict in the history of the United States for a single non-malignant asbestos case. In 1999, a jury in federal district court in Florida awarded $1.8 million compensatory damages and $31 million punitive damages against the company for asbestos products.

The company filed for Chapter 11 bankruptcy in 2000. In 2002, Owens Corning removed its shares from the New York Stock Exchange. In 2006, the company was listed on the New York Stock Exchange again under ticker "OC". In 2007, Owens Corning announced a joint venture with Saint-Gobain named OCV Reinforcements.

Owens Corning partnered with DuPont in 2011 to create a steel and foam energy reduction (SAFER) barrier around auto racetracks. In July 2015, the company announced it would be moving a manufacturing center for mineral wool insulation into an empty plant west of Joplin, Missouri.

In May 2024 the company completed the acquisition of Masonite International, a provider of interior and exterior door systems, for $3.9B. In 2026, Owens Corning announced the closure of its interior-door manufacturing plant in Walkerton, Indiana, a former Masonite facility, affecting approximately 130 employees.

== Products ==
In 1939, the US Navy Bureau of Ships made Owens-Corning insulation standard in new warship construction. Warship insulation, called Navy Board, was a permanent form-board insulation covered with woven continuous fiber cloth. Owens-Corning produced a prototype boat hull constructed of fiber glass-reinforced plastic in 1944.

In 1945, the company worked with an automaker to produce the first fiberglass-reinforced plastic car body. In 1953, General Motors used this type of body in the Chevrolet Corvette. In 1954, the company invented a process to make centrifugally-spun fiberglass wool, which became the standard process for producing fiberglass insulation.

In 1955, Owens-Corning introduced its Perma-Ply roofing material for built-up room insulation covering. The company created its first all fiber (AF) fiberglass wool in 1956. To distinguish its product, the company dyed their insulation pink by adding red dye to the AF wool. However, considering that the coloring made the insulation look pink, the company was concerned that the color would discourage the predominantly male-oriented market away from the material. As such, they decided to remove the coloring from their insulation, only to receive customer requests for the coloring to be restored. The company resumed the coloring in the face of such customer interest to the point of licensing the United Artists cartoon character the Pink Panther in 1979 as the product's mascot. Furthermore, the company trademarked the coloring in 1987, the first time a color was used for that purpose.

After the January 27, 1967, Apollo 1 fire which killed three astronauts, NASA worked with Owens-Corning and DuPont to develop beta cloth, a fireproof cloth of woven fiberglass coated with Teflon, as a replacement for the nylon outer layer of the Apollo/Skylab A7L space suit.

In February 2017, Owens Corning received the Asthma and Allergy Friendly certification for its Pure Safety high-performance insulation. "Owens Corning now joins a select group of manufacturers that are focused on product innovation to address people's exposure to allergens and irritants in their homes," said Julian Francis, president of insulation, Owens Corning.

At the TCT Show in Birmingham, the XStrand family of materials was introduced. These composites are used for 3D printing.

== Plants ==
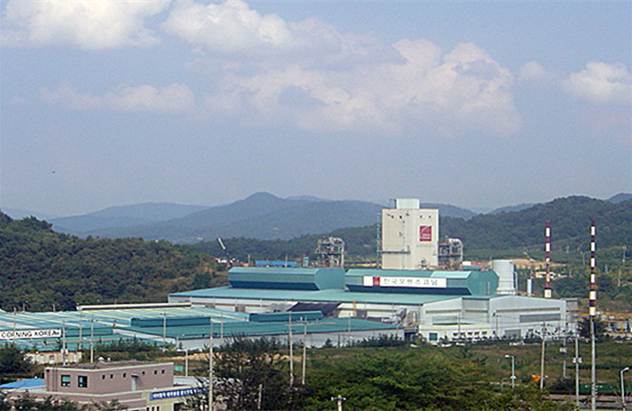
Plant in Gimcheon, Korea

The company has 30 composites facilities and 31 insulation facilities.

== Environmental work ==
In the Kansas City metropolitan area, Owens Corning purchases locally sourced recycled glass from Ripple Glass to manufacture fiberglass insulation in its local manufacturing plant. The joint effort between Owens Corning and Ripple Glass is helping to greatly reduce the amount of glass that would have been deposited in local Kansas City landfills. The Owens Corning Roofing and Asphalt Shingle Recycling Program was launched in 2009 to keep shingles out of landfills.

In 2013, Constellation Energy built a 2.7-megawatt solar power system at an Owens Corning insulation plant in Delmar, New York. The power system, which is leased to Owens Corning, can produce 3.3 million kilowatt hours of electrical energy in a year.

The National Safety Council awarded Owens Corning the Green Cross for Safety medal in 2014. Owens Corning received a perfect score of 100 percent on the 2015 Corporate Equality Index released by the Human Rights Campaign. Owens Corning has been recognized on the Dow Jones Sustainability World Index for six consecutive years as of 2015. It is also ranked number 1 in the 100 Best Corporate Citizens ranking by Corporate Responsibility Magazine in 2022.
