= Dimitri Hadzi =

American sculptor

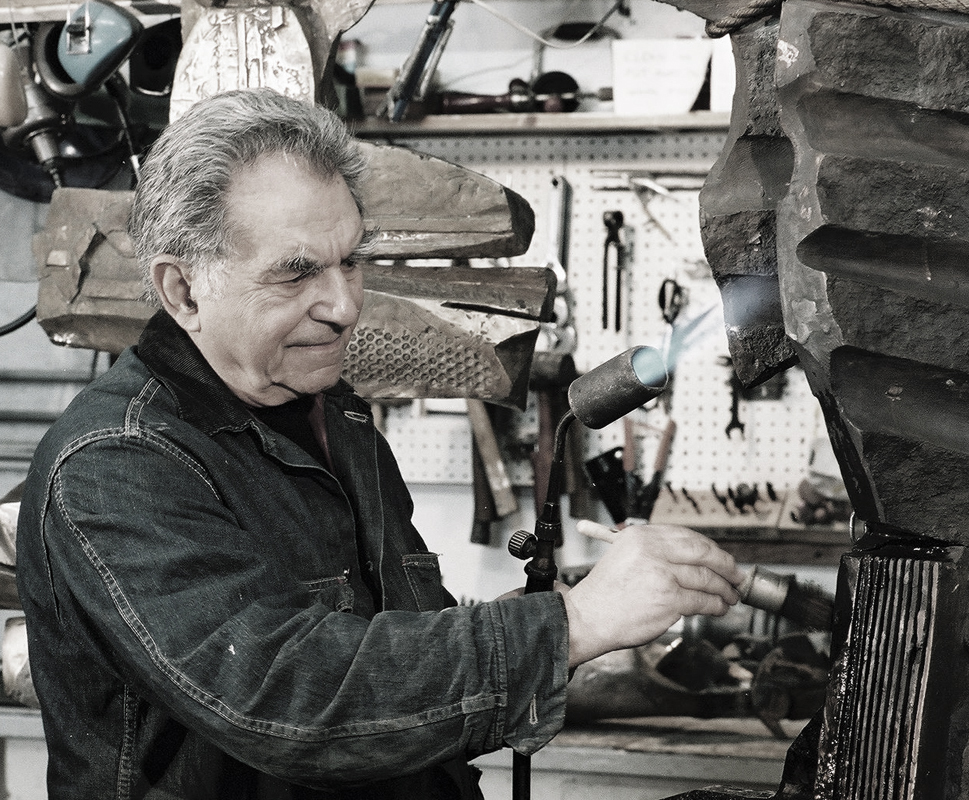
- Dimitri Hadzi at work in his studio in Cambridge
- Born: March 21, 1921; New York City, U.S.
- Died: April 16, 2006 (aged 85); Cambridge, Massachusetts, U.S.
- Education: Cooper Union
- Known for: Abstract monumental sculpture
- Notable work: Elmo; Centaur; Twin Gates; Propylaea; River Legend
- Style: Abstract modernist
- Spouse(s): Martha Leeb (divorced); Cynthia Hoyle von Thüna (1985)
- Awards: 1957 Guggenheim Fellow; 1962 Venice Biennale; 1974 Rome Prize
- Elected: 1983 American Academy of Arts and Letters, 1990 National Academy of Design, Associate member 1994 National Academy of Design, full Academician
- Website: dimitrihadzi.com

Dimitri Hadzi (March 21, 1921 – April 16, 2006) was an American abstract sculptor who lived and worked in Rome, Italy, for 25 years and later resided in Cambridge, Massachusetts, where he also taught at Harvard University for over a decade.

== Life ==
Hadzi was born to Greek-American immigrant parents in Greenwich Village, New York City on March 21, 1921. As a child, he attended a Greek after-school program, where he learned language, mythology, history, and theater. He also won a prize for drawing. After graduating from Brooklyn Technical High School, he worked as a chemist, while continuing his studies in chemistry by night.

In 1942, he signed up for the Army Air Force, serving in the South Pacific region while continuing to draw in his spare time. After his service, he returned to New York to study painting and sculpture at Cooper Union.

Hadzi taught studio arts at Harvard University, from 1975 to 1989.

== Personal life ==
Hadzi married Martha Leeb, but later divorced. In June 1985, he married Cynthia von Thuna. He died in 2006.

== Works ==
- Centaur (1954), in the garden of Prospect House in Princeton, New Jersey
- Elmo-MIT, 1960s
- Onfalo III (1962), 1300 E Lafayette, Detroit, MI
- K. 458 The Hunt (1966), Avery Fisher Hall, New York City, refers to Mozart's String Quartet in B flat, K. 458
- River Legend (1976), Edith Green – Wendell Wyatt Federal Building, Portland, Oregon
- Thermopylae (1960s), John F. Kennedy Federal Building, Boston
- Propylaea (1982), a sculptural fountain in Toledo, Ohio
- Omphalos (1985), formerly at Harvard Square MBTA station through the Arts on the Line program, but was to be repaired and relocated to Rockport, Massachusetts
- Helmet V, (1959-1961) Hirshhorn Museum and Sculpture Garden, Washington DC
- Red Mountains (1991), Hugo L. Black United States Courthouse, Birmingham, Alabama. The sculpture, installed in 1991, was removed in 2012 for renovations to the building. A provision of the 2014 Financial Appropriations Act barred the General Services Administration from replacing it for fear that it could be used to shield an attacker.
- Elmo V (1961), The Governor Nelson A. Rockefeller Empire State Plaza Art Collection, Albany, NY

== Awards ==
- 1957 Guggenheim Fellow
- 1962 Venice Biennale
- 1974 Rome Prize
- 1990 National Academy of Design, Associate member
- 1994 National Academy of Design, full Academician

== Removal of artworks ==
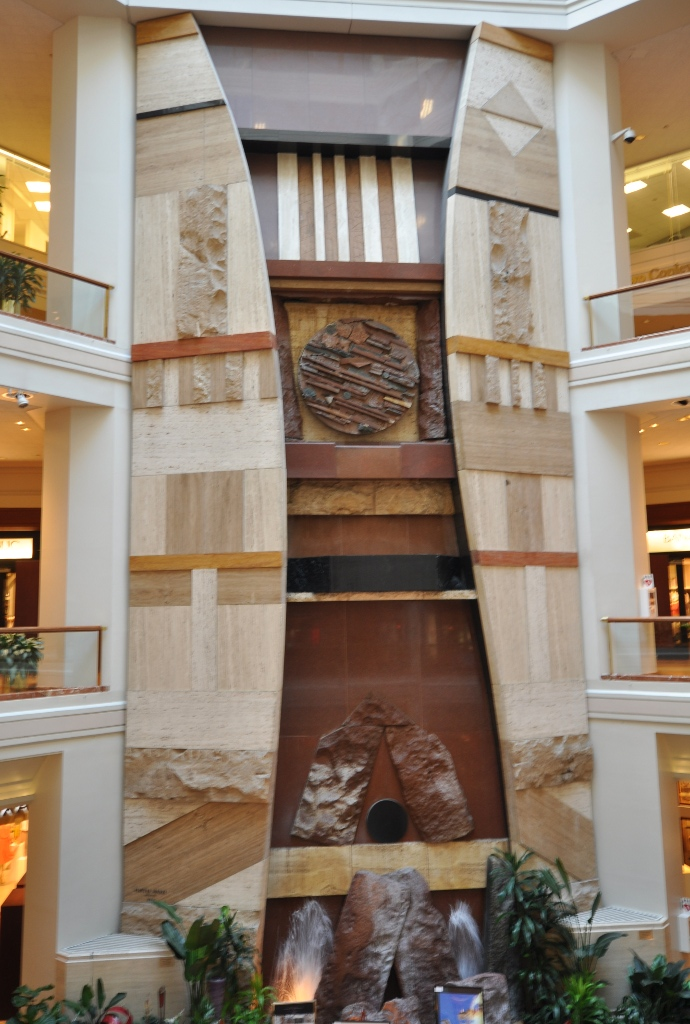
This centerpiece sculptural fountain (1983), whose waterfall had been shut off by the time of this 2012 photo, was completely removed by 2014. Its condition and location remain unknown.

Some of Hadzi's public artworks have been removed since his death, as noted above. In addition to the named works, a 60-foot (18 m) high sculptural fountain designed by him was completely demolished and removed circa 2014, despite protests by his widow and other commentators. The artwork was the centerpiece of Boston's Copley Place indoor shopping mall, and was composed of multiple abstract granite and travertine marble shapes, with a waterfall cascading down it into a shallow pool at the bottom, surrounded by marble benches. As of 2022, there was scant remaining evidence the fountain had ever existed, and the ownership, location, and status of its components were unknown to the general public.
