= O-I Glass =

American manufacturing company

O-I Glass, Inc.
- Logo since 1973

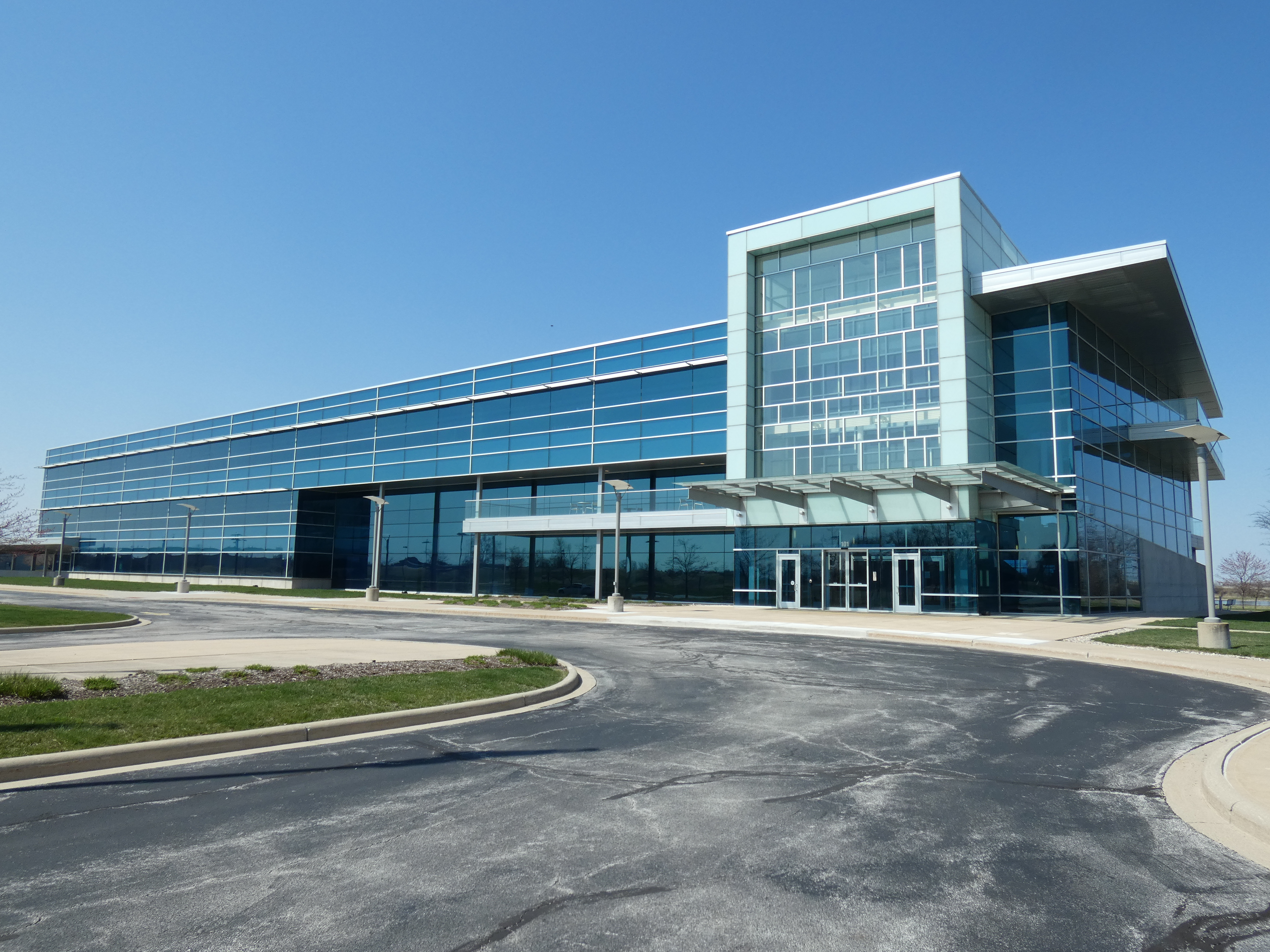
- Headquarters
- Formerly: Owens-Brockway, Inc.
- Type: Public, formerly Private from 1987 to 1991 when owned by KKR
- Traded as: NYSE: OI (until 1987, again since 1991); S&P 600 component; S&P 500 component (1957–1987, 1991–2000, 2008–2016) S&P 400 component (2000–2008) DJIA component (until 1987)
- Industry: Packaging; Glass
- Founded: 1929; 97 years ago in Toledo, Ohio, U.S.
- Founder: Michael J. Owens
- Headquarters: Perrysburg, Ohio, U.S.
- Key people: Gordon Hardie (CEO)
- Products: Glass
- Services: Glass manufacturing
- Revenue: ▲US$7.1 billion (2024)
- Operating income: ▲US$259 million (2024)
- Net income: ▲US$104 million (2024)
- Number of employees: 23,000 (2024)
- Website: o-i.com

O-I Glass, Inc. (formerly Owens-Illinois) is an American company that specializes in container glass products. It is the largest manufacturer of glass containers in North America, South America, Asia-Pacific and Europe (after acquiring BSN Glasspack in 2004).

== Company ==
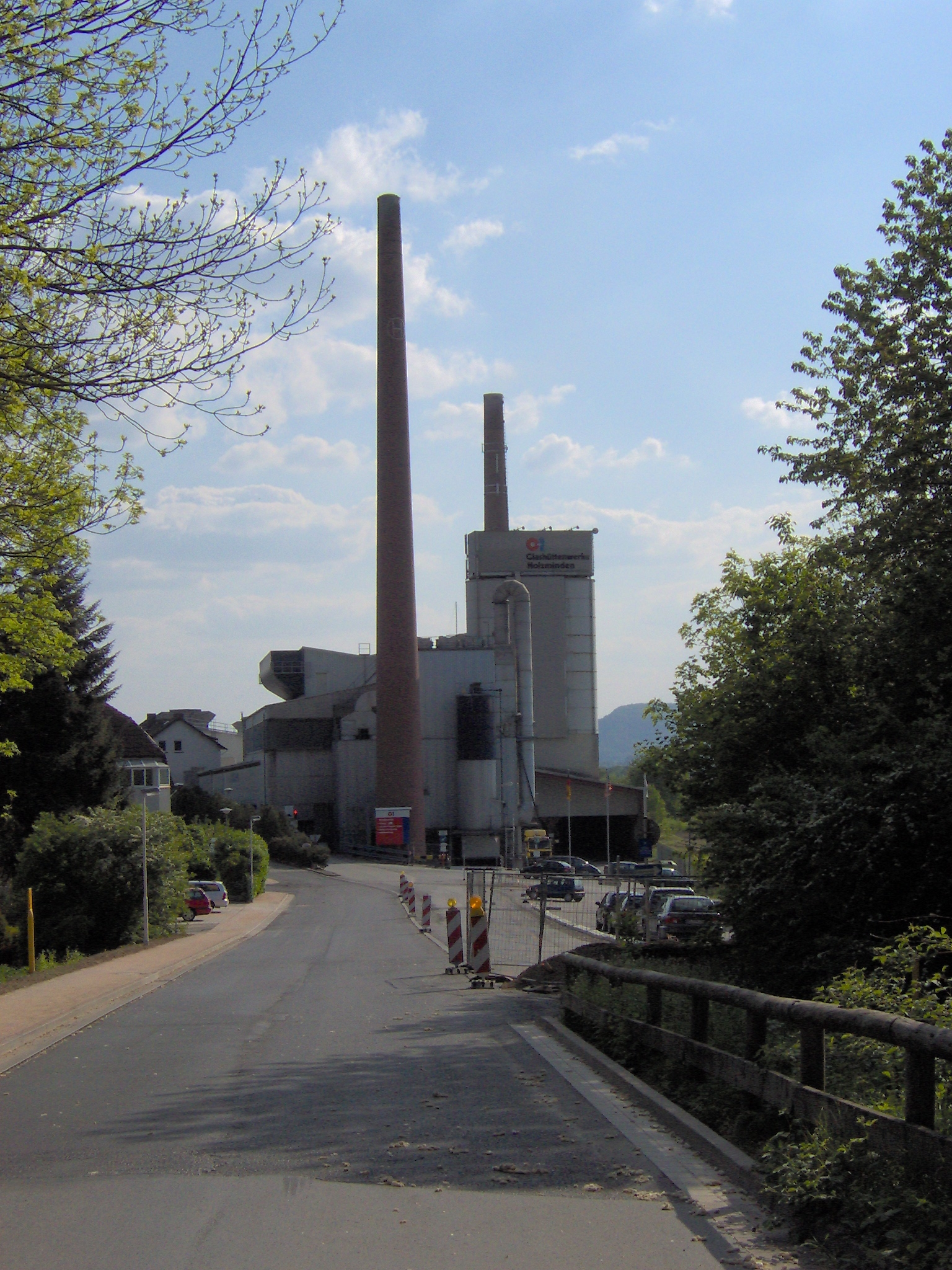
O-I Location in Holzminden, Germany

While legally known as Owens-Illinois, Inc., the company changed its trade name to O-I in 2005 to group its global operations under a single, cross-language and cross-culture brand name.

The company's headquarters were previously located at One SeaGate, Toledo, Ohio. The headquarters were moved in late 2006 to the Levis Commons complex in Perrysburg, Ohio. The company is the successor to the Owens Bottle Company founded in 1903 by Michael Joseph Owens, who made the first automated bottle-making machine, and Edward Drummond Libbey. In 1929, the Owens Bottle Company merged with Illinois Glass Company to become Owens-Illinois, Inc. Six years later, in 1935, Owens-Illinois formed a working partnership with Corning Incorporated which became the Owens Corning Fiberglass Company in 1938.

In 1971 Owens-Illinois produced an early commercial plasma display, the digivue.

Until July 2007, the company was also a worldwide manufacturer of plastics packaging with operations in North America, South America, Asia-Pacific and Europe. Plastics packaging products manufactured by O-I included containers, closures, and prescription containers. In July 2007 O-I completed the sale of its entire plastics packaging business to Rexam, a United Kingdom listed packaging manufacturer.

Owens-Illinois was a part of the Dow Jones Industrial Average from June 1, 1959, until March 12, 1987. The company was added to the S&P 500 Index in January 2009. Owens-Illinois was one of the original S&P 500 companies in 1957. It was removed in 1987 (after purchase by KKR), added in 1991 and removed again in 2000.

In October 2010, Owens-Illinois Venezuela C.A was expropriated by President Hugo Chávez.

In May 2015, O-I made an offer to purchase the food and beverage glass container business of Mexican company Vitro for $2.15 billion. The acquisition closed in September 2015.

In 2020, a subsidiary of O-I Glass, Paddock Enterprises, entered bankruptcy following numerous asbestos lawsuits filed against the company. All of the company's asbestos-related claims were isolated within Paddock and separated from O-I's glass-making operations.

== Partnership with NEG ==
Owens-Illinois partnered with NEG (Nippon Electric Glass), to produce glass television screens at its Columbus, Ohio, and Pittston, Pennsylvania, plants in the 1970s through the mid-1990s before allowing Techneglas to take over the operations.

== Environmental issues ==
Although it has not made asbestos-containing materials since 1958, Owens-Illinois invented, tested, manufactured and distributed KAYLO asbestos containing thermal pipe insulation from 1948 through 1958. Owens-Illinois remains a named defendant in numerous asbestos litigation matters throughout the U.S. Some claims in these cases allege that Owens-Illinois was a participant in the seventh annual Saranac Seminar when the cancer-causing potential of asbestos was studied in the 1950s.

As a result of a pattern of violations producing repeat emissions, its Oregon plant was fined in August 2023 by the Oregon Department of Environmental Quality. This was their 10th fine.

== Anti-Labor issues ==
In 2023, O-I Glass was penalized by the Federal Trade Commission for its use of illegal non-compete bindings placed on former employees of the company.

== See also ==
- In-mould labelling
- Glass container production
- Glass
