= Government Center, Boston =

Area in downtown Boston, Massachusetts

Coordinates: 42°21′38.52″N 71°03′33.22″W

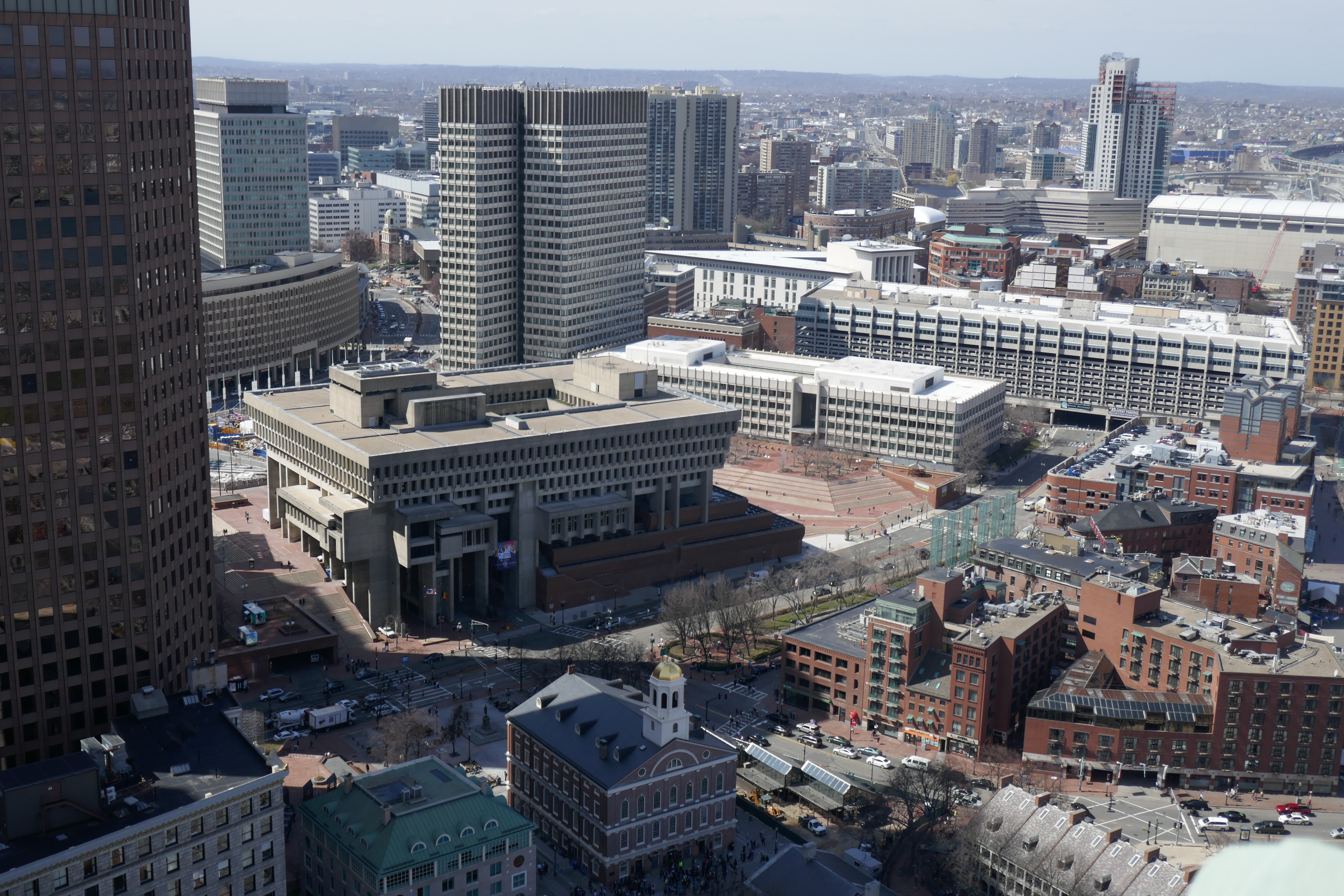
View of Government Center from the Custom House Tower

Government Center is an area in downtown Boston, centered on City Hall Plaza. Formerly the site of Scollay Square, it is now the location of Boston City Hall, courthouses, state and federal office buildings, and a major MBTA subway station, also called Government Center. Its development was controversial, as the project displaced thousands of residents and razed several hundred homes and businesses.

Controversial in design since before it was completed, the use of Brutalist architecture for its main buildings, as well as the open brick-and-concrete plaza at the center of the development, have been alternately praised for its innovative design, and scorned for its lack of character and uninviting appearance. After decades of calls for a redesign to make it more friendly and usable, a major rebuild of City Hall Plaza, the main public space of Government Center, was begun in 2020 and is to include additional seating areas, play spaces for children, and space for public art.

== History ==
=== Post-colonial development and commerce ===
Scollay Square was named for William Scollay, a prominent local developer and militia officer who bought a landmark four-story merchant building at the intersection of Cambridge and Court Streets in 1795. Local citizens began to refer to the intersection as Scollay's Square, and, in 1838, the city officially memorialized the intersection as Scollay Square.

Early on, the area was a busy center of commerce, including the city's first daguerreotypist (photographer), Josiah Johnson Hawes (1808–1901), and Dr. William Thomas Green Morton, the first dentist to use ether as an anaesthetic.

Local cultural landmarks took form, attracting visits from such intellectual contemporaries as Charles Dickens.

=== Abolitionism ===
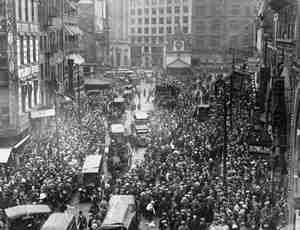
Militia tries to maintain order in Scollay Square during the 1919 Boston Police Strike.

Scollay Square was also a flashpoint for the early abolition movement. Author William Lloyd Garrison was twice attacked by an angry mob for printing his anti-slavery newspaper The Liberator, which began publication in 1831. Sarah Parker Remond's first act of civil disobedience occurred in 1853 at the Old Howard when she was refused the seat she had purchased but was instead seated in the 'black' section. Many of the buildings in the area in and around Scollay Square had hidden spaces where escaped slaves were hidden, as part of the Underground Railroad.

=== The Old Howard ===
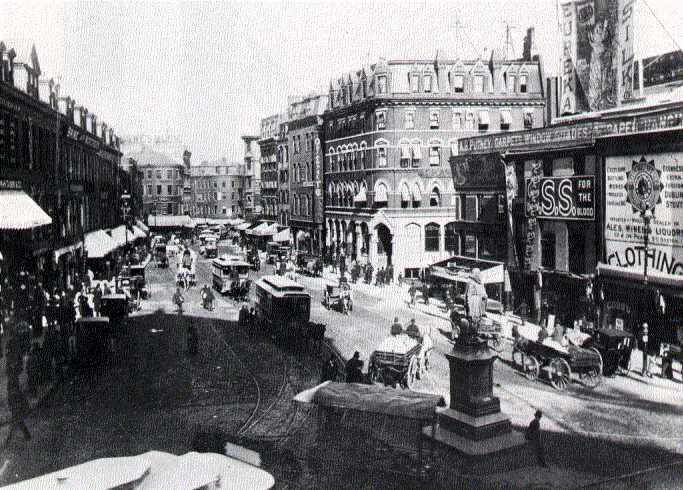
Scollay Square in the 1880s

Among the most famous (and infamous) of Scollay Square landmarks was the Old Howard Theatre, a grand theater which began life as the headquarters of a Millerite Adventist Christian sect which believed the world would end in October 1844. After the world failed to end on schedule, the building was sold in 1844 and reopened as a vaudeville and Shakespearean venue. Later, in the 1900s and 1910s, it would showcase the popular minstrel shows.

By around the 1940s the Scollay Square area began to lose its vibrant commercial activity, and the Howard gradually changed its image and began to cater to sailors on leave and college students by including burlesque shows, as did other nearby venues such as the Casino Theater and Crawford House. "Always Something Doing" became the Old Howard's advertising slogan. The venue also showcased boxing matches with such old-time greats as local Rocky Marciano and John L. Sullivan, and continued to feature slapstick vaudeville acts, from likes of The Marx Brothers and Abbott and Costello.

But it was the success and prominence of the burlesque shows that brought the Old Howard down. In 1953, vice squad agents sneaked a home movie camera into the Old Howard, and caught Mary Goodneighbor on film doing her striptease for the audience. The film led to the closure of the theater, and it remained closed until it caught fire mysteriously in 1961.

The square was also the home of Austin and Stone's Dime Museum.

=== Destruction and redevelopment ===
As early as the 1950s, city officials had been mulling plans to completely tear down and redevelop the Scollay Square area, in order to remove lower-income residents and troubled businesses from the aging and seedy district. Attempts to reopen the sullied Old Howard by its old performers had been one of the last efforts against redevelopment; but with the theater gutted by fire, a city wrecking ball began the project of demolishing over 1000 buildings in the area; 20,000 residents were displaced.

With $40 million in federal funds, the city built an entirely new development on top of old Scollay Square, renaming the area Government Center, and peppering it with city, state, and federal government buildings.

A 1958 report by the Boston Planning Board, entitled Government Center Project, set out the case for construction of a center:

The future of Boston depends in large degree on how effectively and efficiently it continues to perform its role as the central city of an important metropolitan area and as the regional center for New England. ... One of the basic functions of such a regional center is the provision of governmental services at all levels. ... At the present time the accommodations in Boston for all levels of government are inadequate and inefficient.

== Major structures ==
=== Boston City Hall ===
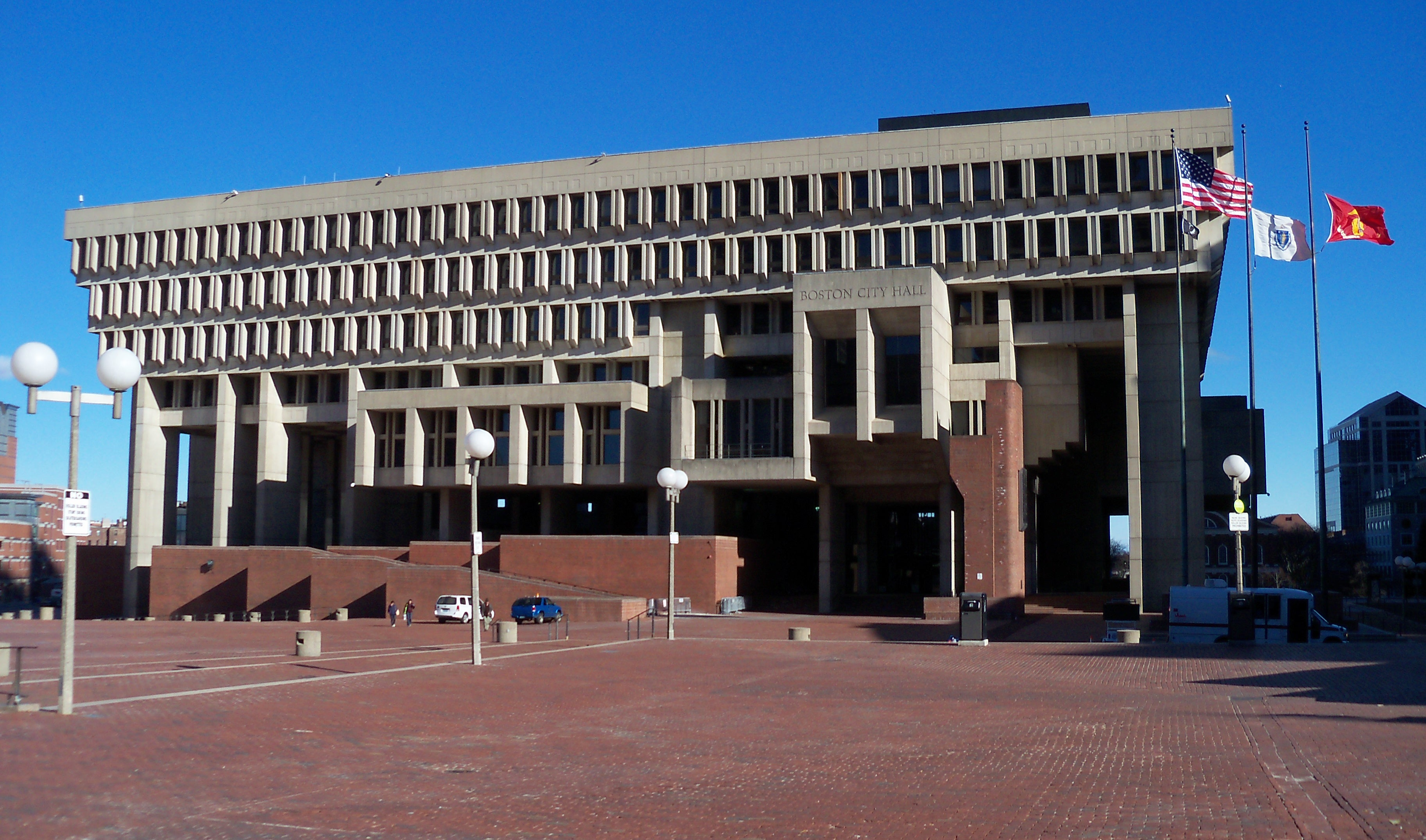
Boston City Hall

The dominant feature of Government Center is the enormous, imposing, and brutalist Boston City Hall, designed by Kallmann McKinnell & Wood and built in the 1960s as part of Boston's first large urban renewal scheme. While considered by some to have architectural merit, the building is not universally admired, and is sharply unpopular among locals. Furthermore, it is resented for having replaced the Victorian architecture of Boston's Scollay Square, a lively commercial district that lapsed into squalor in the twentieth century.

=== John Fitzgerald Kennedy Federal Building ===
John Fitzgerald Kennedy Federal Building is a United States government office building. It is located across City Hall Plaza from Boston City Hall. An example of 1960s modern architecture, it consists of two 26 floor towers that sit on-axis to each other and a low rise building of four floors that connects to the two towers via an enclosed glass corridor. The two towers stand at a height of 118 meters (387 ft).

=== City Hall Plaza ===
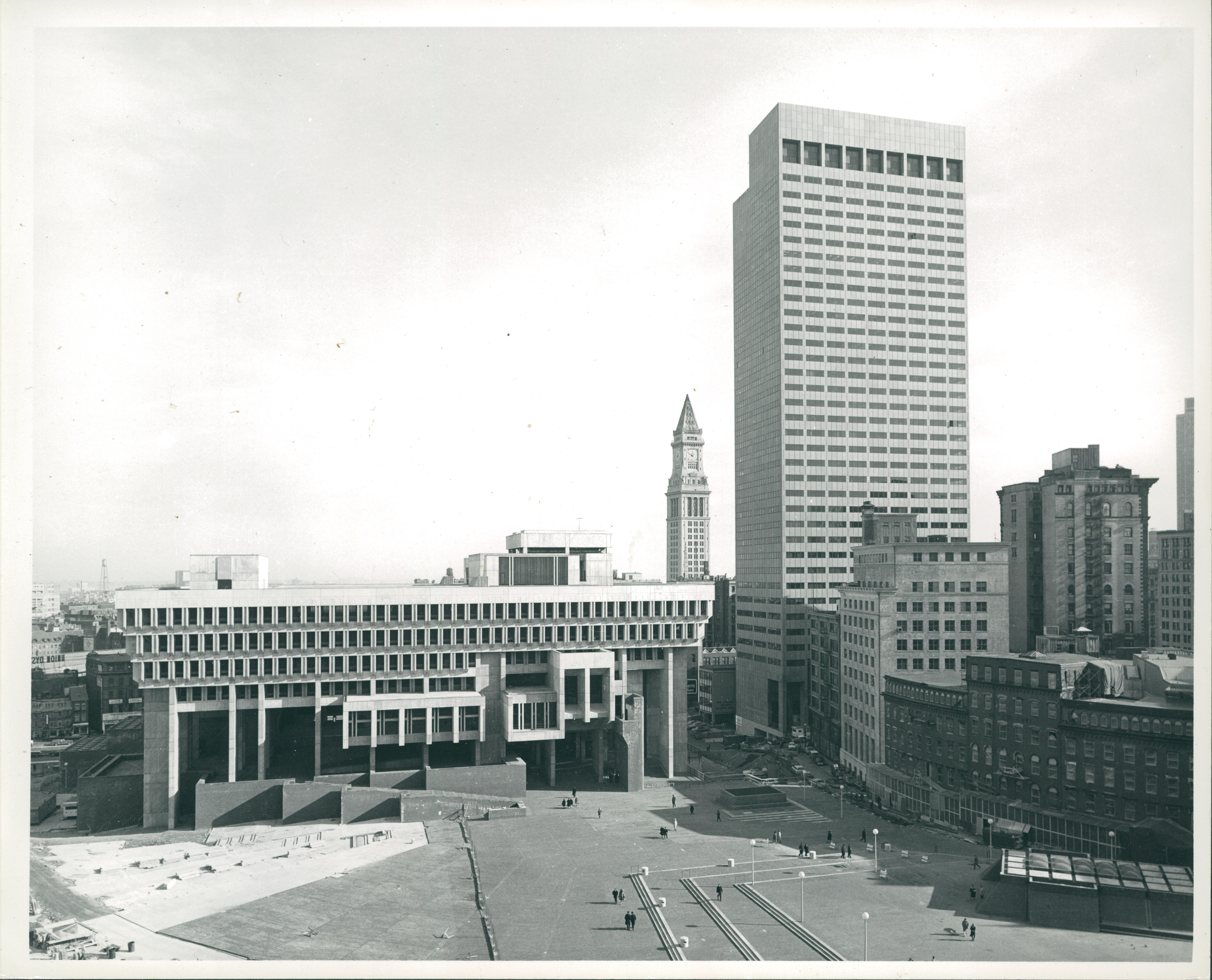
City Hall Plaza, c. 1968

City Hall Plaza is not a well-loved space, either. As Bill Wasik wrote in 2006, "It is as if the space were calibrated to render futile any gathering, large or small, attempted anywhere on its arid expanse. All the nearby buildings seem to be facing away, making the plaza's 11 acres (45,000 m^{2}) of concrete and brick feel like the world's largest back alley. ... [It is] so devoid of benches, greenery, and other signposts of human hospitality that even on the loveliest fall weekend, when the Common and Esplanade and other public spaces teem with Bostonians at leisure, the plaza stands utterly empty save for the occasional skateboarder…" The plaza is often colloquially referred to as "the brick desert."

=== Government Service Center ===
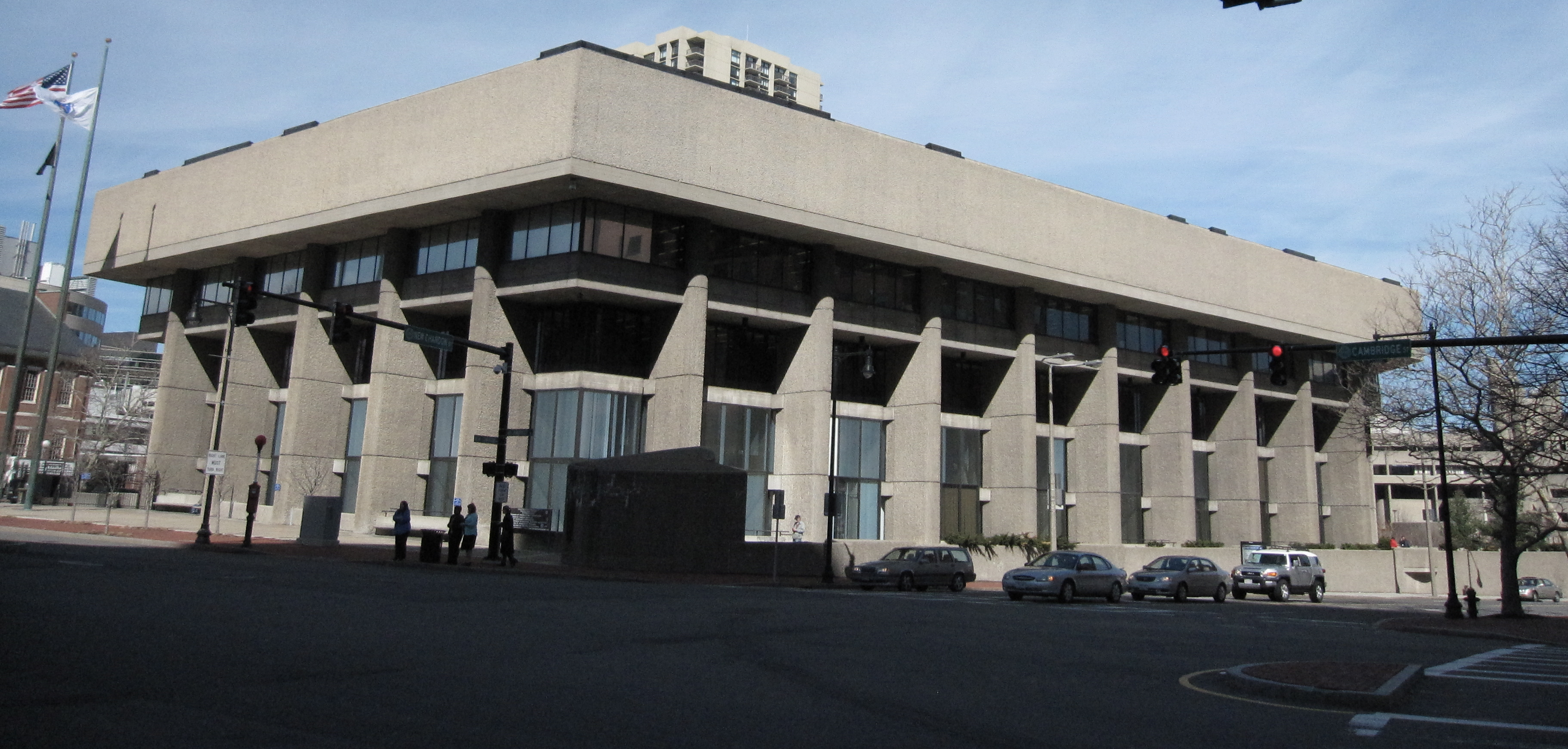
Government Service Center

Another very large Brutalist building at Government Center, less prominently located and thus less well known than City Hall, is the Government Service Center, designed by architect Paul Rudolph. The building is unfinished as the tall central tower in the original plan was never built. In the mid-1990s, the adjacent space was filled with the Edward W. Brooke Courthouse, which houses a division of the Boston Municipal Court. This irregularly shaped, sloping lot was the last parcel to be developed of the Government Center urban renewal plan; in the interim the space was used as surface parking. In a 2014 article, architectural historian Timothy M. Rohan praised the building for having "a wondrous interior courtyard like something from baroque Rome, a space that even in its incomplete and neglected state contrasts sharply with nearby City Hall and its alienating plaza."

=== Government Center Garage ===
This 2,300-space privately owned garage was built as part of the Government Center urban renewal project. In 2016, the Boston Redevelopment Authority gave final approval for the replacement of the garage with "Bulfinch Crossing," a 2.9-million-square-foot (270,000 m^{2}) mixed-use development designed by Pelli Clarke Pelli Architects. Construction began in January 2017. The design of the office tower was revealed in June 2019.

=== Center Plaza ===
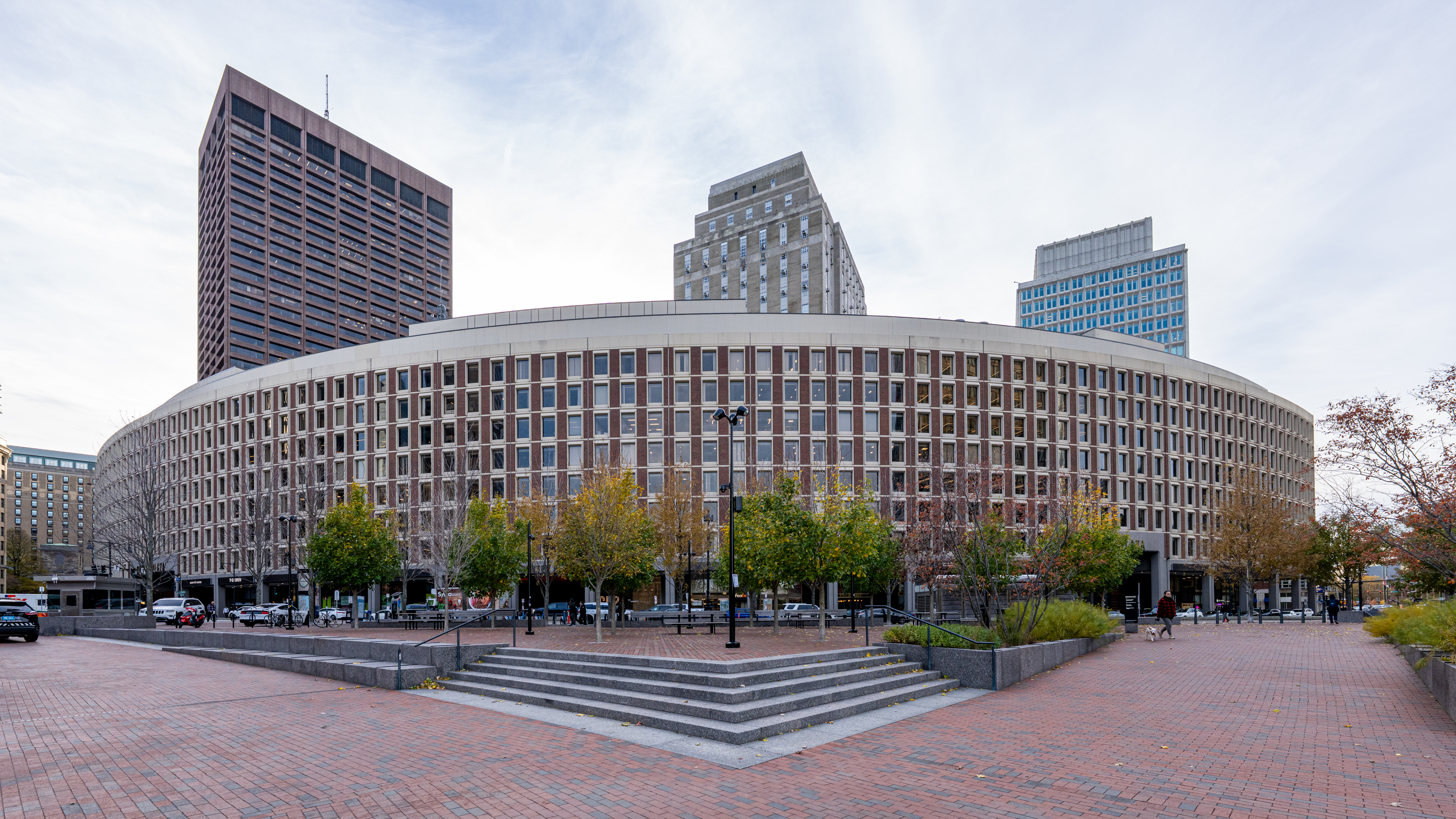
Center Plaza

This 720,000 square foot (67,000 m^{2}) office and retail structure, built by developer Norman B. Leventhal, is across Cambridge Street from City Hall Plaza. In 2014, the property was sold by the Blackstone Group to Shorenstein Properties. Shorenstein Properties has proposed a $25 million renovation designed "to add some new buzz" to the building. The renovation was approved by the Boston Redevelopment Authority in 2016.

=== Nearby public buildings ===
Several state and federal government buildings near Government Center were not built as part of the urban renewal project. These include the Massachusetts State House, the McCormack Building, the Saltonstall Building, the Suffolk County Courthouse, and the Thomas P. O'Neill Jr. Federal Building.

=== Sears' Crescent and Sears' Block ===
The Sears' Crescent and Sears' Block are a pair of 19th century buildings that border City Hall Plaza on the south.

The golden steaming kettle mounted on the corner of the Sears' Block, 63-65 Court Street, pre-dates the Government Center redevelopment. It was manufactured for the Oriental Tea Company in 1873, which held a contest to guess the volume of the kettle and staged a spectacle in which nine children and a tall man crawled out of the kettle. Its volume was measured by the city's official sealer of weights and measures at 227 gallons, 2 quarts, 1 pint, and 3 gills, (861.1 L) which for a time was painted on the side. The tea shop at 85-87 Court Street was demolished, but the owner, Nathan Sharaf, opened Steaming Kettle Coffee Shop in the new building and mounted the kettle. It became Croissant Du Jour in 1988, then Coffee Connection, then Starbucks in 1997.

== Geography and transportation ==
Government Center is located between the North End, Downtown, and Beacon Hill neighborhoods.

=== Boundaries ===
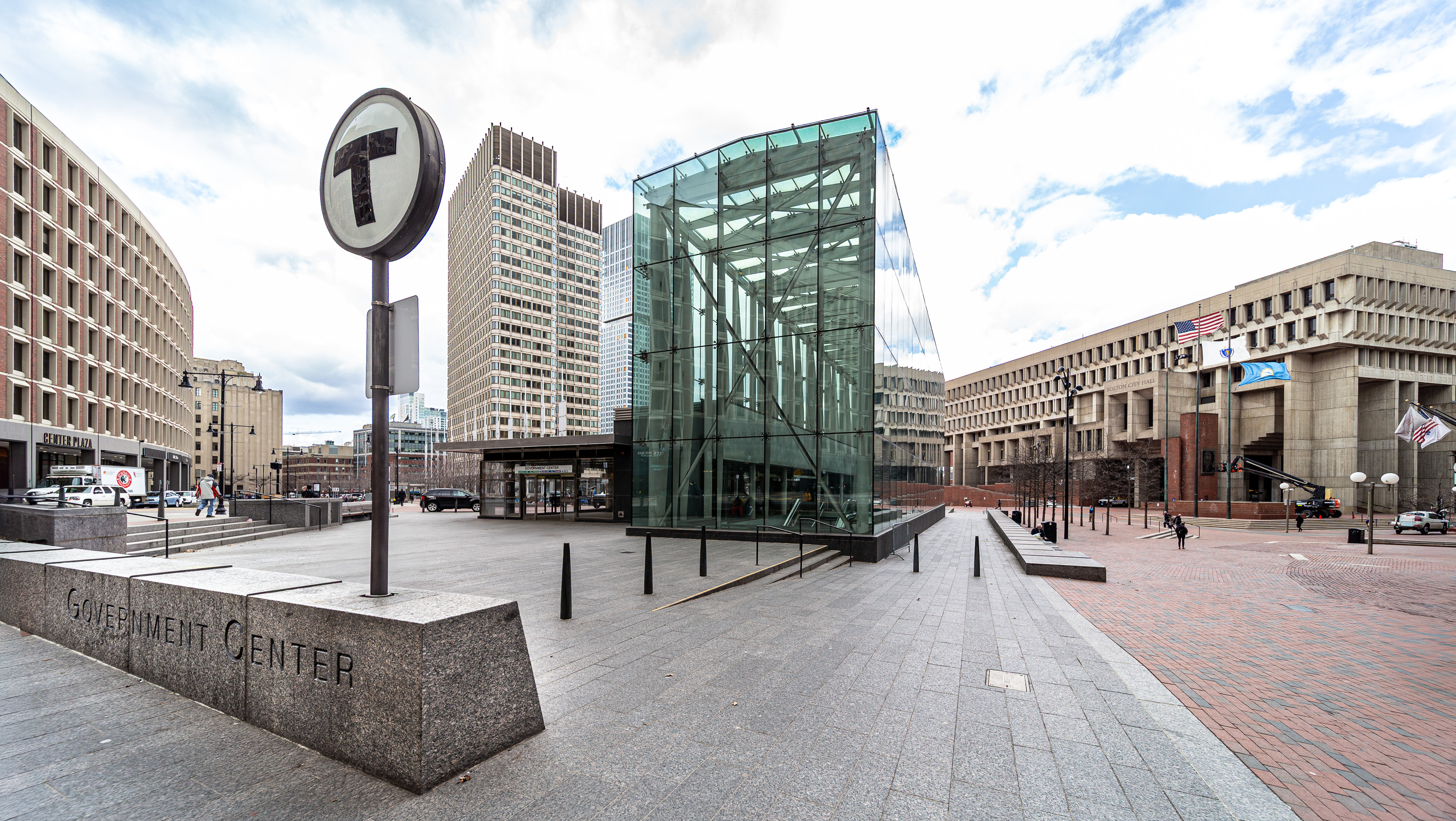
Government Center

Government Center does not have official boundaries. A 2011 Boston Redevelopment Authority map of Boston neighborhoods shows most of the Government Center area as part of the Downtown neighborhood, and the rest as part of the West End.

Other maps and documents show a variety of different boundaries for Government Center. The Boston Zoning Code has a map called "1H Government Center/Markets District." The map shows the Government Center portion of the district extending as far west as the Massachusetts State House and including all of the major structures listed in this article. The Boston Redevelopment Authority map of "Urban Renewal Areas" includes a somewhat smaller area that excludes the McCormack and Saltonstall Buildings.

By contrast, a search for "Government Center" on Google Maps yields a map showing an even smaller area that is bounded by Court, Cambridge, Sudbury, and Congress Streets. The AirBnB neighborhood map shows a somewhat larger area than the Google Map. An undated Boston Redevelopment Authority map entitled "Government Center Urban Renewal Area Illustrative Site Plan" showed similar boundaries.

=== Mass transit ===
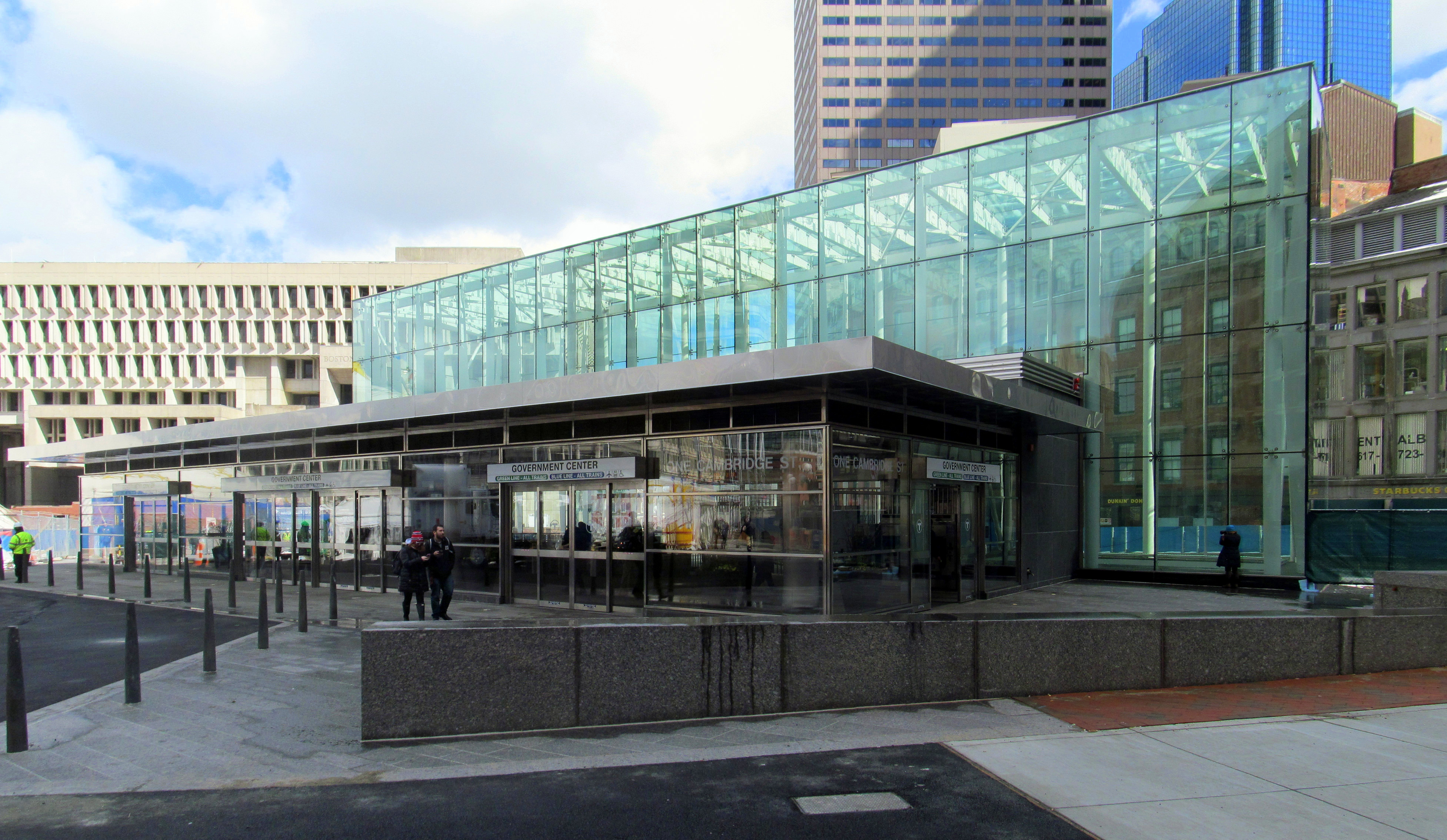
Government Center station upon reopening in March 2016

Scollay Square station opened as part of the third phase of the Tremont Street Subway in September 1898, bringing subway service to the area with a stone headhouse in the center of the square. Court Street station opened on the East Boston Tunnel in December 1904; it was closed in 1914 and replaced by a lower level (Scollay Under) to the Scollay Square station in 1916. The station was rebuilt in 1963 as Government Center station with a low brick headhouse, and again from 2014 to 2016 with a large glass headhouse that dominates the south side of the plaza. It serves as the transfer point between the MBTA's Blue and Green Lines.

=== Surroundings ===
Government Center is adjacent to historic Faneuil Hall and popular Quincy Market and very near the Old State House. It is two blocks away from the Rose Fitzgerald Kennedy Greenway, which was created as part of the Big Dig. Major city streets in the vicinity include Tremont, Congress, Cambridge, State, New Chardon, and Washington Streets. Hints of another street, Cornhill, still exist along one edge of City Hall Plaza. Two of the neighborhood's few remaining old buildings, the Sears' Crescent and Sears' Block, face the plaza and follow the original curve of Cornhill. A veteran's home & services provider, still has an entrance with a Cornhill address. Plans for Government Center, including the Boston Redevelopment Authority's "Government center 2000 project", called for the construction of two footbridges over Congress Street to connect City Hall Plaza to the Faneuil Hall area. Neither bridge was built.

== Gallery ==
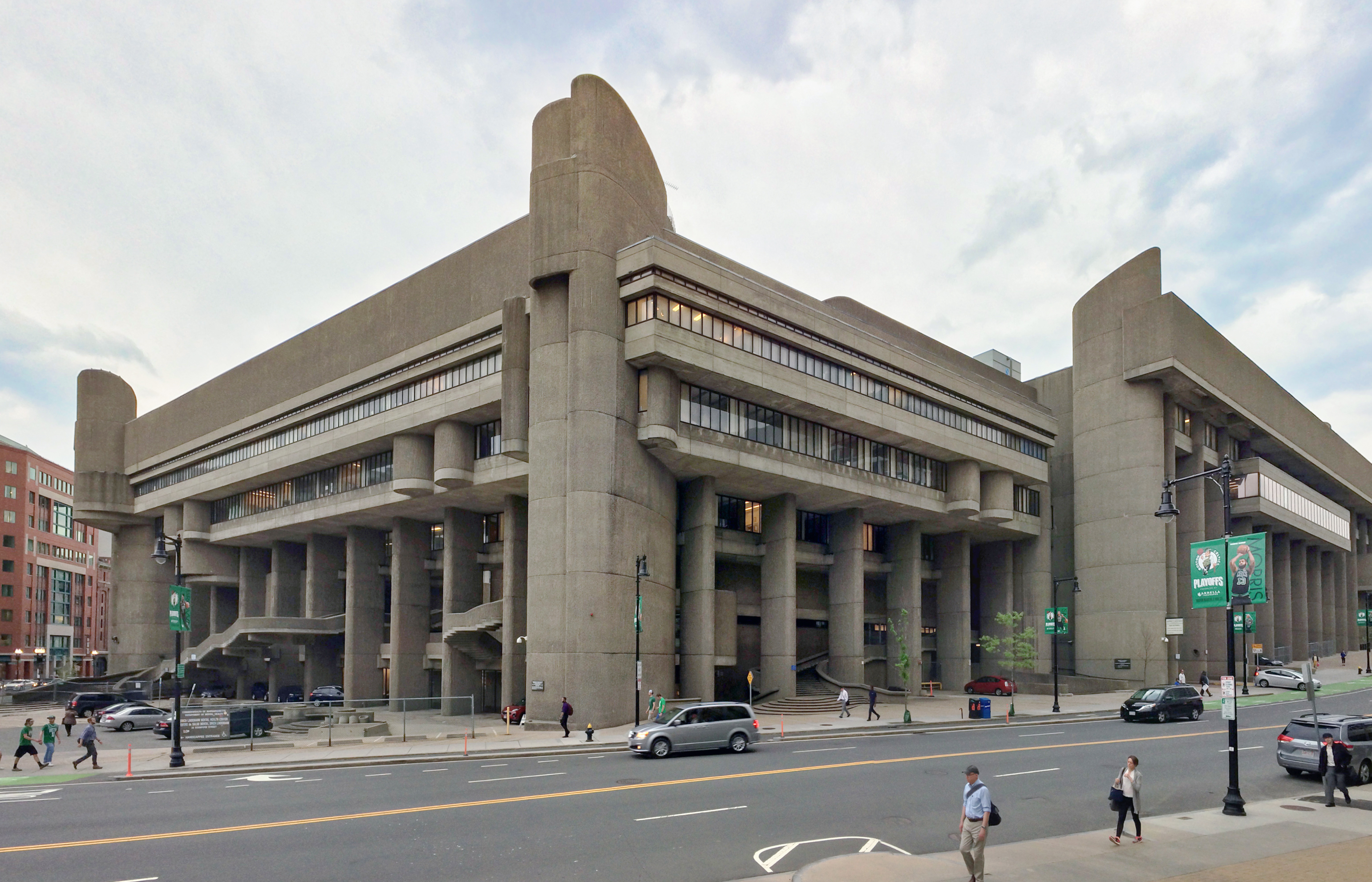
Boston Government Service Center

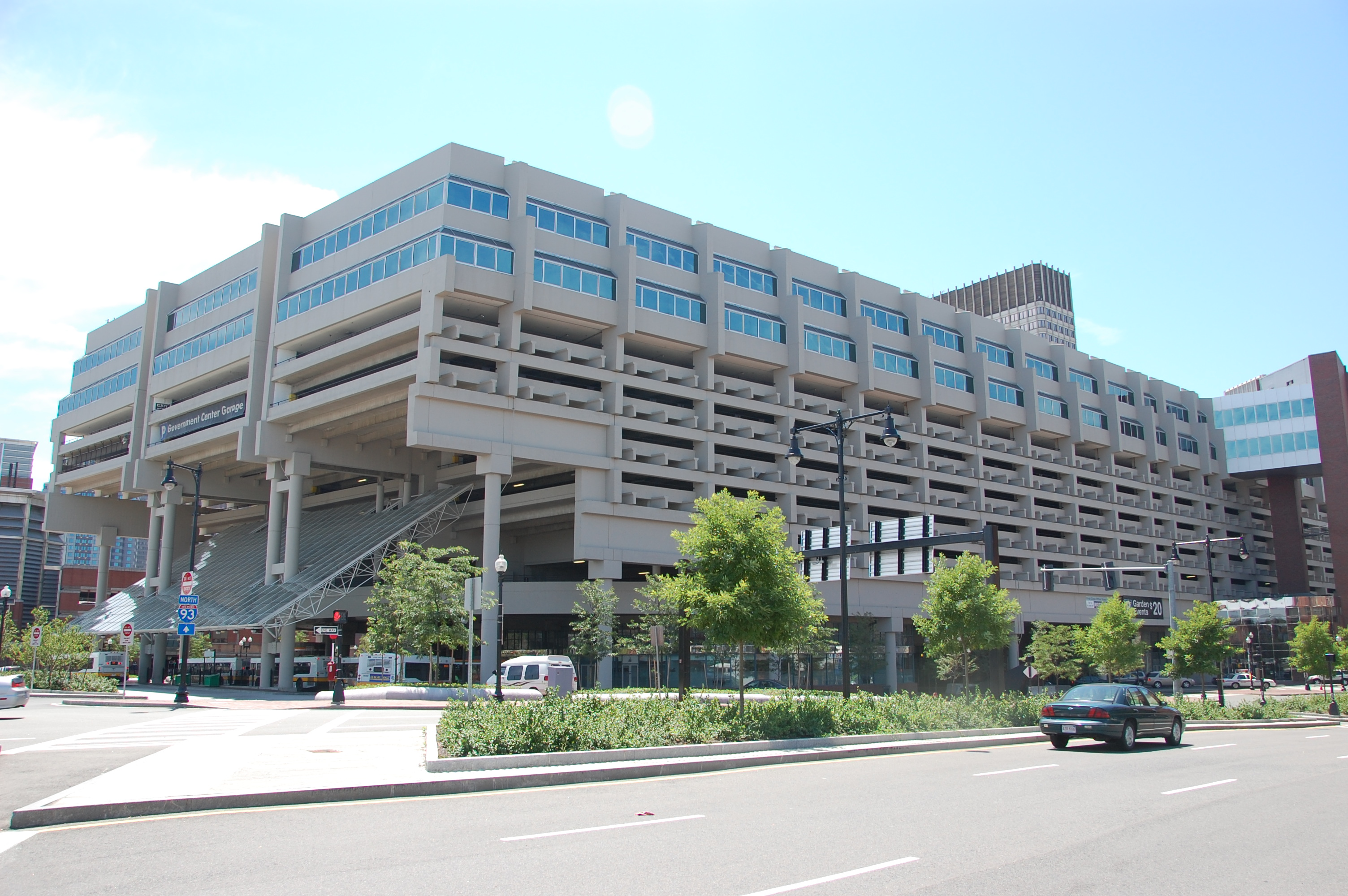
Government Center Garage

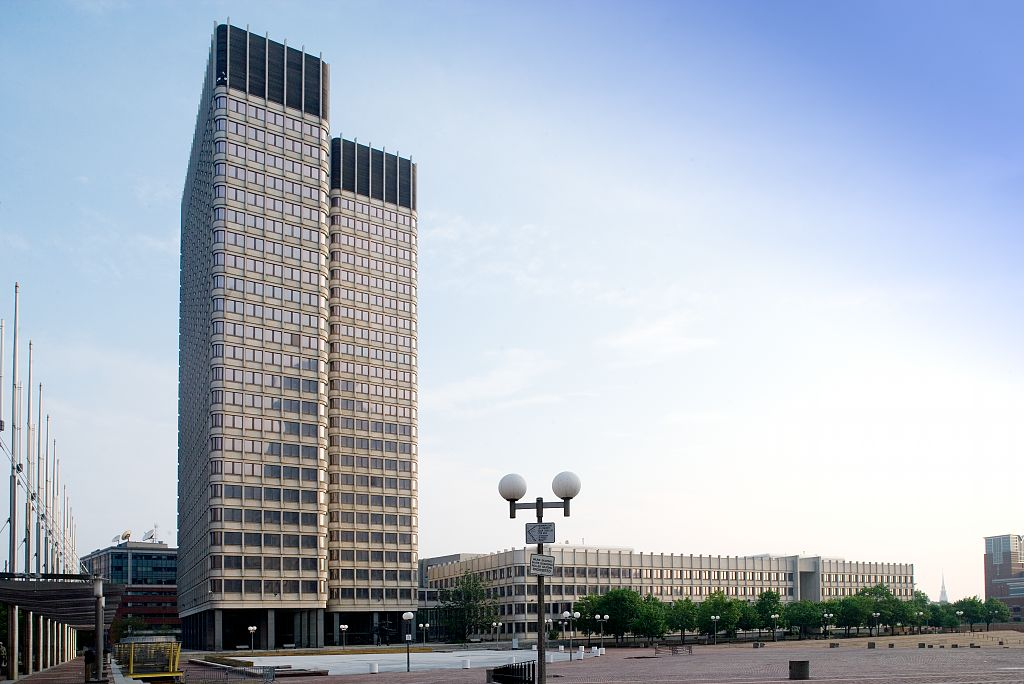
John F. Kennedy Federal Building

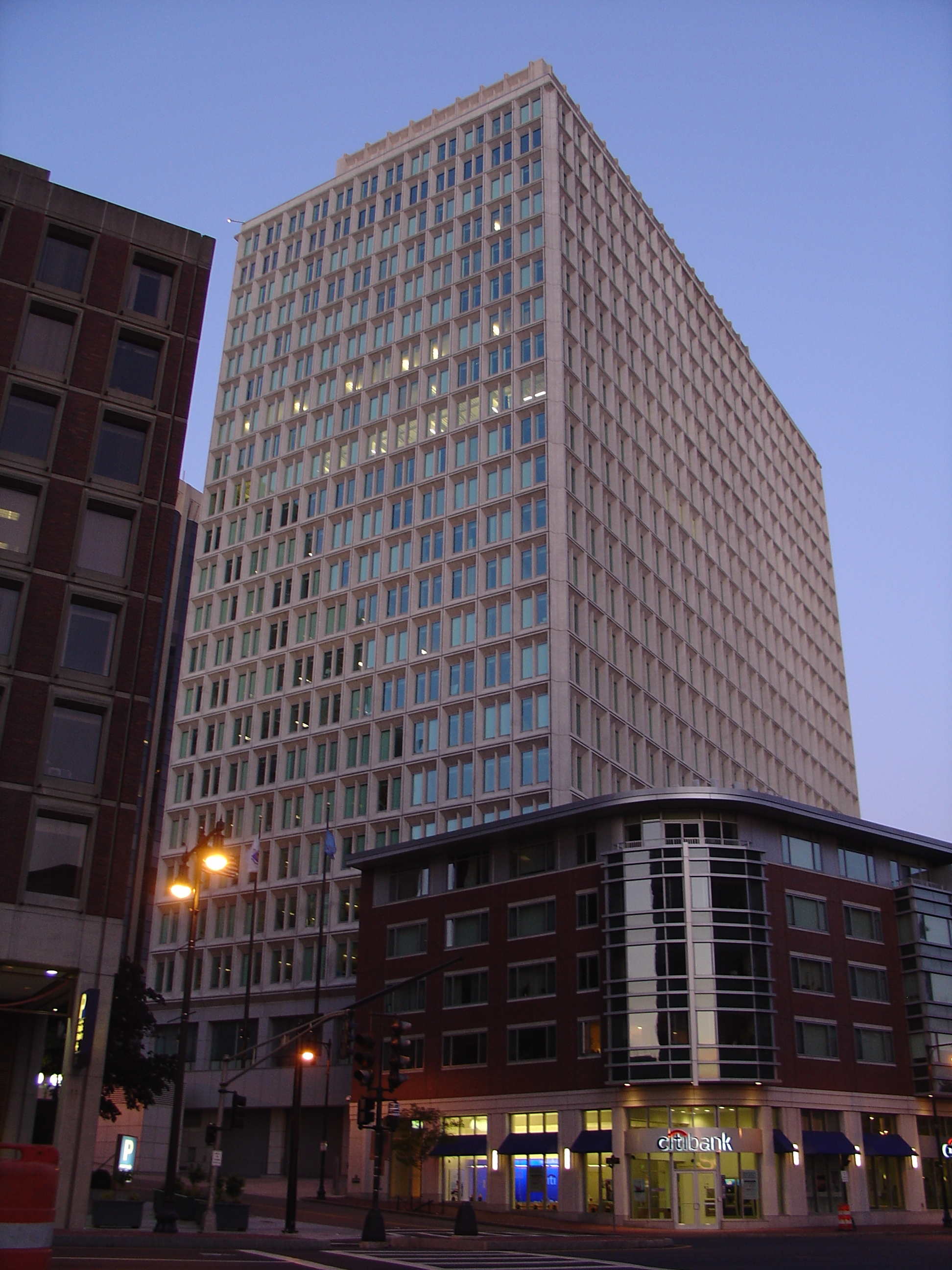
Saltonstall Building (100 Cambridge Street)

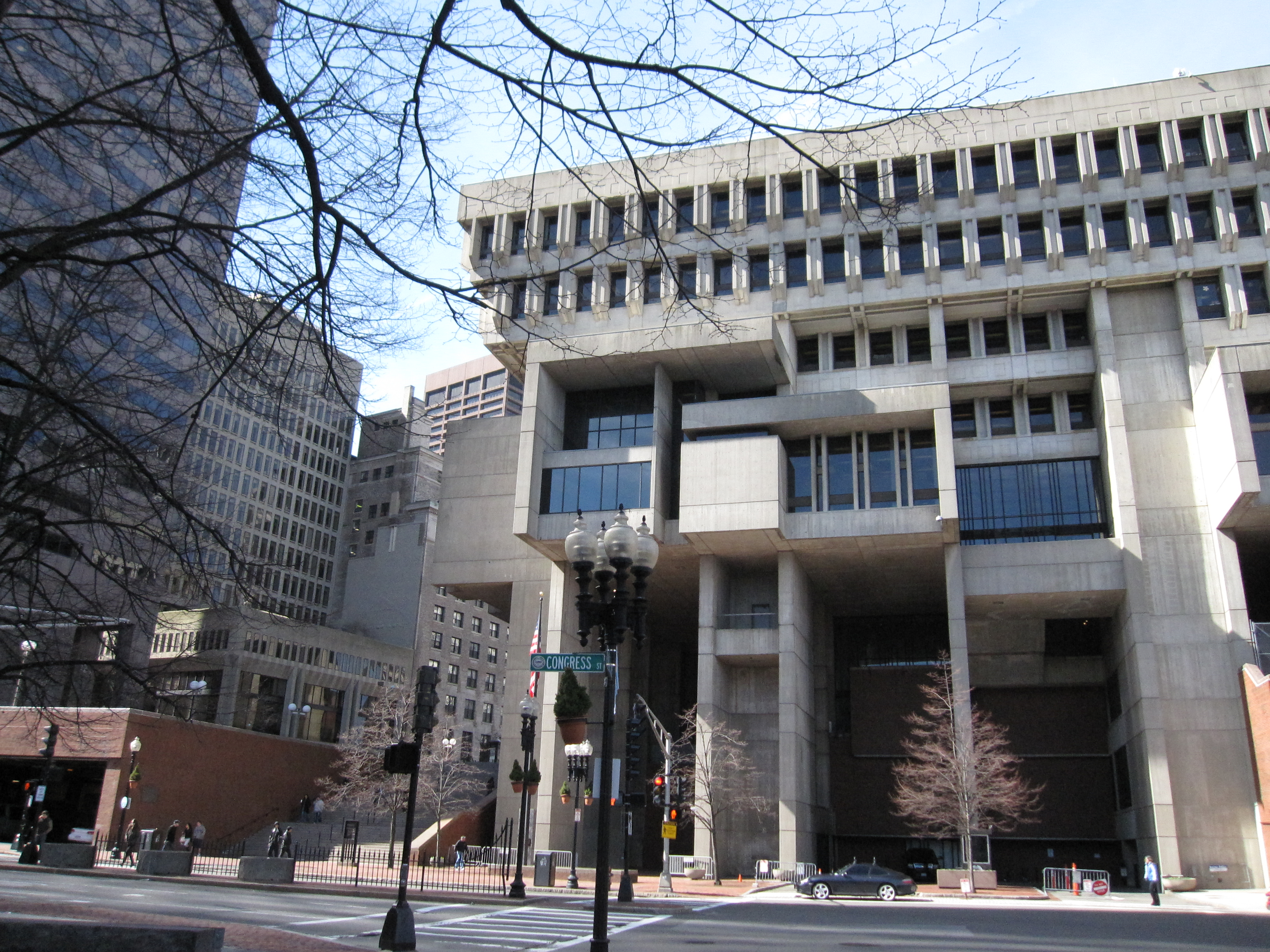
Boston City Hall

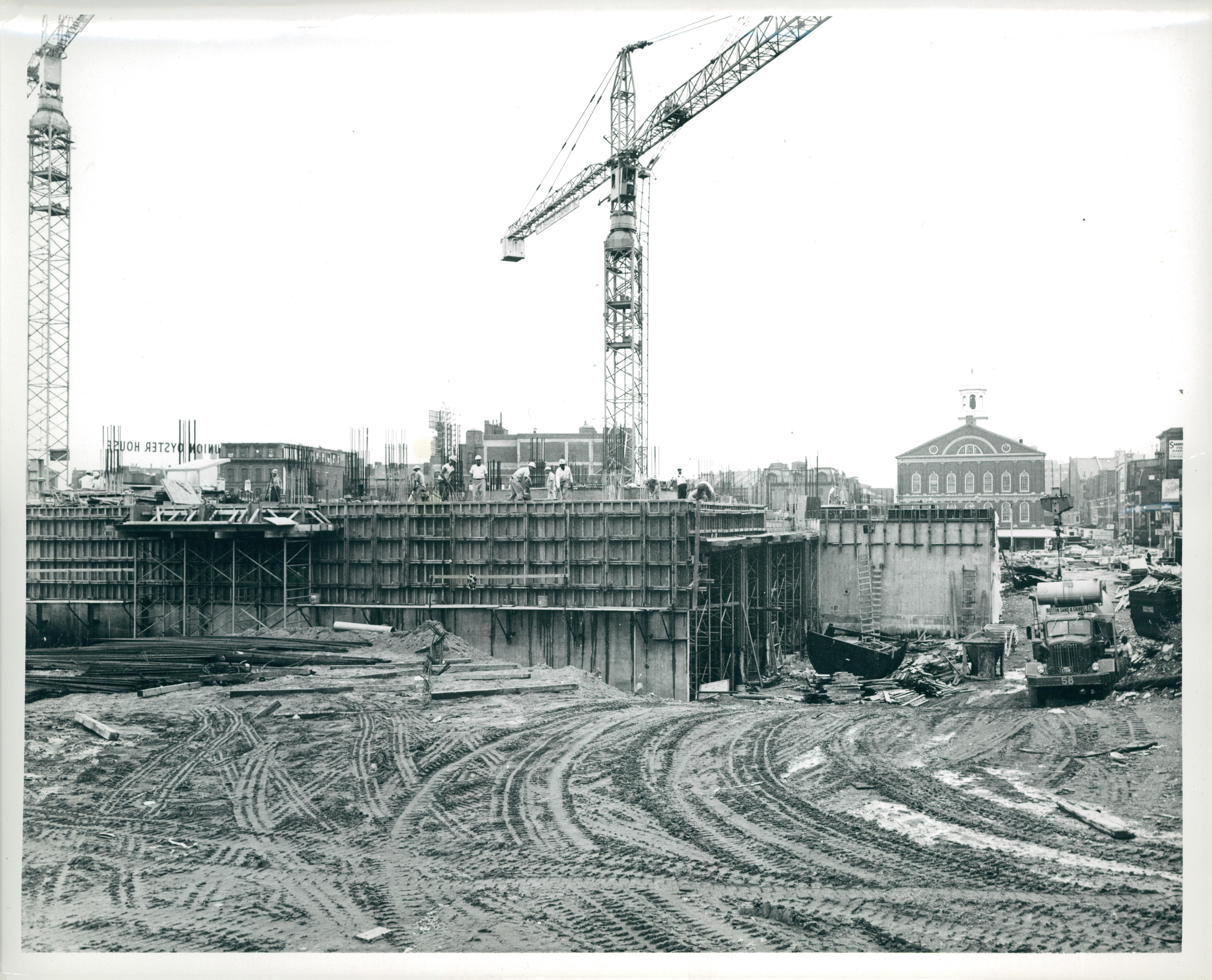
City Hall under construction in the 1960s

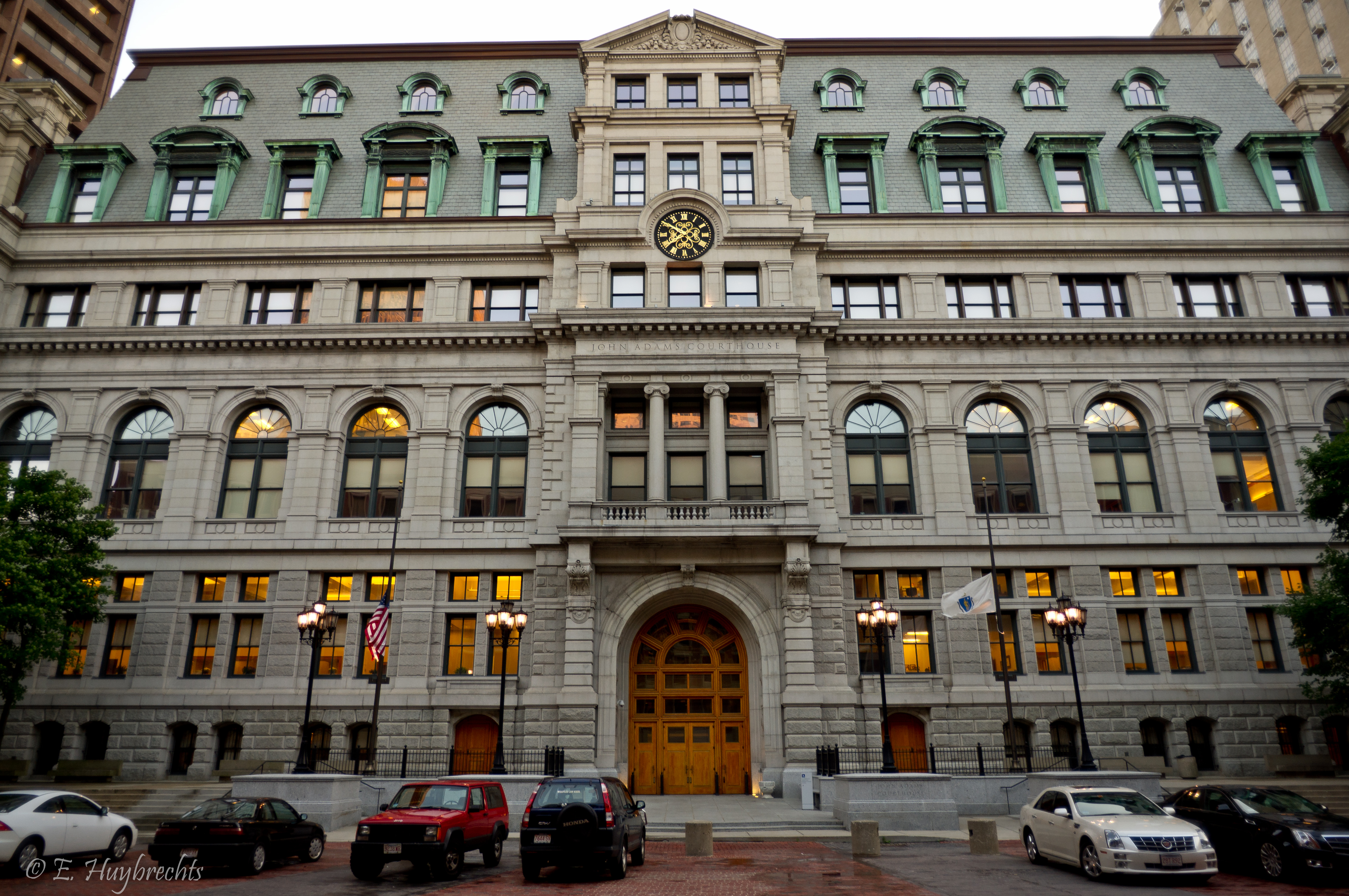
Suffolk County Courthouse

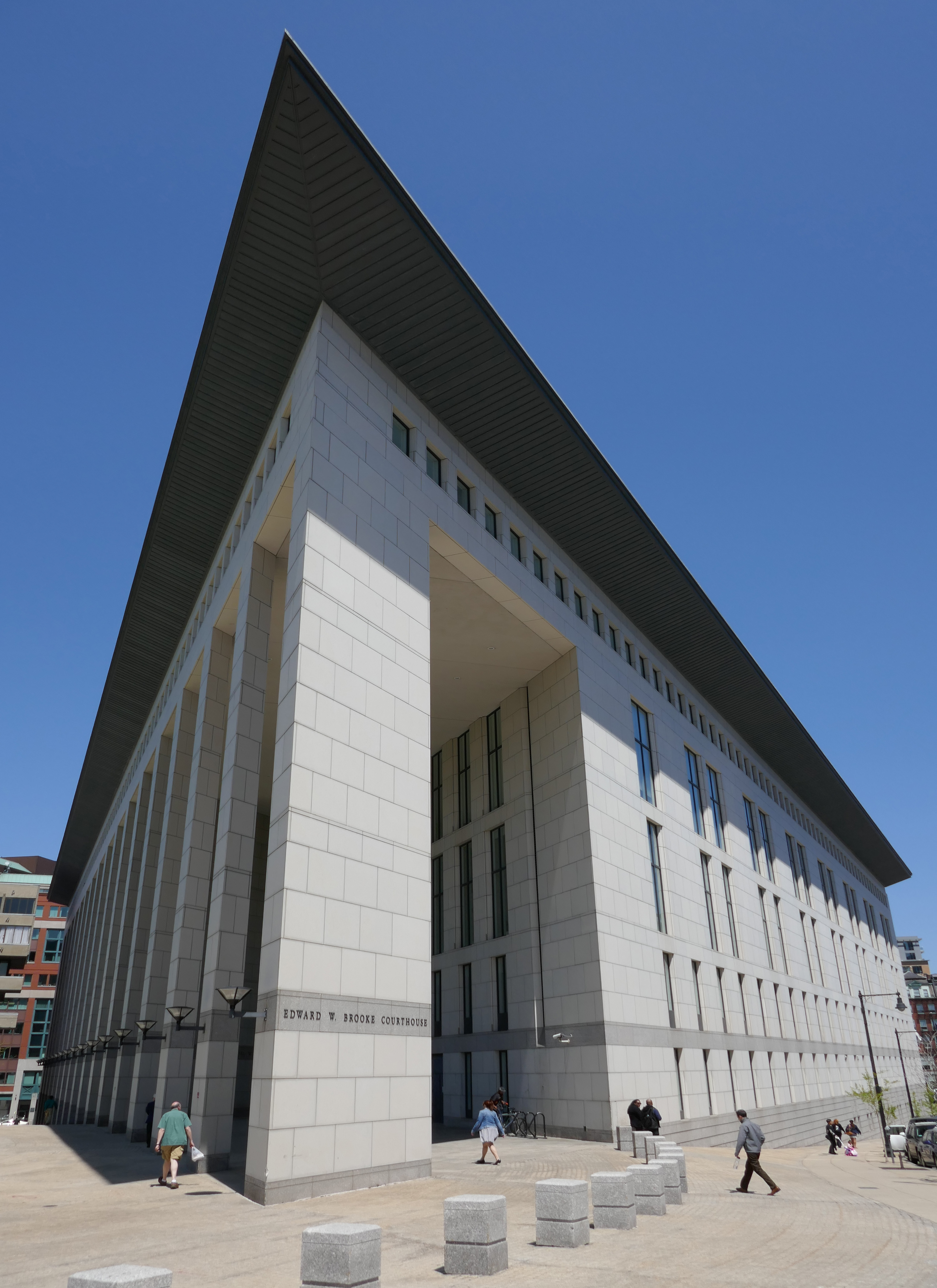
Edward W. Brooke Courthouse

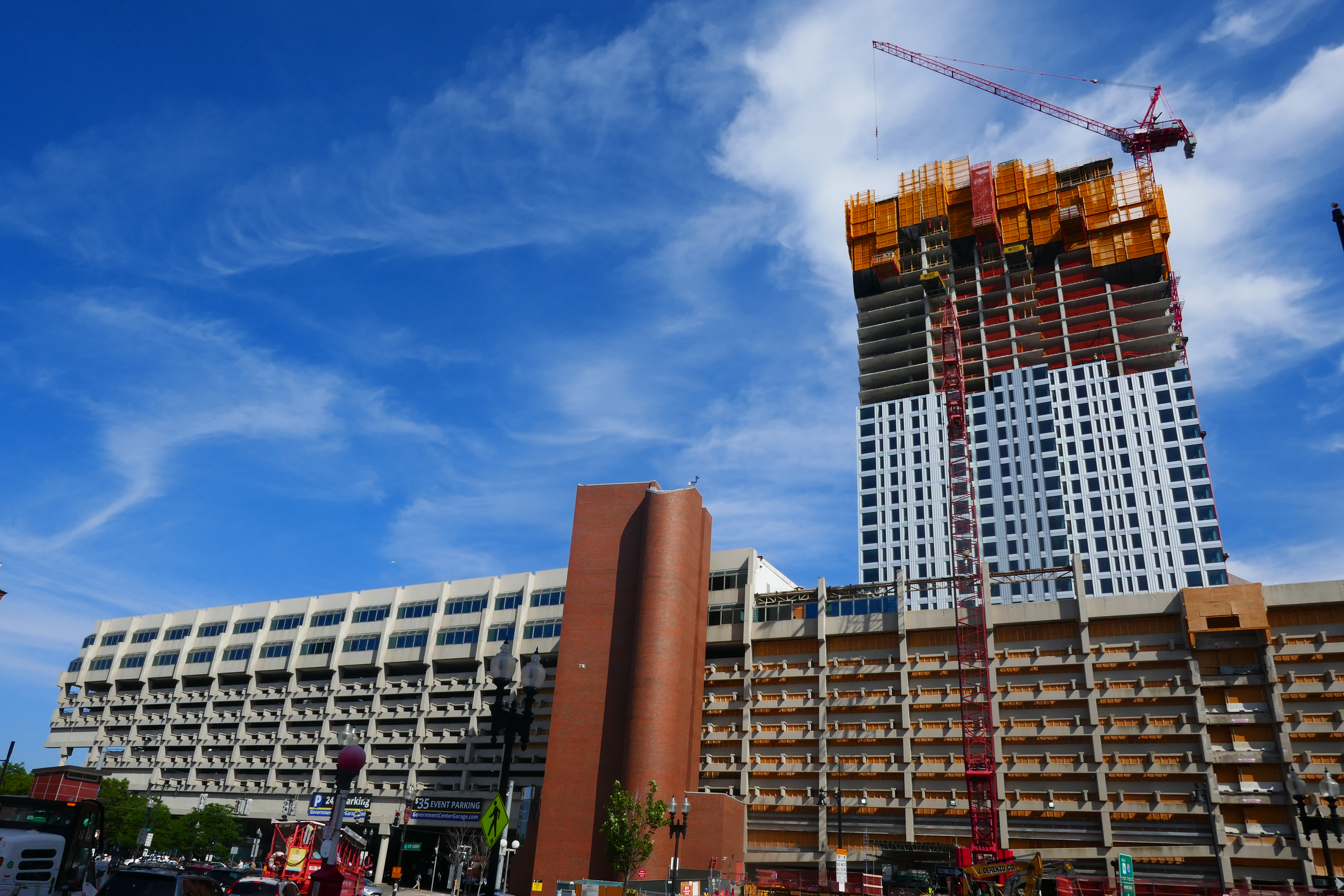
Government Center Garage during its redevelopment as Bulfinch Crossing, 2019

== See also ==
History of the site

- Brattle Street (Boston)
- Court Street (Boston)
- Hanover Street (Boston)
- Edward J. Logue
