= James W. Bradford =

American executive

- Born: James Warren Bradford; May 3, 1947
- Died: July 27, 2023; Nashville, Tennessee
- Education: University of Florida; Vanderbilt Law School
- Occupations: Businessman, academic
- Employer: Owen Graduate School of Management
- Known for: AFG Industries (President and Chief executive); United Glass Corporation(President and Chief executive)
- Board member of: Genesco, Granite Construction, Cracker Barrel, Sattler College
- Spouse: Susan Bradford

James W. Bradford (May 3, 1947 - July 27, 2023) was an American businessman and academic. He was the CEO of AFG Industries from 1992 to 1999 and the United Glass Corporation from 1999 to 2001. He was the dean of Vanderbilt University's Owen Graduate School of Management from 2004 to 2013. He has served on several corporate boards, including Clarcor, Granite Construction, Genesco and Cracker Barrel, where his credentials were questioned by the largest shareholder.

== Early life ==
James W. Bradford was born in 1948. He graduated from the University of Florida, where he earned a bachelor of arts degree in History and Political Science in 1969. He also earned a juris doctor from the Vanderbilt Law School in 1974.

== Career ==
Bradford was the president and chief executive officer of AFG Industries from 1992 to 1999 and United Glass Corporation from 1999 to September 2001.

Bradford joined Vanderbilt University's Owen Graduate School of Management in November 2002 as an adjunct professor. He was subsequently a clinical professor of management, acting dean and associate dean of corporate relations. From 2004 to 2013, he was Owen's dean, where he also taught as the Ralph Owen Professor for the Practice of Management.

Bradford served on the board of directors of Clarcor from January 20, 2006 to February 28, 2017. Upon stepping down, he earned more than $920,000 in stock options. He has served on the board of Genesco since October 26, 2005, and as its lead director since June 2012. Additionally, he has served on the boards of Granite Construction since January 2006 and Cracker Barrel since July 2011.

In October 2012, Sardar Biglari, the largest shareholder of Cracker Barrel, questioned his credentials to serve on the board.

Bradford served on the board of directors of the Nashville Capital Network. He served on the advisory board of Harpeth Capital. He was on the founding board for Sattler College.
