= Howard Athenaeum =

Theater in Boston, Massachusetts (1845–1953)

Coordinates: 42°21′33″N 71°03′37″W

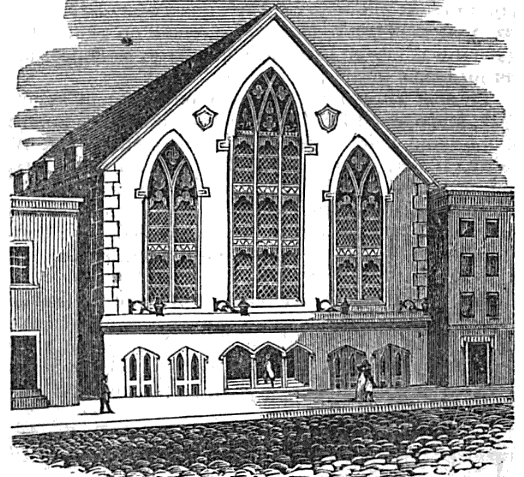
The Howard, Boston

The Howard Athenæum (1845–1953), also known as Old Howard Theatre, in Boston, Massachusetts, was one of the most famous theaters in Boston history. Founded in 1845, it remained an institution of culture and learning for most of its years, finally closing in 1953. It was demolished in 1962 after a fire in June 1961.

== History ==
Of all the theaters founded in Boston, the Howard Athenæum was one of the most famous as well as the most lamented. Popular throughout New England, the theater was affectionately called "The Old Howard." Built in 1843 as a church by the Millerite sect, the flimsy tent-like structure housed a small but loyal congregation who eventually abandoned the site following disappointment with the minister's promise that the world would end in 1844. After Armageddon failed to materialize, the founder of the sect, William Miller, an ex-Deputy Sheriff from Poultney, Vermont, was discredited and the Millerites moved on. The temple was then rebuilt as a playhouse in 1845, only to burn to the ground a few months later. In 1846 a new structure was designed by Isaiah Rogers in a Gothic-like style that was unique among American theaters. The new building, made of Quincy granite and capable of seating 1,360 patrons, was rushed to completion with the aid of funds from a local brewery. It reopened October 5, 1846, at 34 Howard Street in Scollay Square, the area that is now occupied by Boston's Government Center.

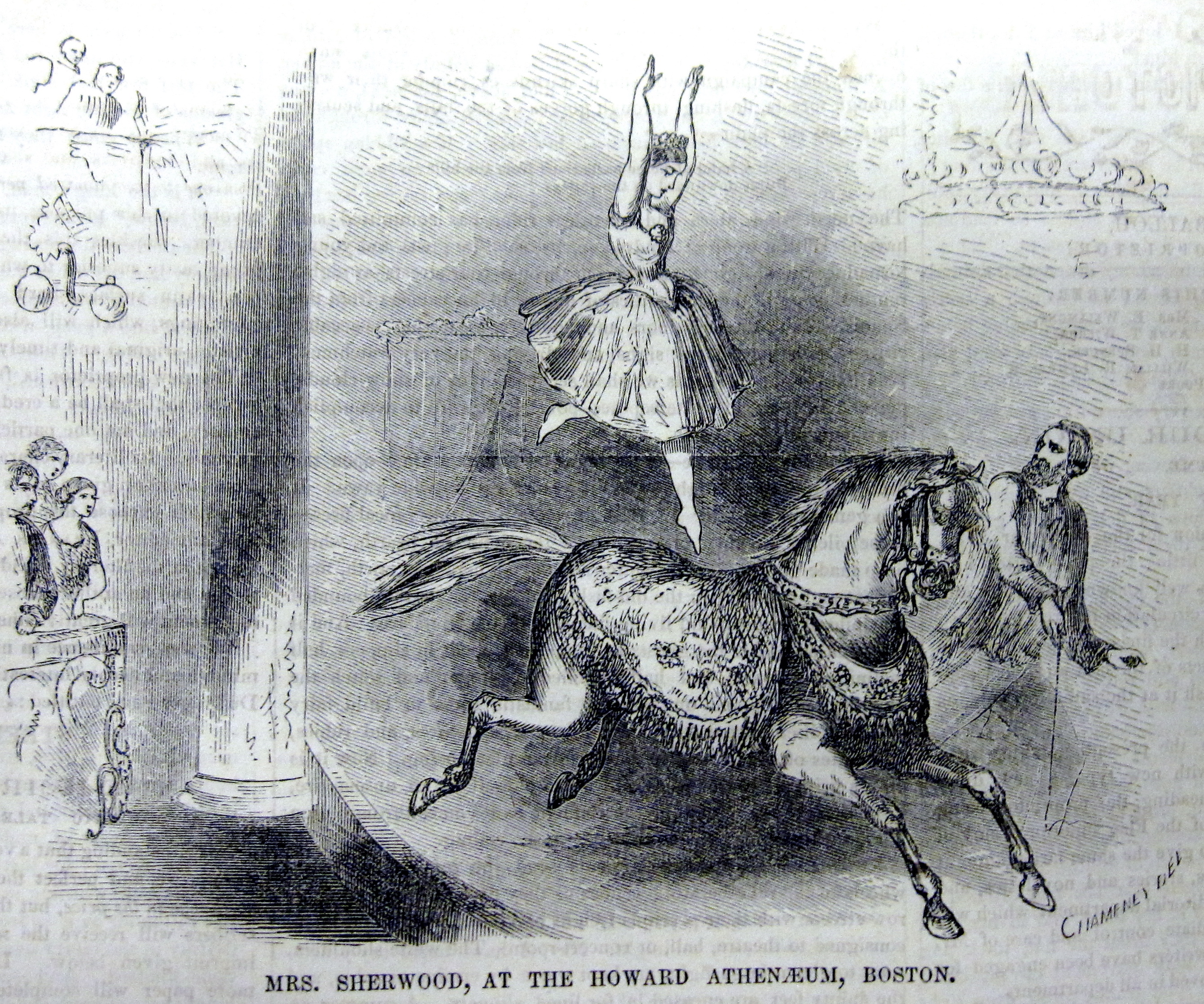
Mrs. Sherwood at the Howard Athenaeum, 1854.

For the first several decades of its existence, it successfully vied with the Boston Museum as that city's leading playhouse. While the Boston Museum relied heavily on its great stock company, the Howard became the home of leading touring actors. In an 1860 playbill, the Howard Athenaeum proudly announced that it hosted performances of "opera, tragedy, comedy, burlesque, vaudeville, minstrels, and magicians." Among the great names regularly appearing at the Howard were Edwin Booth, Charlotte Cushman and other stellar performers of that era, including a young John Wilkes Booth, who played Hamlet. The playhouse soon became famous for its opera productions: Verdi's Ernani, which had its American premier at the Howard in 1847, may have been Boston's first exposure to Italian bel canto opera. A program for the Ernani performance at the Howard is owned by the Boston Athenæum, which has a very small but interesting collection of programs from the Howard's early years dating from 1847 to 1848.

On opening night, the Boston Courier for October 13, 1845, had this to say:

"The Howard Athenaeum, a new candidate for patronage of the public, will be open tonight with a capital bill. The old tabernacle has been transformed into a very convenient and handsome theatre and it would sadly puzzle a Millerite to imagine himself at home in its now tasteful interior. Of the company, we can better speak after having seen one of their performances but the names of several old favorites warrant us in expecting good things. That the house will be crowded tonight to the utmost strength of its capacity may be considered certain."

Ballet, opera and serious drama would be the main fare at the Howard for the next twenty years and, on that first night, the Howard Athenaeum opened with a production of Richard Brinsley Sheridan's The School for Scandal. For the first four months of its life, the Howard seemed to enjoy a blessed existence, until on February 25, 1846, during a performance of Pizzaro, a ball of fire representing the sun set the scenery on fire and the building burned to the ground. However, the theatre reopened on October 5, 1846, with Richard Sheridan's The Rivals.

== Milestones ==
During its early period, the Howard Athenaeum played host to many performing superstars, among them was the eminent comedian William Warren, who was for years considered the top comedian in the nation. Scandal also surfaced when, on May 4, 1853, the Howard Athenaeum found itself under unfavorable national scrutiny. Sarah Parker Remond, a black anti-slavery activist and lecturer with the American Anti-Slavery Society (and later a medical doctor), had bought a ticket through the mail for the Donizetti opera, Don Pasquale, but, upon arriving, refused to sit in a segregated section for the show. She was forcibly removed and pushed down a flight of stairs. She eventually won a desegregation lawsuit against the managers of the Howard Athenaeum and received $500 in a settlement.

By the late 1860s, however, the theater had lost much of its audience to its more popular rivals the Boston Museum and the Boston Theatre and had begun presenting variety shows. In 1869, The Howard Athenaeum introduced an era of vaudeville with "Lydia Thomson and Her British Blondes.", By the end of the 19th century, the theatre had completely switched over to burlesque with performers such as Ann Corio, Sally Rand, Gypsy Rose Lee, and comedians including Fanny Brice, and Sophie Tucker, and "Tillie the Tassel." From its fashionable grand opera days in the mid-19th century, the Old Howard had become a tawdry establishment especially beloved by Harvard undergraduates for its strip-tease acts. President Kennedy was allegedly a regular patron of the Old Howard in his Harvard days (The Harvard class of 1937 even made Ann Corio an honorary member.) The Boston Phoenix for February 17, 2007, said: "the Howard hosted everyone in show biz from John Wilkes Booth to Phil Silvers to Minsky’s Burlesque star Ann Corio to an 'exotic Indian dancer' named Princess Lahoma." There were also a few vice raids. Other entertainers who appeared at the Howard include Abbott & Costello, Jimmy Durante, Fred Allen, W. C. Fields, Jackie Gleason, Al Jolson, Buster Keaton, Bert Lahr and Jerry Lewis. Boxers John L. Sullivan and Rocky Marciano gave boxing demonstrations on the stage. During this era of burlesque and variety, the Howard would advertise: "There is always something doing at the Old Howard."

== After the show was over ==
As the burlesque performances got more risqué with each year, the Boston vice squad made the Old Howard the object of their attention. The Boston Vice squad made a 16 mm film during one of their raids in 1953 and captured on film the performance of "Irma the Body" (real name: Mary Goodneighbor). This film footage resulted in an indecency hearing which eventually led to the closing of the Old Howard in 1953.

Due to the indecency charges, the city of Boston refused to renew the Old Howard's license in 1953, so the auditorium was dark for nearly a decade. In 1960 the Howard National Theatre and Museum Committee was formed to raise $1,500,000 to refurbish “Boston's most celebrated theatre” and restore it to the legitimate fold. However, before the committee could realize its ambition, the building had a small but not devastating fire. Though many people supported the push for a complete renovation, the city tore the building down promptly after the fire before anybody could protest. This controversial incident occurred at the height of Boston's urban renewal initiative and not much was considered historic except colonial-era structures.

A sign from The Old Howard is preserved today in the Emerson Umbrella in Concord, Massachusetts.

== Chronology of performances and events at the Howard Athenaeum ==
Dates	Event	Notables	Of Interest
October 13, 1845	The School for Scandal	Written by Richard Sheridan	Opening night – sell-out crowd
February 25, 1846	Pizarro		Fire burned down theater
1847	Verdi's Ernani		American Premier of Verdi's Ernani
April 28, 1847	Linda de Chamounix	A lyrical drama in three acts	American Premier of Linda de Chamounix
May 1, 1847	Norma: A Grand Lyrical Tragedy	Written by Bellini	Performed by the Italian Opera Company
1850	MacBeth	Charlotte Cushman as Lady MacBeth	
1853	Don Pasquale Opera		Sara Parker Remond lawsuit
December 1, 1853	Cymbeline	Mrs. T.S. Hamblin, Actress	-
1857	The Rights of Man	Written by Oliver S. Leland	
1860	Pilot of Brest	Play	
May 4, 1860	The Romance of a Poor Young Man	Mrs. William H. Smith, Actress	
1861	Richelieu	Charles Barron, Actor	
July 15, 1862	Adah Isaacs Menken	Dancer	
December 8, 1862	Leah, the Forsaken	Charles Barron, Actor	Augustin Daly's adaptation of "Deborah"
March 1, 1880	Uncle Tom's Cabin	Written by Harriet Beecher Stowe	
March 21, 1881	Gifford's Luck	Written by Charles Hoyt	A tragic melodrama
January 9, 1886	Two John's		
January 1, 1894	Olio: The Kouta-Kouta Dancers	Directed by Mme. Carre	
December 3, 1951	Georgia Sothern	Burlesque	

== Image gallery ==
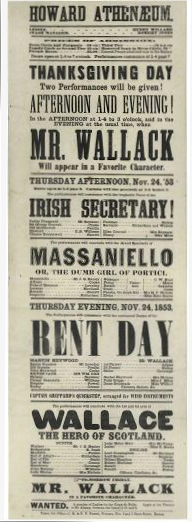
1853 advertisement

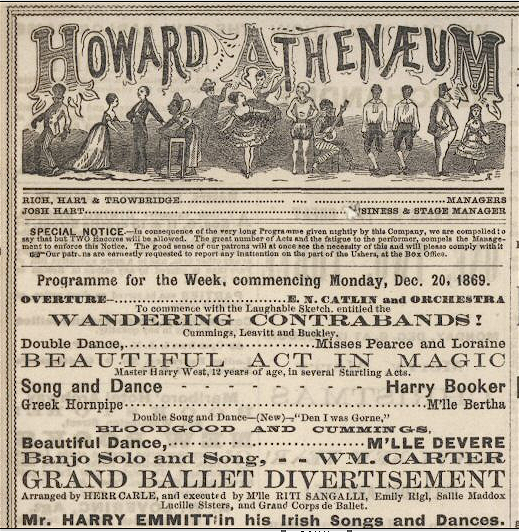
1869 advertisement

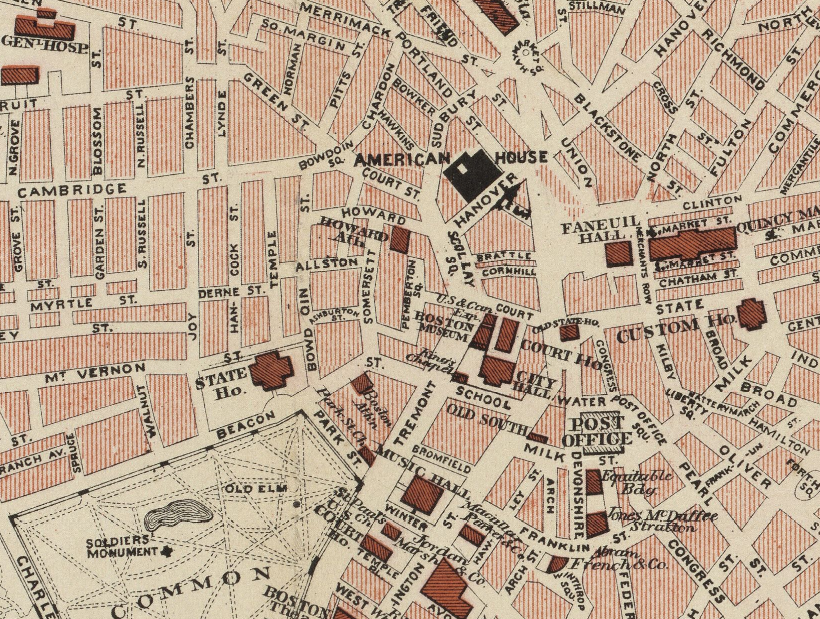
Detail of 1883 map of Boston, showing location of the Howard

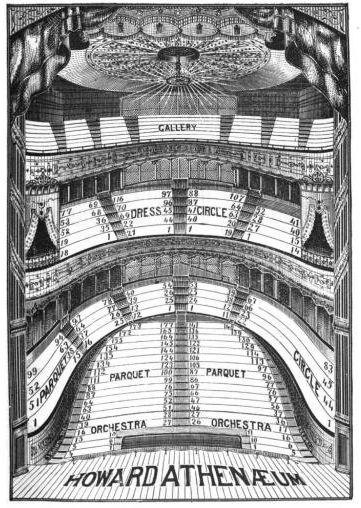
Theatre interior
