= 100 Cambridge Street =

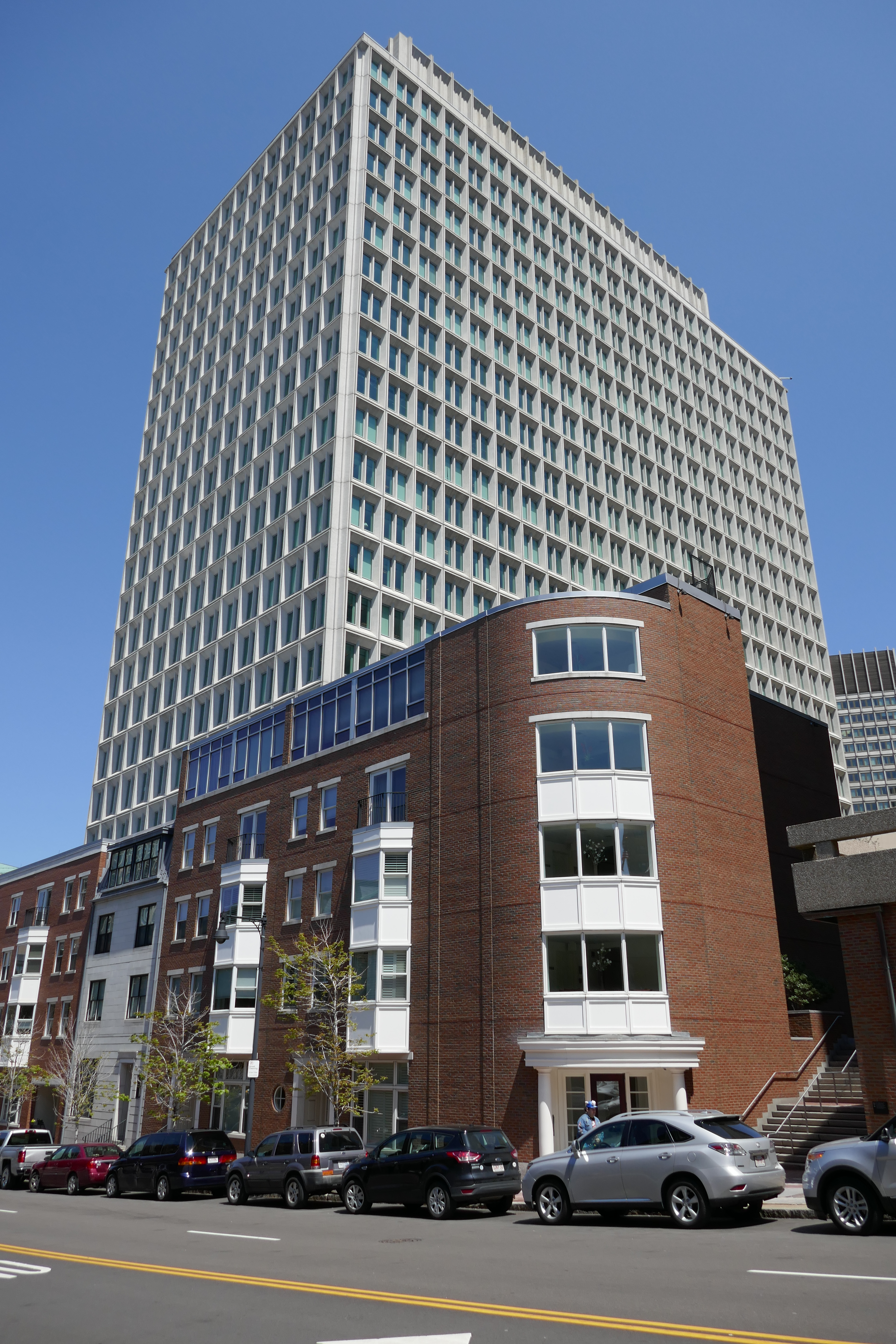
- Interactive map of the 100 Cambridge Street area

General information
- Type: Office, retail, residential
- Location: 100 Cambridge Street; Boston, Massachusetts
- Coordinates: 42.36032°N 71.06215°W
- Completed: 1971
- Renovated: 1999–2002

Height
- Roof: 396 ft (121 m)

Technical details
- Floor count: 22

Design and construction
- Architect: Emery Roth & Sons
- Developer: I.M. Pei & Partners

100 Cambridge Street, formerly the Leverett Saltonstall Building, is a high-rise building located in the Government Center district of Boston, Massachusetts. The building stands at 396 feet (121 m) with 22 floors. It was completed in 1965 and underwent major renovation and expansion in the early 2000s. The architectural firm that designed the building was Emery Roth & Sons. The building is notable for its distinctive International style architecture. The building was named in 1969 for former Massachusetts governor and United States Senator Leverett Saltonstall until its closure in 1999. When first opened it housed state offices; it now houses a mix of residential, commercial, and state tenants. Since October 2017, it has been the home of Sattler College.

== Cleanup and expansion ==
The building was closed in 1999 for a two-year cleanup after asbestos was found in the building's air. Prior to the renovation, it was occupied by state agencies. The $184 million project also included construction of a new, five-story structure wrapped around the base of the tower. The new structure included 34,500 square feet (3,210 m^{2}) of retail space, 56 market-rate condominiums, and 19 units of affordable housing. After the renovation, about half of the building's office space was rented to private tenants.

The rest of the office space is used by Massachusetts state agencies. In 2015, the state sold the ground lease on the building for $280 million to the Intercontinental Real Estate Corporation. The building is now known as "100 Cambridge Street."
