= Sattler College =

Christian college in Boston, Massachusetts

Coordinates: 42.3605°N 71.0623°W

- Motto: οὐ γὰρ ἔδωκεν ἡμῖν ὁ Θεὸς πνεῦμα δειλίας, ἀλλὰ δυνάμεως καὶ ἀγάπης καὶ σωφρονισμοῦ.
- Motto in English: "For God has not given us a spirit of cowardice, but of power, love, and a sound mind."
- Type: Private
- Established: 2016
- Religious affiliation: Nondenominational
- Dean: Hans Leaman
- President (Interim President): Finny Kuruvilla
- Faculty: 15 in 2023
- Students: 93 in 2023
- Location: 100 Cambridge Street, 17th Floor, Boston, MA 02114, U.S.
- Campus: Urban office building 29,000 square feet (2,700 m^{2}) plus
- Website: www.sattler.edu

Sattler College is a private college in Boston, Massachusetts, that associates itself with "the historic Christian faith." Opened in 2018, the college aims to "equip Jesus' peaceful revolution" through relational discipleship and academic excellence. The school was founded by Dr. Finny Kuruvilla (former research fellow at the Broad Institute of Harvard and MIT).

The first president of the college was Dr. James W. Bradford. In 2019, he was replaced by Dean Taylor. In 2022, Zack Johnson succeeded him, and in 2025, Dr. Finny Kuruvilla assumed the role of interim president.

Named for sixteenth-century Anabaptist Christian martyr Michael Sattler, the school welcomed its first class in the fall of 2018, received national accreditation in 2021, and graduated its first class in May 2022. Projected external funding for the school is $30 million over the course of 25 years. Its campus is in a high-rise office building in downtown Boston, overlooking the Charles River and Massachusetts State House.

== History ==
In 2015, Dr. Finny Kuruvilla presented his idea of a college with "a comprehensive curriculum and beautiful campus overlooking the Boston Harbor... no traditional campus would offer a first-class education for only $9,000 each year." He brought together a board of 6 people including 2 with PhDs from Ivy League schools and 2 with law degrees. In December 2016, the Massachusetts Board of Higher Education allowed the college to begin granting undergraduate degrees and exist as an autonomous institution. Sattler College's first application opened in October 2017 and it began its first semester with students in the fall of 2018.

=== Campus ===
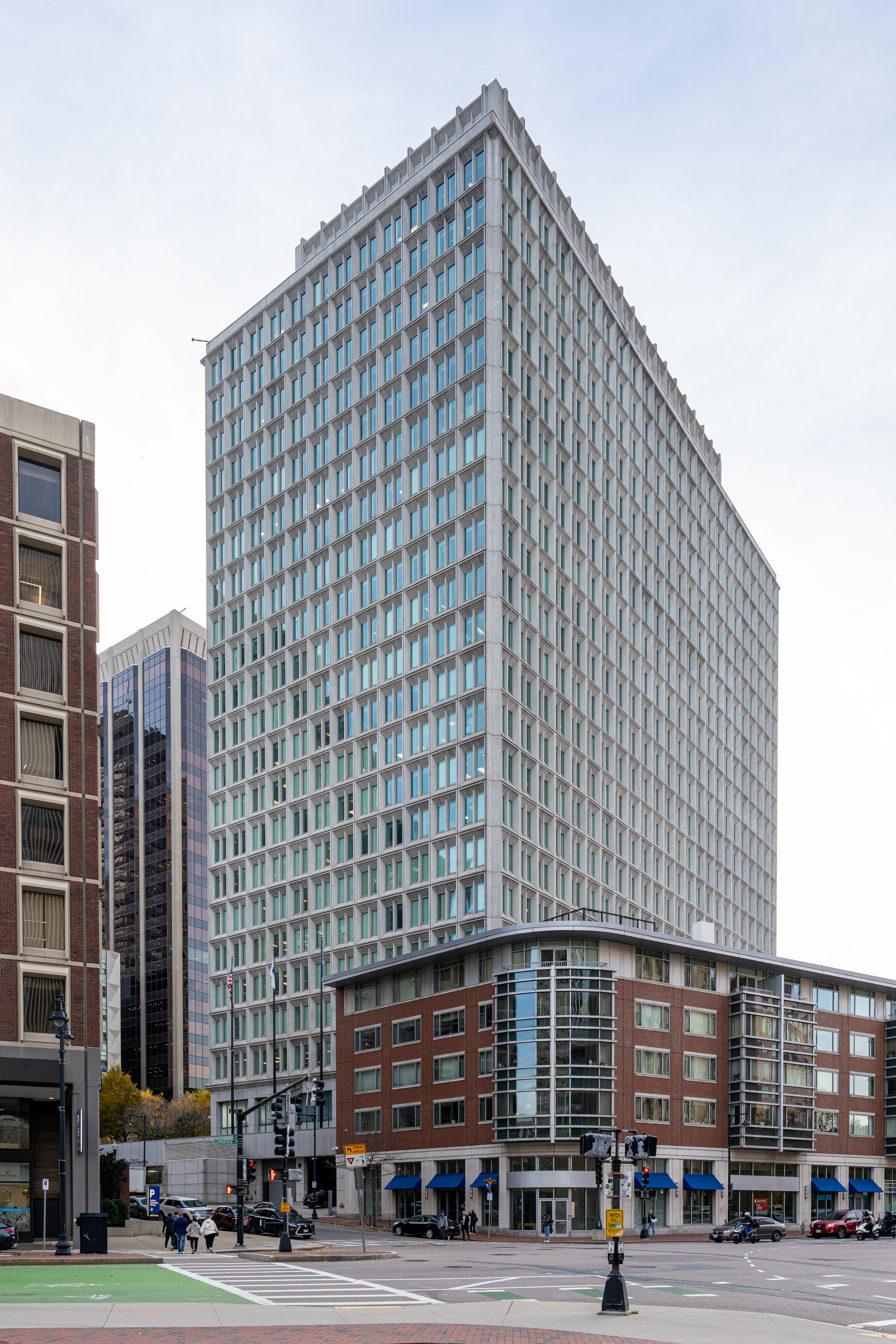
100 Cambridge Street

On October 26, 2017, the college announced that it had secured the 17th floor of the Leverett Saltonstall Building for its first campus. It is located in downtown Boston in Beacon Hill. The college says that it had no plans for building science labs. Instead, they plan "to have students take laboratory courses through the Harvard University Extension School, Northeastern University’s College of Professional Studies, or elsewhere and transfer credits back to Sattler." The college leases out dormitories to its students to provide housing options.

=== Entrustment tuition ===
As of 2026, the college does not charge tuition according to the traditional model.

== Academics ==
=== Academic model ===
Classes are primarily discussion-based, with briefer lectures and greater student involvement.

Instead of having a library of their own, Sattler utilizes the Boston Public Library for its students. Sattler also provides electronic library resources by subscribing to the eBook services provided by two leading digital library service providers: Proquest (ebrary) and EBSCO." As of 2025, Sattler College has a small physical library located on the campus.

=== Degree programs ===
In its December 2016 decision, the Massachusetts Board of Higher Education granted Sattler College the ability to grant the following degrees:

- Bachelor of Science in Business
- Bachelor of Science in Computer Science
- Bachelor of Science in Human Biology
- Bachelor of Arts in Biblical and Religious Studies
- Bachelor of Arts in History

The college has announced that, "within ten years [by 2028], we plan to seek authorization to also offer programs in Civil Engineering, English, Education, Journalism, Mathematics, Physics, and Social Sciences."

Sattler College additionally offers one-year certificates in the liberal arts and in biblical and religious studies.

== Religious affiliation ==
The college is named after Michael Sattler, a sixteenth-century Anabaptist Christian martyr. Though the school is aligned with the theology of Conservative Anabaptism and is closely connected to and associated with the local Followers of The Way church, it is not affiliated with a particular denomination. Sattler College espouses principles from the early church and looks to the example of persecuted Christians. Drawing on the nonviolence expressed by Michael Sattler and his contemporaries, Sattler College believes in the power of redemptive love, emulating portions of the ante-Nicene church and Anabaptist groups by practicing nonviolence.

== Core values ==
One of Sattler College's self-proclaimed distinctives is its focus on "The Three Cs": Core, Christian Character, and Cost.

In setting the curriculum, Kuruvilla looked to the first US colleges such as Harvard and Yale, where the first students there had to show proficiency in Bible literature and languages. In this spirit, students are required to take religion courses on Christianity. These courses include learning Old Testament Hebrew and New Testament Greek, church history, and studying the basics of Christianity.

Sattler also requires students to complete an extensive core curriculum based on the liberal arts, including classes in writing, history, biology, and mathematics, as well as their major-specific courses. The college also focuses on students' Christian development through "wise study, mentoring, and discipleship."
