= Crawford House (Boston, Massachusetts) =

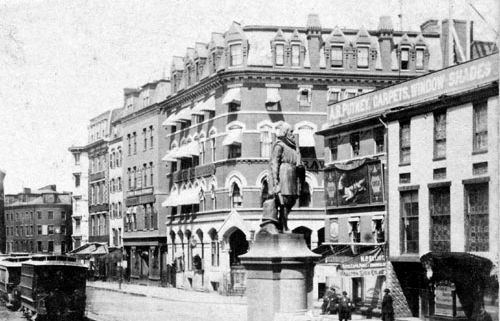
- The Crawford House (center, with window awnings), 1877

- Location within Boston

General information
- Type: Hotel
- Location: 81-85 Court Street, 9-17 Brattle Street; Boston, Massachusetts; United States
- Coordinates: 42.3598°N 71.0595°W
- Opened: 1865
- Renovated: 1874; 1926
- Demolished: 1950 (Hotel); 1962 (Theater)

Technical details
- Floor count: 6
- Floor area: 7,900 sq ft (730 m^{2})

Design and construction
- Architect: Joseph R. Richards

Other information
- Number of rooms: 100 (approx.)

The Crawford House was a hotel and restaurant in downtown Boston, Massachusetts. Located on Court and Brattle Streets in Scollay Square, it was in operation during the late nineteenth and early twentieth centuries, and was for a time among the leading hotels in the city. The building was demolished in 1962 as part of the Government Center project.

== History ==
The Crawford House was originally opened in December 1865, as a café on Brattle Street. In 1873 the owners decided to build a new hotel on the premises and undertook a substantial expansion of the building, adding several stories and extending it west to Court Street. The hotel was completed in the following year and opened on March 10, 1874. It was further enlarged around 1886, when it merged with the nearby Carelton House on Hanover Street. Following the merger, the Crawford had a capacity of 450 guests.

In 1926, the portion of the Crawford House facing Court Street was seized by the city via eminent domain in order to widen Cambridge and Court Streets, and the front wall on that side was torn down. As a result, the hotel temporarily closed on April 17, 1926. The remaining part of the building was subsequently taken over by new management and underwent a period of remodeling. The hotel reopened on December 4, at which time the upper floors had approximately 100 guest rooms. The ground floor was occupied by a theater, which opened soon after.

During the 1930s and 1940s, the Crawford House theater was considered a landmark of Scollay Square; it served as a venue for numerous local dancers, musicians and comedians. It gained particular fame during this period as the home of Sally Keith, a prominent burlesque performer in the city.

The Crawford House hotel was permanently closed after the building was damaged by a fire on March 23, 1948. In January 1950 the third through sixth floors of the hotel were demolished, but the first and second floors were retained and the theater was kept open. The truncated building remained in operation until the early 1960s, when the city cleared the Scollay Square area to make way for the new City Hall Plaza.

== Images ==
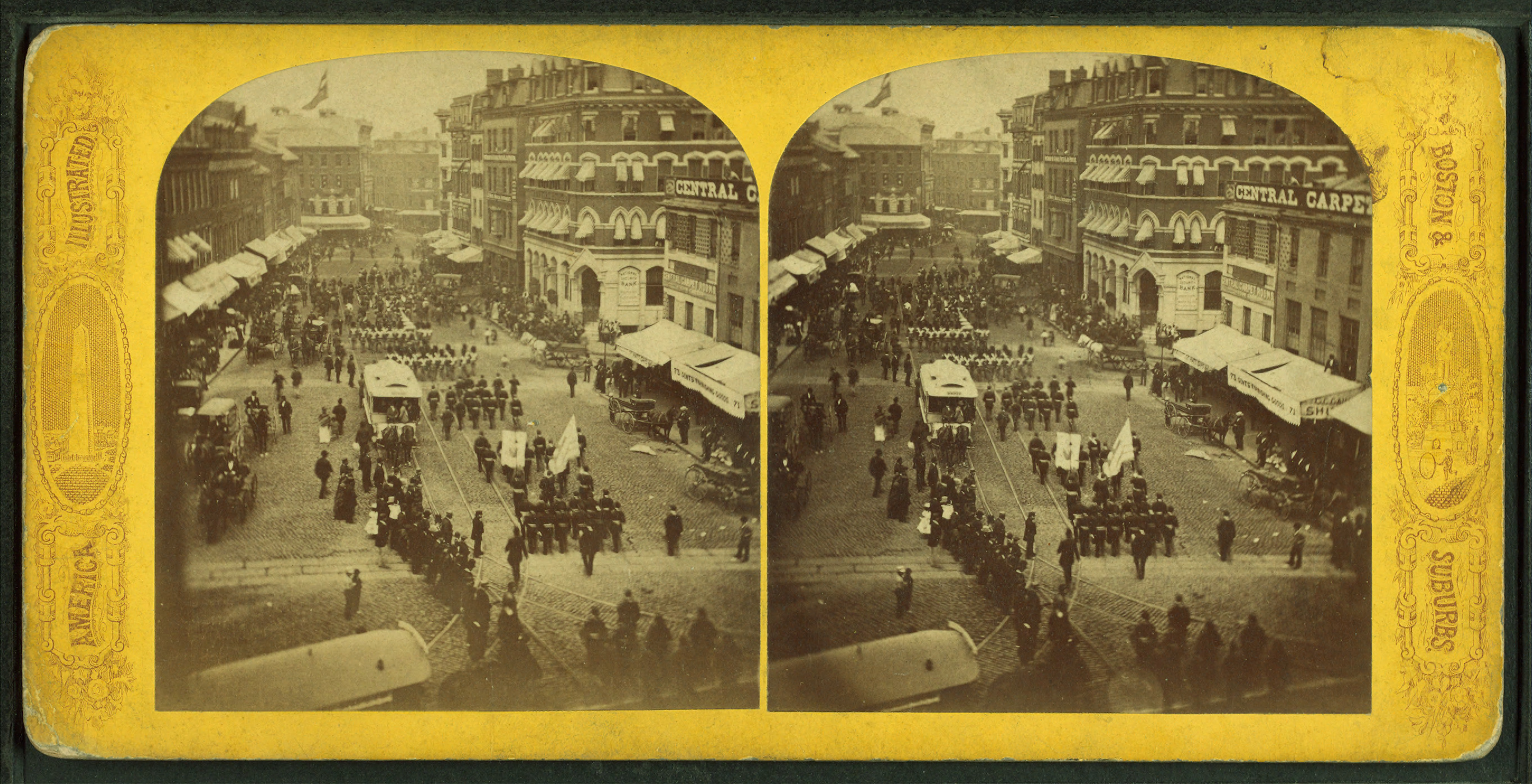
Crawford House (upper right), c. 1800s

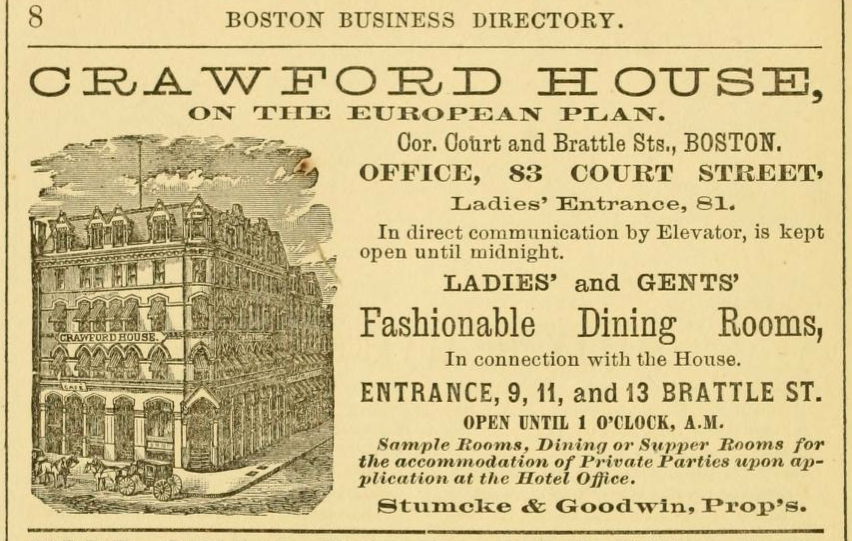
Crawford House, 1879 advertisement

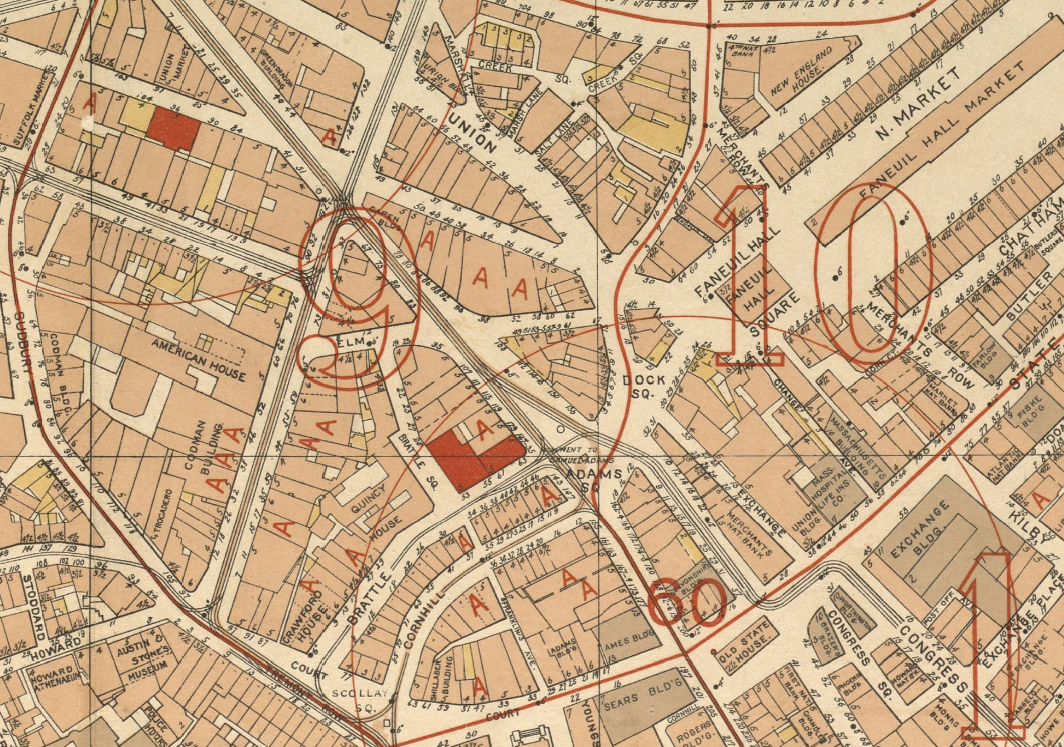
Map of Boston, showing location of the Crawford House (lower left), 1896

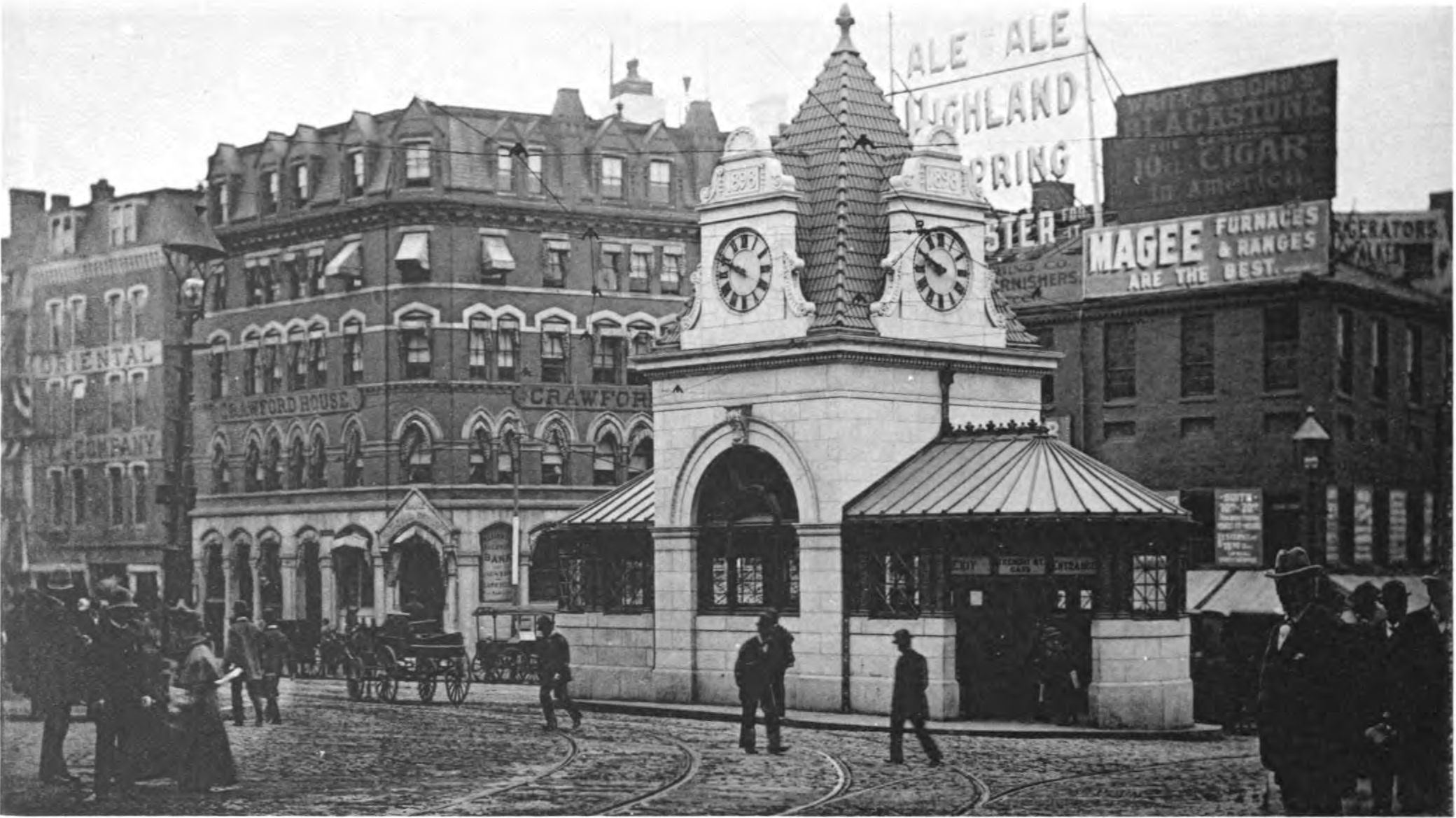
Crawford House, 1898

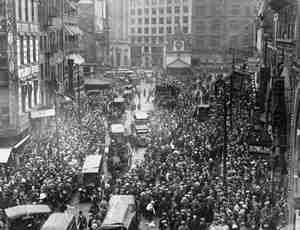
Crawford House (left, with window awnings) during the Boston Police Strike, 1919
