= Scollay Square =

Former public square in Boston, Massachusetts

Coordinates: 42°21′34″N 71°03′34″W

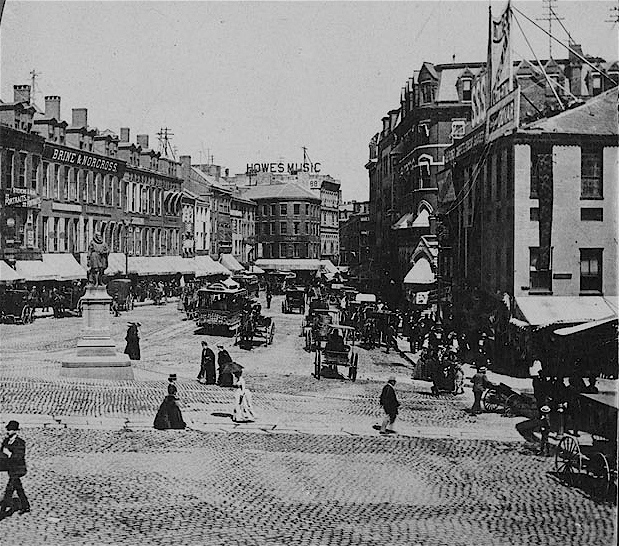
Scollay Square, Boston, 19th century (after September 1880)

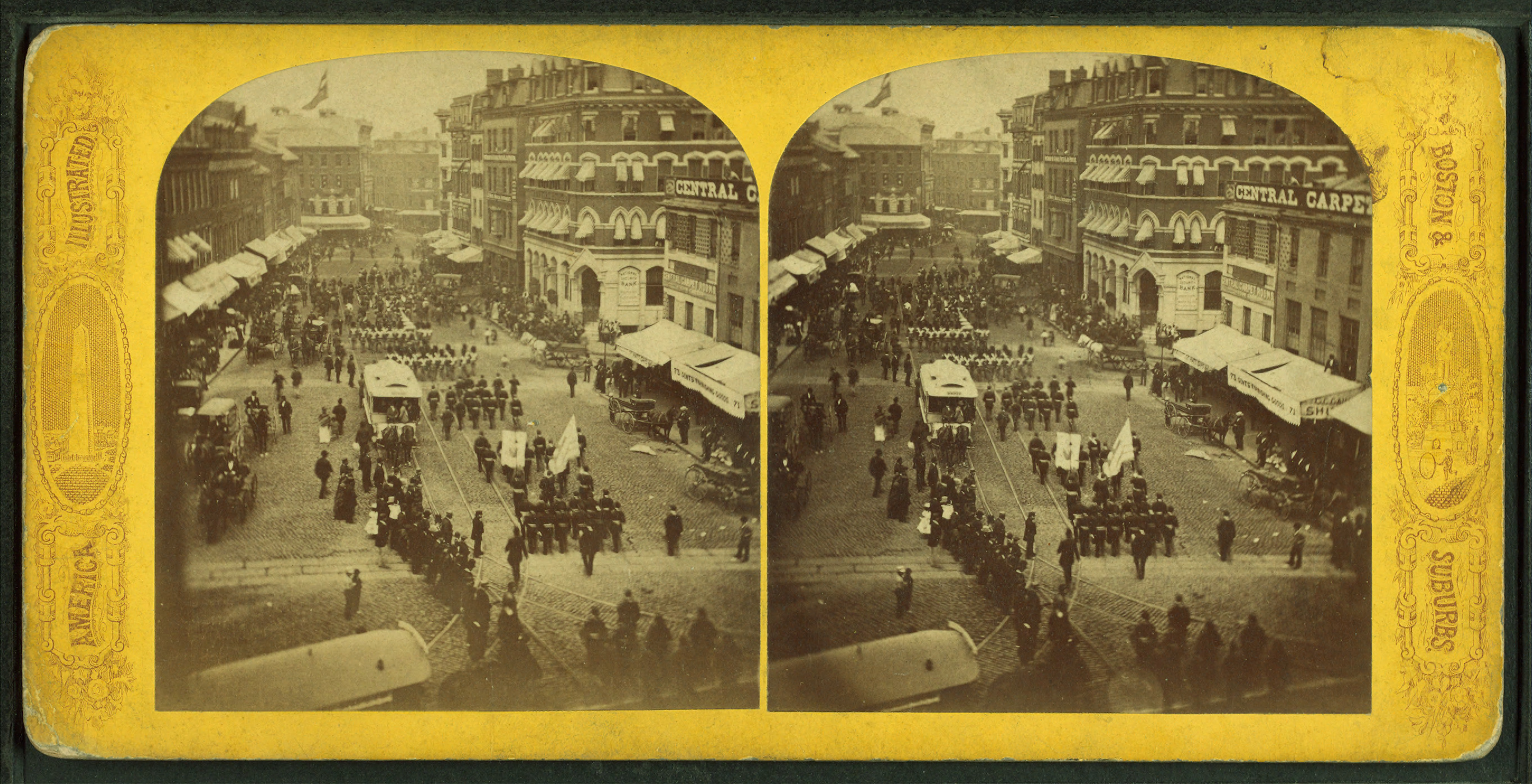
Scollay Square, Decoration Day, 19th century (after September 1880)

Scollay Square (c. 1838–1962) was a city square in downtown Boston, Massachusetts. It was named for William Scollay, a prominent local developer and militia officer who bought a four-story merchant building at the intersection of Cambridge and Court Streets in the year 1795. Local citizens began to refer to this intersection as Scollay's Square, and, in 1838, the city officially memorialized the intersection as the Scollay Square. Early on, the area was a busy center of commerce, including daguerreotypist (photographer) Josiah Johnson Hawes (1808–1901) and Dr. William Thomas Green Morton, the first dentist to use ether as an anaesthetic.

As early as the 1950s city officials had been mulling plans to completely tear the Square down and redevelop the area. Eventually more than 1,000 buildings were demolished and 20,000 residents were displaced. With $40 million in federal funds, the city built an entirely new development there, Government Center.

== History ==
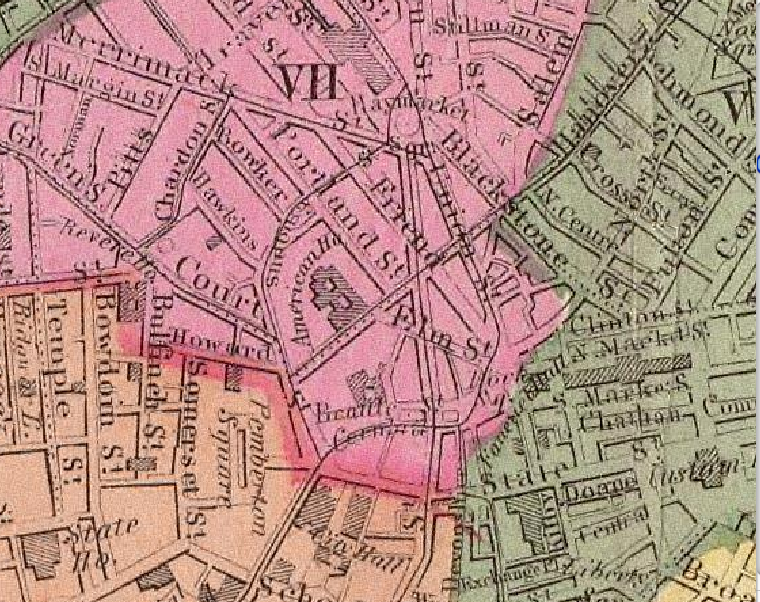
Detail of 1888 map of Boston, showing vicinity of Scollay Square

Scollay Square was located "at the junction of Tremont and Court streets, Cornhill and Tremont Row". Initially the city designated it Pemberton Square, but changed the name to "Scollay Square" when Phillips Square changed its own name to "Pemberton Square". The building that gave the area its name, Scollay's Building, was the last remnant of a once-larger group of buildings: "at one time a wedge-shaped row of wooden buildings, extending from the head of Cornhill to opposite the head of Hanover street, separated Tremont row from Court street (see Bonner's map, 1722); at the southeasterly end the second schoolhouse in the town was erected, 1683–1684; at various times portions of these buildings were removed, leaving only the Scollay brick building, supposed to have been built by Patrick Jeffrey, who came into possession in 1795; named for William Scollay, an apothecary ... removed about 1870."

=== Culture ===
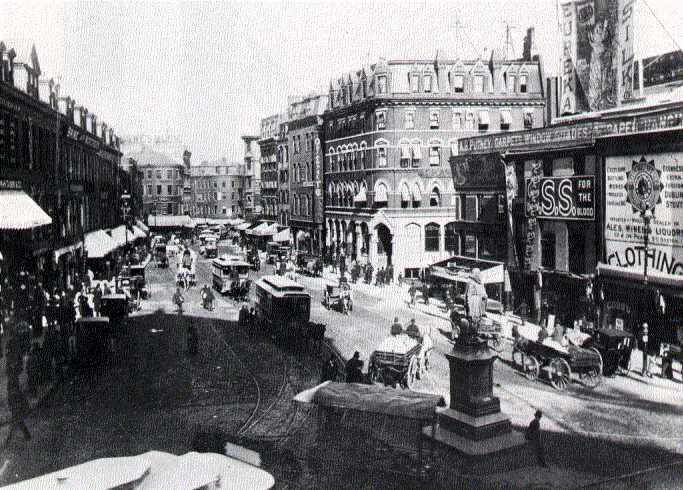
Scollay Square, Boston, after September 1880

==== Old Howard Theatre ====
Among the most famous (and infamous) of Scollay Square landmarks was the Old Howard Theatre, a grand theater which began life as the headquarters of a Millerite Adventist Christian sect which believed the world would end in October 1844. After the world failed to end on schedule, the building was sold in 1844 and reopened as a vaudeville and Shakespearean venue. Later, in the 1900s and 1910s, it would showcase the popular minstrel shows.

By around the 1940s the Scollay Square area began to lose its vibrant commercial activity, and the Howard gradually changed its image and began to cater to sailors on leave and college students by including burlesque shows, as did other nearby venues such as the Casino Theater and Crawford House. "Always Something Doing" became the Old Howard's advertising slogan. The venue also showcased boxing matches with boxers including Rocky Marciano, and continued to feature slapstick vaudeville acts, from likes of The Marx Brothers and Abbott and Costello.

But it was the success and prominence of the burlesque shows that brought the Old Howard down. In 1953, vice squad agents snuck a home movie camera into the Old Howard, and caught Mary Goodneighbor on film doing her striptease for the audience. The film led to the closure of the theater, and it remained closed until it caught fire mysteriously in 1961.

The square was also the home of Austin and Stone's Dime Museum.

==== John Winthrop Statue ====
To mark the 250th anniversary of the Commonwealth of Massachusetts, the sculptor Richard Saltonstall Greenough was commissioned to create a bronze sculpture of John Winthrop, the first Governor of the state. The statue was installed in September 1880.

=== Abolitionism ===
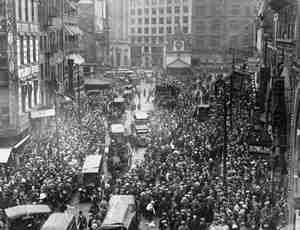
Militia tries to maintain order in Scollay Square during the 1919 Boston Police Strike

Scollay Square was also a flashpoint for the early abolition movement. Author William Lloyd Garrison was twice attacked by an angry mob for printing his anti-slavery newspaper The Liberator, which began publication in 1831. Sarah Parker Remond's first act of civil disobedience occurred in 1853 at the Old Howard when she was refused the seat she had purchased but was instead seated in the 'black' section. Many of the buildings in the area in and around Scollay Square had hidden spaces where escaped slaves were hidden, as part of the Underground Railroad.

=== Destruction and redevelopment ===
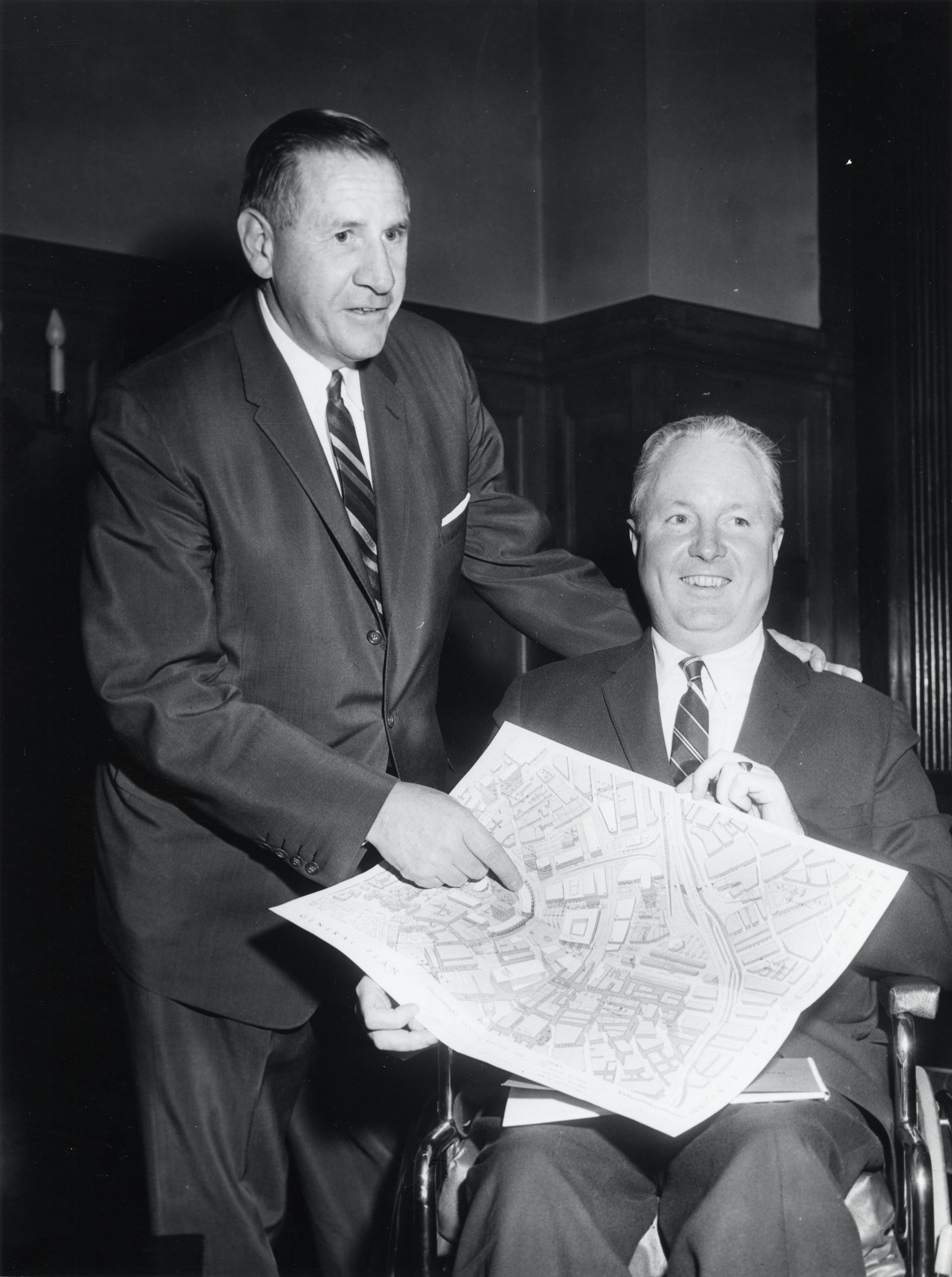
Governor Foster Furcolo and Mayor John F. Collins in the 1960s holding plans to build Government Center in place of Scollay Square

By the end of World War II, Scollay Square had deteriorated into a shanty town and a red-light district. The Old Howard had become an increasingly tawdry burlesque establishment.

As early as the 1950s, city officials had been mulling plans to completely tear down and redevelop the Scollay Square area, in order to remove lower-income residents and troubled businesses from the aging and seedy district. Attempts to reopen the sullied Old Howard by its old performers had been one of the last efforts against redevelopment; but with the theater gutted by fire, a city wrecking ball began the project of demolishing more than 1,000 buildings in the area; 20,000 residents were displaced.

The city offered to give any demolished materials to anyone who could load and take away a full dump truck load. The materials included street paving blocks (Belgian blocks quarried in Quincy), granite, lintels, and bricks.

With $40 million in federal funds, the city built an entirely new development on top of old Scollay Square, renaming the area Government Center, and peppering it with city, state, and federal government buildings: Boston City Hall, City Hall Plaza, Government Service Center, and the Edward W. Brooke Courthouse.

== In popular culture ==
- Pearl Schiff's best-selling 1952 novel, Scollay Square, tells the story of a young woman's affair with a sailor she met in a Scollay Square tavern. The book was considered scandalous at the time.
- Jack Kerouac's 1957 novel, On the Road, tells the story of protagonist Sal Paradise's booze-fueled night at a Scollay Square tavern.
- In the Kingston Trio song "M.T.A.", Charlie's wife regularly goes to the Scollay Square station to hand her stranded husband a sandwich. The scene is mirrored in the Dropkick Murphys song "Skinhead on the MBTA".
- Sam Savage's 2006 novel Firmin, a magical-realist account of a literate rat, takes place in Scollay Square at the time of its destruction.
- The 2015 video game Fallout 4, set in Massachusetts over 200 years after a worldwide nuclear war, features Scollay Square. Part of it is taken up by the post-war settlement Goodneighbor, named after Mary Goodneighbor, who was filmed by local authorities in 1953 doing a striptease at the Old Howard Theatre. Since Fallout takes place in an alternate timeline, it can be assumed that Scollay Square was not altered during the 1960s.
- In The Huntress, a novel by Kate Quinn, several chapters are set in a family home just off of Scollay Square.
- In the TV show Have Gun – Will Travel in the 1958 Season 1 Episode 21 episode titled "The Bostonian", the lead character, Paladin remarks to Henry (a man from Boston that he just met): “in my time Henry, I was the best dressed bouncer in Scollay Square”. The two of them then reminisce about their time in Boston, especially in the Scollay Square and Back Bay areas and reference several bars and establishments in Scollay Square that both had frequented.

== See also ==
- Combat Zone, Boston
- Edward J. Logue, Boston Redevelopment Authority, c. 1962
- William Scollay
