= William Scollay =

American developer and militia officer

Colonel William Scollay (1756–1809) was an American developer and militia officer from Boston during the American Revolution who gave his name to the city's Scollay Square. He was the only surviving son of John Scollay, a strong supporter of colonial rights and a member of Boston's Board of Selectmen in 1764. William was extremely active in the community and was named a Colonel in the Boston Regiment. The Scollays originally came from the Orkney Islands.

Scollay gave his name to the area through his ventures in real estate. In 1795 William Scollay purchased a two-story house on Court Street, locally known as Scollay's Building. The name arose as the stage line's last stop was at the Scollay Building and the conductors would yell "Last stop, Scollay's Building! Everybody off." Eventually the name changed to Scollay's Square and was officially recognised by Boston in 1838. The Scollays ended their association with the square in 1868 when they sold Scollay's Building. Three years later the building was torn down.

William Scollay's sister, Priscilla married Colonel Thomas Melvill, a participant in the Boston Tea Party. Thomas and Priscilla's grandson was author Herman Melville.

== Freemasonry ==
Scollay was the Deputy Grand Master of the Freemasons of Massachusetts in 1795 when a box containing an assemblage of commemorative items was deposited under the corner of the Massachusetts State House on 4 July 1795 by Governor Samuel Adams, assisted by the Grand Master, Paul Revere, and Deputy Grand Master.
