= Austin and Stone's Dime Museum =

Coordinates: 42.3586°N 71.0612°W

Austin and Stone's Dime Museum (ca.1880s-1900s) of Boston, Massachusetts, was an entertainment emporium in Scollay Square (no.4 Tremont Row), established by William Austin and Frank Stone. It featured a freak show as well as dancing girls for entertainment. The freak show and other exhibits such as two-headed animals cost ten cents, while admission to the girlie show cost an additional dime. Performers included William S. Hutchings, the "lightning calculator." Comedian Fred Allen wrote about the Museum in his memoir, Much Ado About Me.

== Images ==
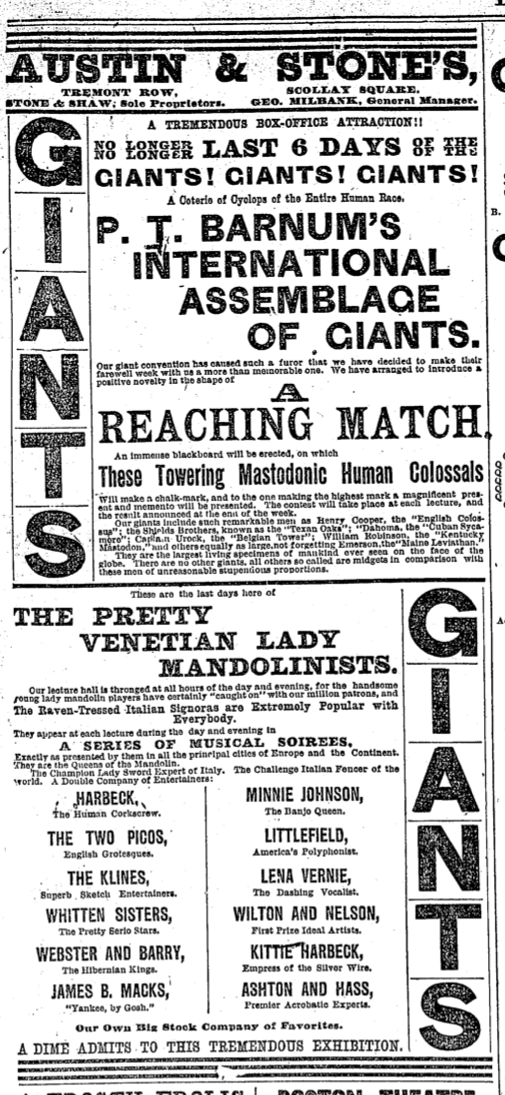
Advertisement, "international assemblage of giants," 1889

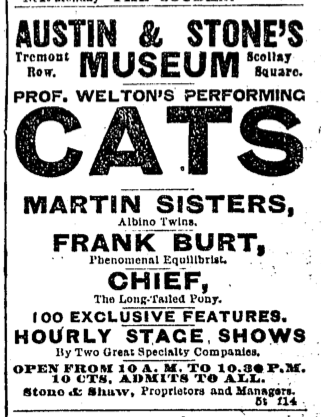
Advertisement, "Prof. Welton's performing cats," 1893

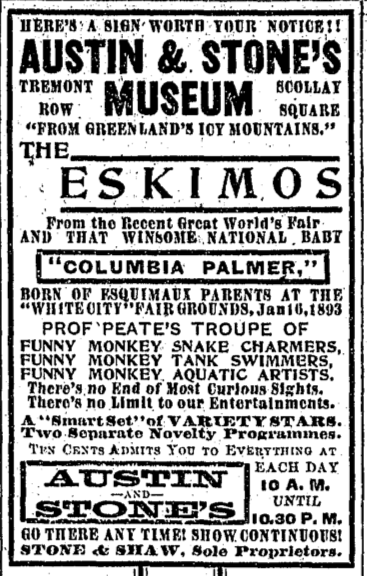
Advertisement, 1894

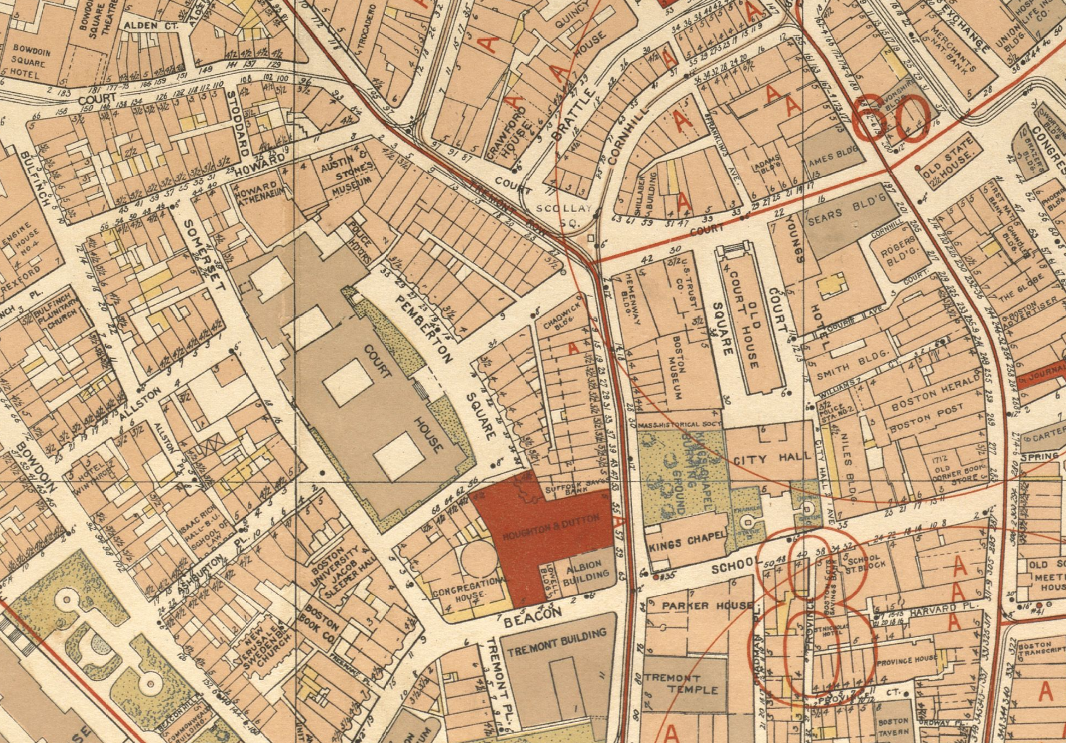
Detail of 1896 map of Boston, showing Austin & Stone's Museum near Howard St.

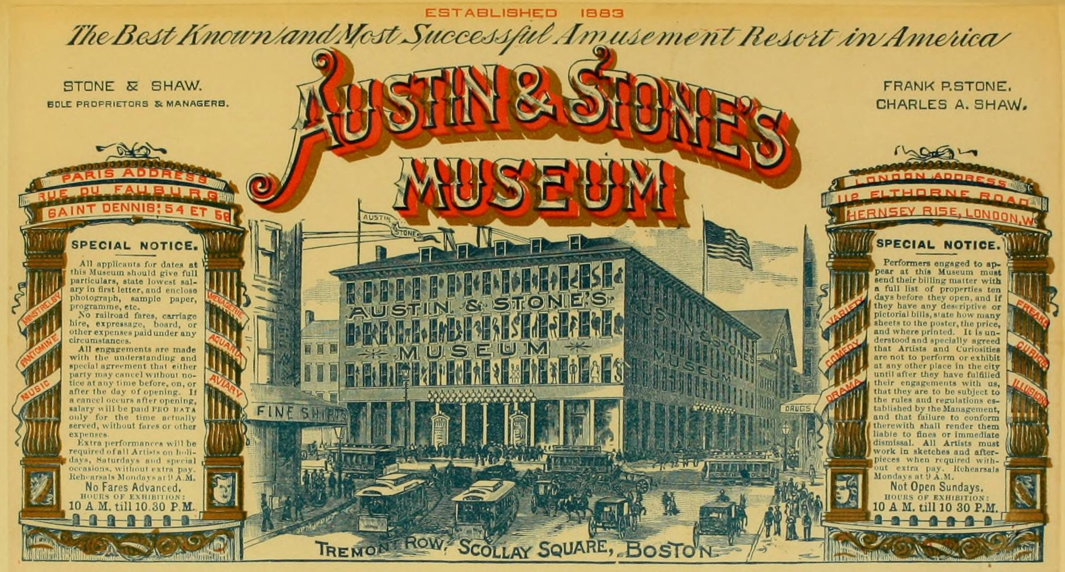
