= Clarcor =

Former American filtration system and packaging manufacturer

CLARCOR Inc.
- Company type: Public
- Industry: Filtration Engines; Membranes Gas Turbines; Valves Hydraulics
- Founded: 1904
- Defunct: 2017
- Fate: Acquired by Parker Hannifin
- Headquarters: Franklin, Tennessee
- Key people: Christopher L. Conway ( Chief Executive Officer and Chairman) David J. Fallon ( Chief Financial Officer, Chief Accounting Officer)(Dec 31, 2013 ) David Lindsay ( Chief Administrative Officer)
- Number of employees: 5,267 ((March 2014))
- Divisions: Engine/Mobil; Industrial/Environmental
- Website: Clarcor Inc.

CLARCOR Inc. was a manufacturer of filtration systems and packaging materials based in Franklin, Tennessee. founded in Rockford, Illinois as JL Clark Manufacturing Co. by John Lewis Clark in 1904. It had approximately 30 manufacturing and distribution sites in the United States.

There were mainly two segments operating in the company: Engine/Mobile Filtration (providing air, fuel, transmission, and hydraulic fluid filters for engines, as well as dust collection cartridges), and Industrial/Environmental Filtration (providing filters for industrial process, pharmaceutical processes).

== Acquisitions and divestitures ==
In 1999, CLARCOR bought the companies Purolator Products Air Filtration Company, Facet International, and Purolator-Facet Filter Products from Mark IV for USD $144.8 million. All three companies were former subsidiaries of Purolator Products and were related to the manufacture and sale of industrial filtration equipment.

In March 2005, the company completed the acquisition of Niagara Screen Products Limited, a manufacturer of woven wire and metallic screening and filtration products.

In November 2005, CLARCOR completed the acquisition of Martin Kurz & Co., Inc. a producer of sintered porous metal laminates used in screening and filtration products, part of CLARCOR's Purolator Advanced Filtration Group.

In December 2007, the company completed the acquisition of Perry Equipment Corporation ("Peco"), a producer of engineered filtration, and merged with CLARCOR’s Facet operations with about $163 million.

In December 2008, CLARCOR completed the acquisition of Keddeg Company, a producer of aviation filtration, part of CLARCOR's Purolator Advanced Filtration Group.

In January 2011, the company completed the acquisition of TransWeb, LLC, a filtration media supplier.

In May 2012, CLARCOR completed the acquisition of Modular Engineering Pty Ltd., part of CLARCOR's PECOFacet division, for its famous natural gas filtration products.

In December 2013, the company acquired the Bekaert Advanced Filtration business from NV Bekaert SA.
Also in December, the company completed the acquisition of the Air Filtration business of General Electric Company's Power & Water division, adding BHA and ALTAIR air filtration products.

In June 2015, CLARCOR announced the sale of its packaging subsidiary, J.L. Clark, to Chicago-based CC Industries, Inc.

In December 2016, Parker Hannifin entered into a definitive agreement to acquire CLARCOR for approximately $4.3 billion in cash. The acquisition was completed on February 28, 2017.

== Products and services ==
Engine/Mobile Filtration provides filtration products for engines used in stationary power generation and mobile, industrial, and agricultural equipment, such as air, fuel, hydraulic fluid filters.
Industrial/Environmental Filtration provides filtration products used in industrial and commercial processes, and infrastructures, such as air cleaners and antimicrobial treated filters.
