= Nathan Silver (disambiguation) =

Nathan Silver or Nate Silver may refer to:

- Nathan Silver, American independent filmmaker
- Nathan Silver (1936–2025), British-American architect and architecture critic
- Nate Silver (born 1978), American statistician, political analyst, author, sports gambler and poker player
- Nate Silver, American football player
