= Boston City Hall =

City hall of Boston, Massachusetts

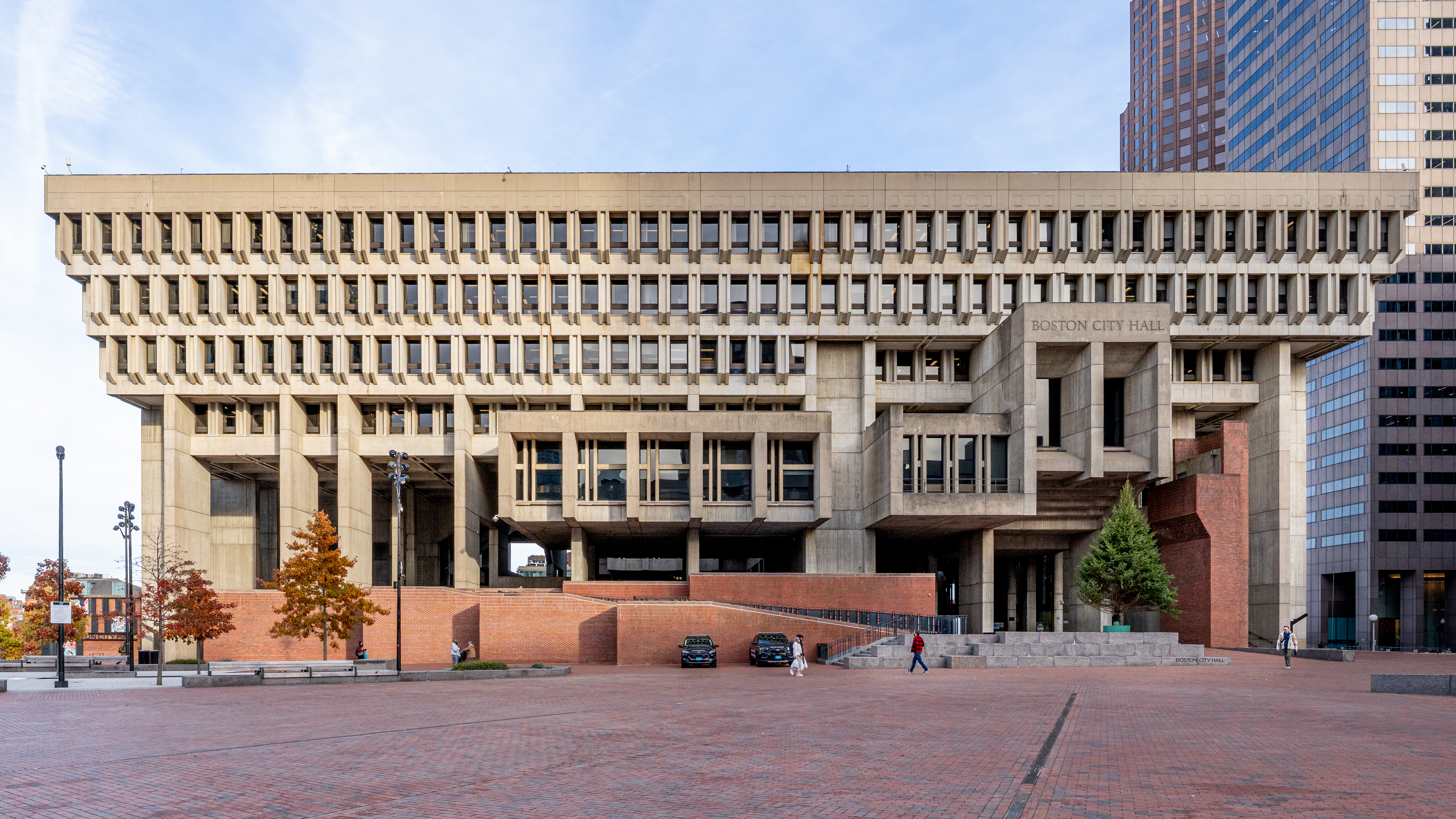
- The building in 2025
- Alternative names: City Hall

General information
- Type: City hall
- Architectural style: Brutalist
- Location: 1 City Hall Square; Boston, Massachusetts, US
- Coordinates: 42°21′37″N 71°03′29″W
- Groundbreaking: September 18, 1963; 63 years ago
- Completed: 1969; 57 years ago
- Opened: December 18, 1967; 58 years ago
- Inaugurated: February 11, 1969; 57 years ago
- Renovated: 1981–1984, 2018, 2020s
- Cost: $26.5 million (1969) (Note: Equivalent to $178.2 million in 2025)
- Owner: Government of Boston
- Landlord: Government of Boston

Technical details
- Structural system: Concrete superstructure
- Material: Brick and concrete
- Size: Ground dimensions: 322 by 250 feet (98 by 76 m)
- Floor count: 9
- Floor area: 513,000 square feet (47,700 m^{2})

Design and construction
- Architecture firm: Kallmann McKinnell & Knowles (primary architect); Campbell, Aldrich & Nulty (associate architects)
- Structural engineer: LeMessurier Consultants
- Other designers: ISD Inc. (most interiors); Ann Sullivan and Tom Rowlands (interior of mayor's suite)
- Main contractor: J. W. Bateson Company
- Awards: American Institute of Architects Honor Award (1969); Boston Society of Architects Parker Medal (1969)
- Designations: Boston Landmark (2025)

Renovating team
- Architects: Utile and Reed Hilderbrand Landscape Architects (2018)

Other information
- Public transit: Blue Line Green Line at Government Center

Website
- Official website

Boston Landmark
- Designated: December 10, 2024

Boston City Hall is the seat of city government of Boston, Massachusetts, United States. Surrounded by City Hall Plaza in the Government Center section of Downtown Boston, it includes the offices of the Mayor and the City Council. The building was designed by the architecture firms Kallmann McKinnell & Knowles (KMK) and Campbell, Aldrich & Nulty, with LeMessurier Consultants as engineers. A major brutalist-style building, City Hall is a designated Boston Landmark.

City Hall was proposed in 1956 as part of the Government Center development, following decades of efforts to replace Old City Hall. Acquiring the land and sufficient funding took half a decade, and KMK won a two-phase architectural design competition in 1962. Groundbreaking took place on September 18, 1963; the first occupants moved in during late 1967, and the building was decorated on February 11, 1969. In addition to governmental business, City Hall was used for a variety of events and exhibits. Over time, the building suffered from deferred maintenance, and Mayor Thomas Menino twice proposed replacing it in the 1990s and 2000s. City Hall underwent renovations starting in the 2010s.

The nine-story massing is split into three tiers, corresponding to the interior subdivisions. There are public areas on the first through fourth stories, elected officials' spaces on the fifth story, and nonpublic agencies at the sixth through ninth stories. The facade is made of brick below and concrete above, with entrances on the bottom three levels. There are protruding "hoods" around the fifth-floor windows, while the upper stories protrude outward, surrounding a central fourth-story courtyard. Inside are a concourse on the second story; a plaza lobby occupying the third and fourth stories; a council chamber, mayor's suite, and councilors' rooms on the fifth story; and offices elsewhere.

The building has received extensive commentary on its symbolism, usability, and architecture. Architects initially had mixed views of the design but praised the building after its completion. City Hall received the American Institute of Architects' 1969 Honor Award and was ranked in a 1976 poll of the United States' greatest buildings. Conversely, the public widely condemned it, and City Hall has appeared in several lists of the world's ugliest buildings. The design has influenced Brutalist architecture in Boston, along with similar buildings across the U.S. and worldwide.

== Site ==
Boston City Hall occupies a parallelogram land lot in Downtown Boston, Massachusetts, United States. The eastern edge of City Hall abuts Congress Street and overlooks Faneuil Hall and Quincy Market. The current City Hall was developed as part of Government Center, an urban renewal project in the 1950s, which also includes the Boston Government Service Center, Center Plaza, and the Kennedy Federal Building.

City Hall sits at the edge of City Hall Plaza, which spans 8 acres (3.2 ha) and is surrounded by the other buildings of Government Square. Shaped like a curving trapezoid, the plaza slopes down toward the east and has brick paving. Several tiers of brick terraces radiate from City Hall through the plaza. At City Hall's southern boundary, a set of stairs from Congress Street ascends west to plaza level. City Hall Plaza has an entrance to the Government Center station, served by the MBTA subway's Blue and Green lines.

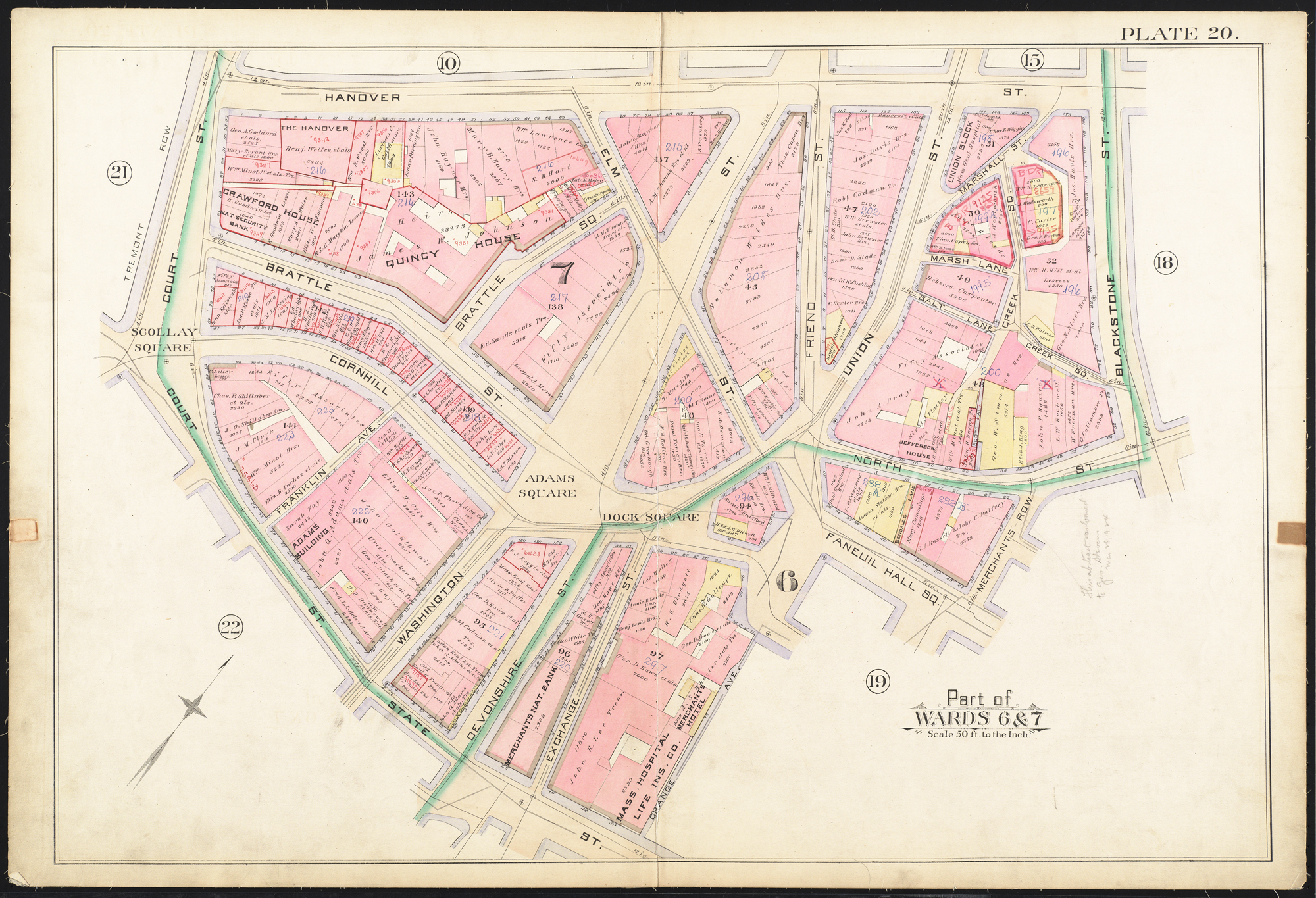
Map of the area c. 1888. The modern City Hall is located approximately on the site of Adams Square.

The Government Center complex replaced over 50 acres (20 ha) in Scollay Square. Prior to redevelopment Scollay Square had contained the Old Howard Theatre and brick buildings dating from as early as the American colonial period. The site of City Hall was occupied by Adams Square. By the 1950s, the city wished to redevelop Scollay Square, which had become rundown. The newly-completed, elevated Fitzgerald Expressway disconnected Scollay Square from the nearby waterfront, exacerbating its decay.

== Development ==
Boston's earliest seat of government had been the First Town-House. The government then occupied the Old State House (twice), (Note: The Old State House served as town hall in 1711–1743 and again as city hall in 1830–1841.) Faneuil Hall, the Mechanics Building, and the Old Suffolk County Courthouse on School Street. City Hall's immediate predecessor had been Old City Hall, a Second Empire style building completed in 1865, which replaced the County Courthouse. It was overcrowded as early as 1890, and all governmental offices except those of the Mayor and City Council were moved to an annex in 1912. By the mid-20th century, Old City Hall was functionally inadequate and costly to maintain. A new city hall was first proposed in 1907, and there were attempts to relocate the city's seat of government starting in the 1930s.

City Hall was developed amid Boston's economic and demographic stagnation in the 1950s. After winning the 1949 Boston mayoral election, John Hynes devised plans to redevelop Scollay Square. As part of the Government Center project, Hynes suggested replacing Scollay Square with city, state, and federal government buildings. He announced plans for the new City Hall at Government Center in 1956. Public reaction to the redevelopment was mixed.

=== Planning, site selection, and approvals ===
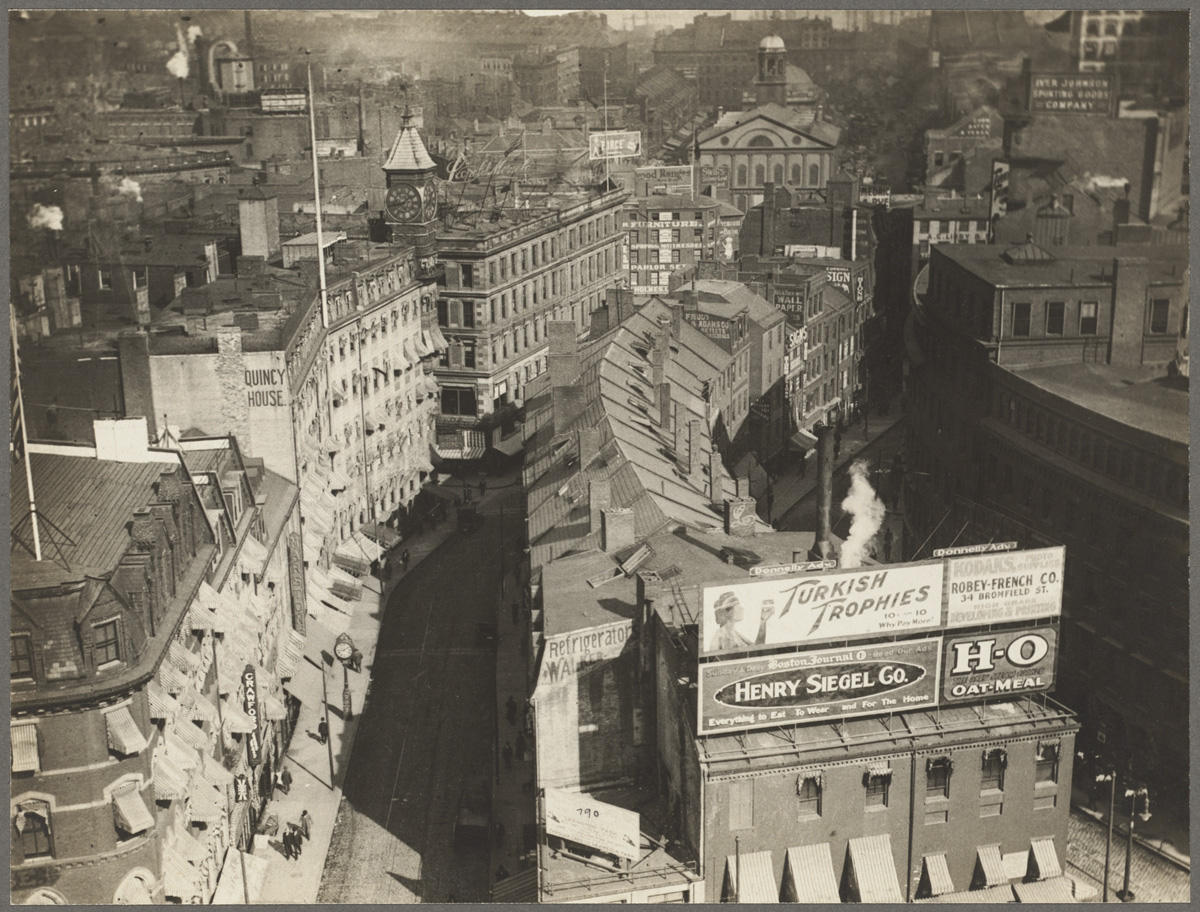
The future site of City Hall, showing Brattle Street, Cornhill, and a small portion of Faneuil Hall in the background, c. 1920

The city requested in early 1957 that the Massachusetts House of Representatives approve a request to acquire land and borrow money for the new City Hall and an adjacent federal building. The House raised no objection to the request, but the proposed legislation was re-filed later that year after the House failed to vote on it. By later that year, the new City Hall was intended to be built just north of Faneuil Hall, along North Street. In January 1958, the federal government agreed to become involved in Government Center, as long as the complex included state and city government buildings and involved the city's full participation. After a Massachusetts House committee approved the city's request for the new City Hall, Governor Foster Furcolo signed legislation in October 1958 authorizing the building's construction. Hynes formed the Government Center Commission (GCC) the next month to oversee the project. Architects (Note: One source from 2012 specifically cites architect James Lawrence as having originated the idea for a competition.) advocated for the GCC to host a design competition for the building, rather than preselecting an architect as the city usually did. At that point, the structure was slated to cost $20 million. (Note: Equivalent to $171 million in 2025) The City Council allowed city officials to apply for a construction loan that December, and the city government proposed a bond issue to raise $15 million. (Note: Equivalent to $128 million in 2025)

Government Center's site plan had been finalized by early 1959, except for the new City Hall and the proposed federal building. City Hall was tentatively assigned a site east of Scollay Square, between Cornhill and Hanover Street. Delays arose when General Services Administration (GSA) administrator Franklin G. Floete expressed interest in a site in the Back Bay and the City Hall site itself. That April, Becker and Becker Associates were hired to conduct a planning study for City Hall, which was completed that year. Furcolo authorized the acquisition of equipment and furnishings for the building that July. The federal building and City Hall sites were finalized by October, and Hynes directed the Boston Redevelopment Authority (BRA) to begin acquiring 140,000 square feet (13,000 m^{2}) for City Hall in December. Redevelopment continued after John F. Collins became mayor in 1960 and appointed Edward J. Logue to lead the BRA. The development was delayed due to uncertainty over where—or even whether—the federal building would be built, as the federal government had agreed to fund a substantial portion of the cost. The new City Hall's construction also could not begin without state approval of a $50 million bond issue, (Note: Equivalent to $416 million in 2025) which would fund half of Government Center's $100 million cost. (Note: Equivalent to $833 million in 2025) The Massachusetts Senate approved the bond issue in September 1960, after the Massachusetts House approved it on their second try.

Logue moved to begin acquiring land in 1961, through the "early land acquisition program", which allowed some work to begin before the city approved the overall Government Center plan. He also sought an architecturally prominent design for City Hall. At Logue's recommendation, the city hired I. M. Pei to design the master plan. Pei's proposal entailed replacing most of the site with a series of governmental buildings around the new City Hall. Pei placed the new City Hall building near the lot's southern end, to encourage other new buildings there, and he specified that the building have a low roof to match Faneuil Hall's low-rise massing. Casabella Continuita wrote that the eastern and southern elevations of City Hall's facade would also "provide an effective visual backdrop" to Dock Square and Washington Street, respectively. Pei's plan dictated the size of the building's footprint but left other design elements to the building's architect. The Boston City Council authorized the BRA to request a federal loan in June 1961, and Pei's final site plan was approved that month. The federal government approved a $21 million loan that September, allowing land acquisition to begin. (Note: Equivalent to $175 million in 2025)

=== Design and land acquisition ===
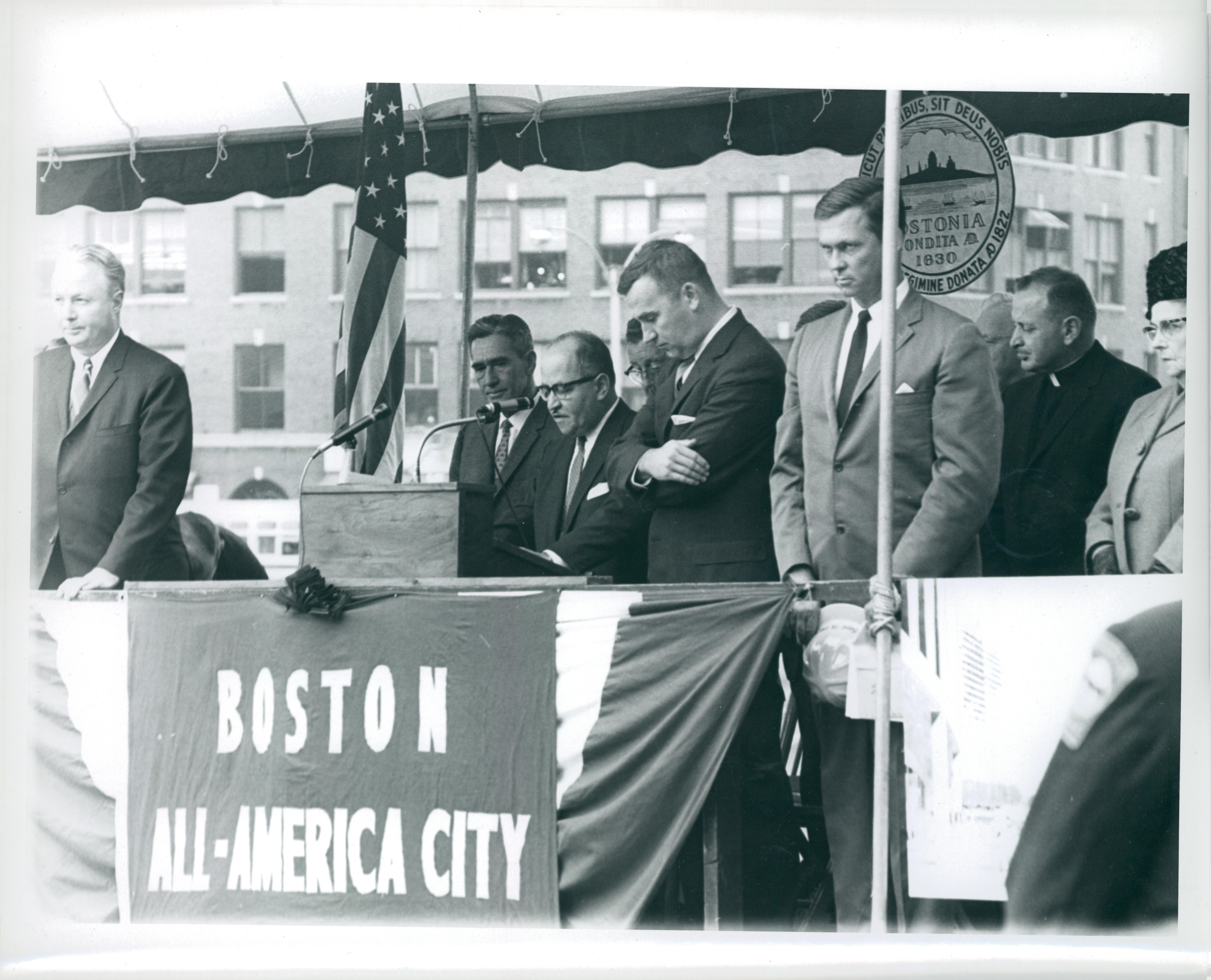
Governor Chub Peabody and Mayor John F. Collins at the building's groundbreaking

The GCC was planning a design competition by November 1960, and Mayor John F. Collins announced the following April that he would allocate $75,000 for a nationwide contest. (Note: Equivalent to $618,000 in 2025) This was described as the first municipal building competition since 1909. The competition was delayed, pending approval of the funding. In October 1961, the city began soliciting proposals for the first of the competition's two phases. The first stage's plans were reviewed by a jury composed of architects Pietro Belluschi, Ralph Rapson, Walter Netsch, and William Wurster, along with businessman Harold D. Hodgkinson. The competition's first phase had a deadline of January 17, 1962, upon which the jury was to choose eight finalist proposals. Over 1,500 architects and firms from across the US expressed interest. The jury received 256 entries for the first phase, and entries continued to be delivered after the deadline. The finalists were selected January 28, with each receiving $5,000 to develop a final plan. (Note: Equivalent to $41,000 in 2025) (Note: The finalists were: Joseph T. Schiffer; F. Frederick Bruck and Ervin Y. Galantay; Waterman, Page & Associates; James B. Zwack, Wilbert O. Ruster, and Lloyd Gadau; Mitchell/Giurgola; Kallmann McKinnell & Knowles; Y. C. Wong, T. C. Chang, Gertrude Kerbis, Otto Stark, and S. Chan Sit; George Rafferty) The winner was to receive a $10,000 payment toward their design contract. (Note: Equivalent to $81,000 in 2025)

The businessmen Sidney R. Rabb and O. Kelley Anderson joined the jury for the second round. Many of the finalist designs incorporated architectural details that the jury described as domineering, brutal, or aggressive. The winning contestants had to be affiliated with someone licensed to practice architecture in Massachusetts, or hold a license themselves. Kallmann McKinnell & Knowles (KMK) of New York submitted the winning design, in conjunction with Massachusetts-based Campbell & Aldrich and structural engineering firm LeMessurier Associates. The winners' plans were announced on May 3. Their plans called for a triple-tiered design with public functions at the base; elected officials' spaces on the intermediate levels; and administrative offices on the upper levels. Spanning nine stories, the building was to be made of brick below and concrete above. It was to be strong enough to support the weight of three more stories if necessary. The architects said their design was intended to create a pedestrian-friendly "people's building". The jury had regarded the design as being powerful while simultaneously deferential to nearby sites such as Faneuil Hall, Quincy Market, and Dock Square.

The GCC approved the plan in June, recommending that KMK receive a $800,000 contract. (Note: Equivalent to $7 million in 2025) The approval stipulated that the commission buy the site and that the architects complete preliminary drawings by December; the GCC ultimately agreed to pay $1.75 million for the land. (Note: Equivalent to $14 million in 2025) In the meantime, the architects revised their plans, adding protruding concrete "hoods" around the fifth floor's windows and double concrete "fins" between the windows above. The architects signed a contract with the city government in October 1962. Two of KMK's principal architects, Gerhard Kallmann and Michael McKinnell, moved to Boston to oversee the project, staying there permanently. Becker & Becker also devised plans for the interior furnishings and arrangements during 1963. The final plan for Government Center was unveiled that April.

=== Construction ===
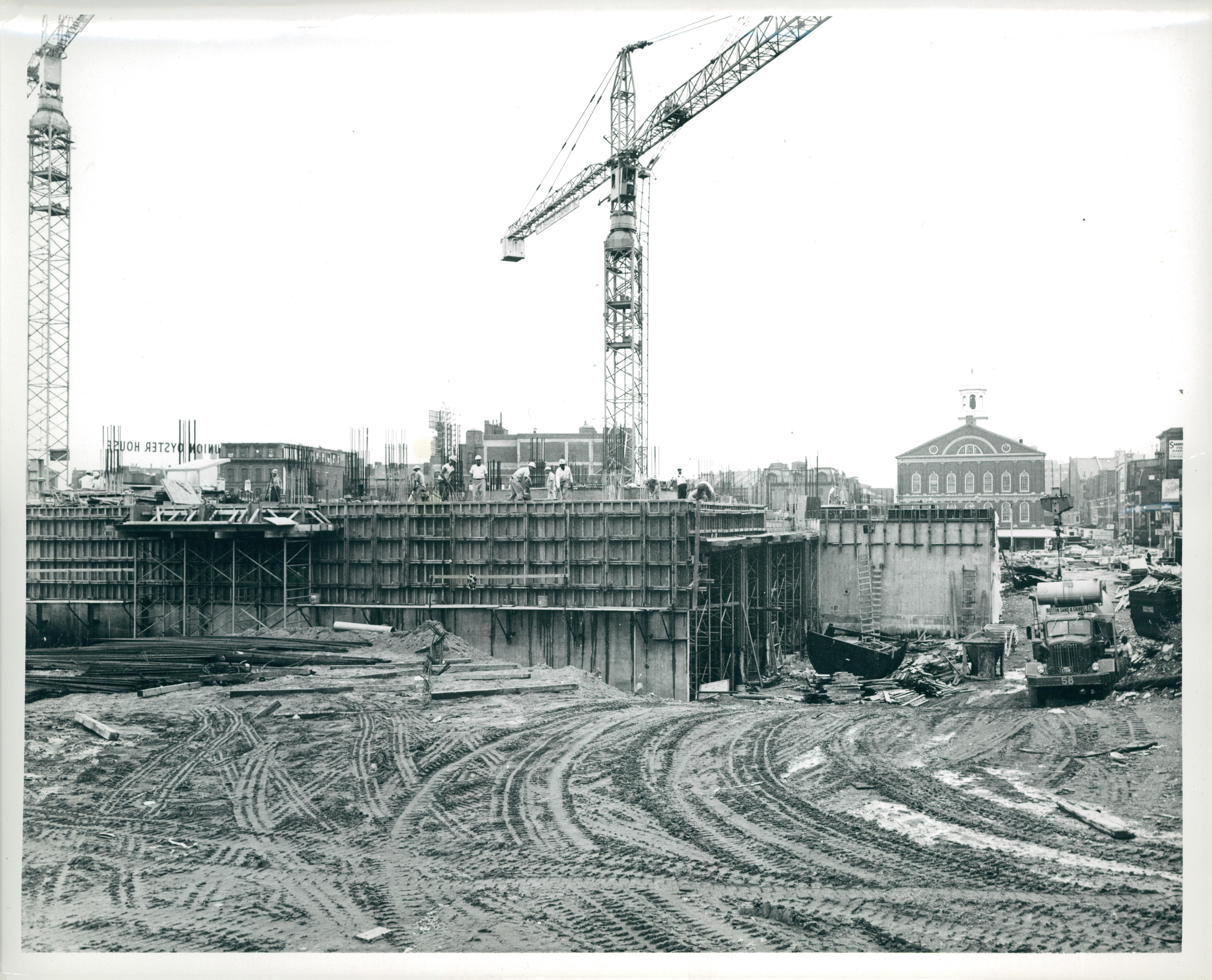
City Hall construction, c. 1960s

The city originally wanted to begin construction in August 1963, but the City Council had failed to approve the plan by then. Due to federal restrictions, the lack of approval would have typically delayed City Hall's construction, but Collins requested that federal officials override these restrictions and transfer ownership of the City Hall site to the BRA. Federal officials approved the land transfer in mid-August. The city took title to the land and awarded a $900,000 contract for initial work to the Wes-Julian Construction Company in early September 1963, (Note: Equivalent to $7 million in 2025) and a groundbreaking ceremony took place on September 18. Work on the foundation was well underway by the end of that year, even as the Government Center plan was still awaiting approval. Foundation contractors drove deep pilings into the soil, which took one year to complete. The overall plan was not approved until mid-1964, and the foundation was completed that July.

The building's construction created embedded emissions equivalent to 6.5 to 7 million US gallons (25,000,000 to 26,000,000 L; 5,400,000 to 5,800,000 imp gal) of gasoline. The city solicited bids for City Hall's construction contract in May 1964, but all the bids were higher than expected. The city asked the state to increase the $20 million budget, (Note: Equivalent to $158 million in 2025) since $3 million had already been spent. (Note: Equivalent to $24 million in 2025) The next month, after state legislators allowed the city to borrow another $5 million, (Note: Equivalent to $40 million in 2025) city officials awarded a $19.9 million contract to the J. W. Bateson Company. (Note: Equivalent to $158 million in 2025) The concrete work, half of which was precast, alone accounted for approximately 35% of the construction cost. By the time the BRA approved plans for City Hall's plaza in May 1965, two cranes were constructing City Hall's above-ground superstructure. The new City Hall was half-completed by mid-1966. Although the project was originally supposed to be completed that September, this deadline was not met. To pay for equipment, Collins requested in mid-1967 that state legislators increase the budget by $1 million, (Note: Equivalent to $7 million in 2025) at which point $24.5 million had been spent. (Note: Equivalent to $180 million in 2025) Work on the plaza began that August.

Collins, whose term expired at the end of 1967, wanted to be the first mayor to use the new City Hall, even though interior furnishing and equipment installation (including central heating) had not yet been completed. Collins moved in on December 18, 1967. He caught pneumonia shortly afterward and was not using the office when his successor Kevin White was inaugurated. City Hall's official opening, rescheduled for 1968, was repeatedly delayed while construction costs increased by another $125,000. (Note: Equivalent to $0.9 million in 2025) Among the factors delaying the building's opening were an 18-week telephone workers' strike, which delayed the installation of telephones; City Council president William J. Foley Jr. also claimed that broken-down elevators were preventing workers from hauling up materials. By September 1968, the building was 90% finished, and final touches were being added. City housing inspectors moved in that November, becoming the first non-mayoral offices to occupy the building. The City Council first convened at City Hall on January 13, 1969, and office workers began moving in that month. Shortly after moving in, city councillors began an inquiry into the $1.3 million furniture cost, (Note: Equivalent to $8.7 million in 2025) finding that excessive restrictions on bidding procedures had inflated the cost.

== Operational history ==
=== 20th century ===
==== Early years ====
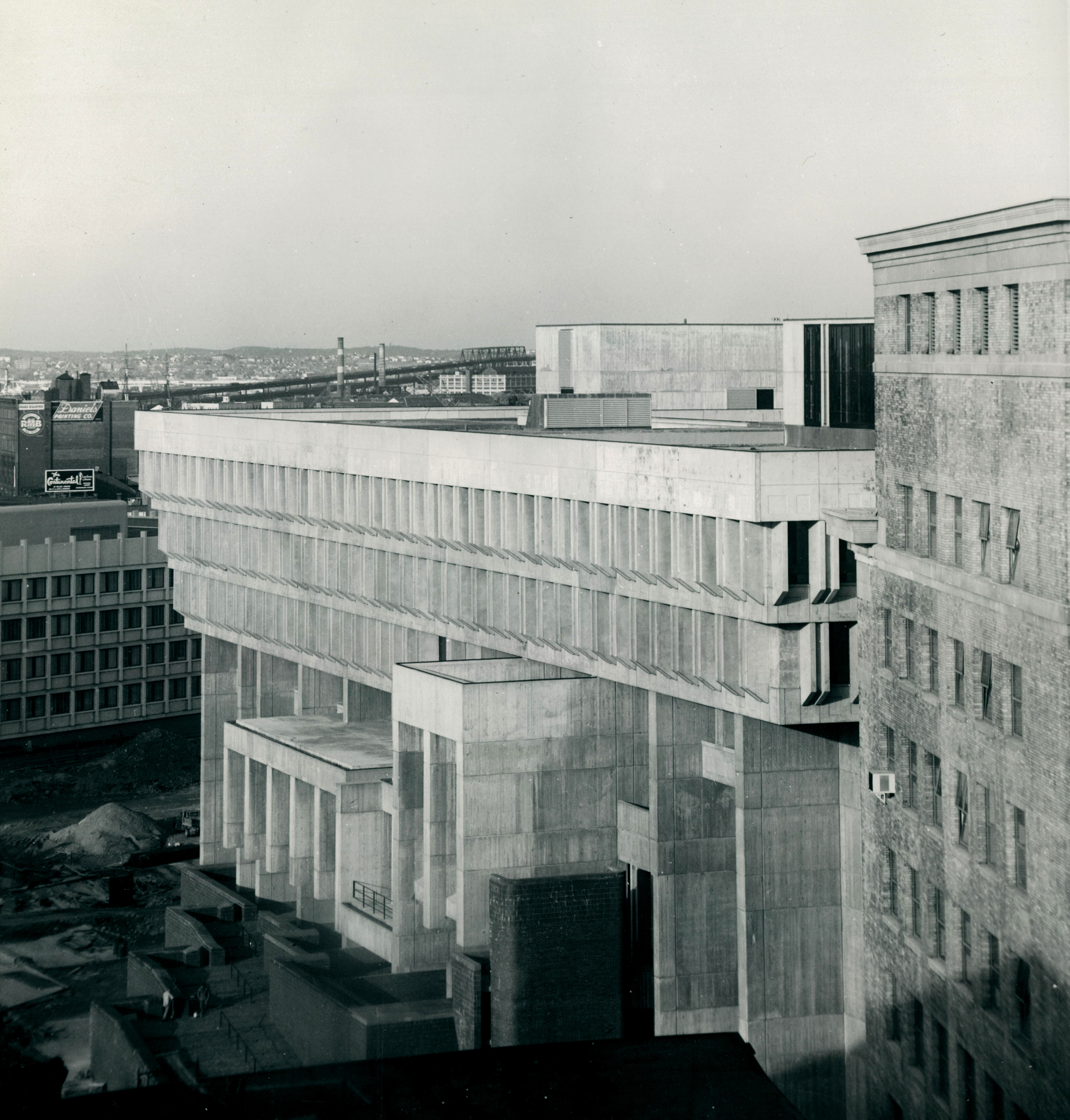
Boston City Hall, c. 1968

The building's dedication ceremony occurred on February 11, 1969, having been delayed one day by a snowstorm. The dedication was followed by a weeklong celebration. In total, the building had cost $26.5 million and the land another $1.8 million. (Note: Equivalent to $12.1 million in 2025) Robert Campbell of the Boston Globe called it the "pride of the renewal surge" led by Logue under Collins's administration. The historian Brian Sirman wrote that the building's completion precipitated "a new era of inclusion in city government", including the election of the first female and black City Council presidents and the first Hispanic councillor. By mid-1969, the building saw up to a hundred visitors per hour. Workers inscribed the building's name into the facade that November, marking the completion of exterior work, and City Hall hosted its first major party that month.

The plaza lobby was originally used for such events as press conferences, theatrical performances, exhibits, and concerts. Boston's chief legal counsel, Herbert P. Gleason, recalled that "very distinguished guests" including Queen Elizabeth II wanted to visit the building and host events there. One employee recalled that the new City Hall's design prompted coworkers to dress up, something they rarely did at the Old City Hall. Mayor White, who initially found it difficult to adjust to the new building, later said he "wouldn't want to change a thing" about the mayoral suite. Conversely, City Council members disliked their new accommodations, which were incomplete when they moved in. The building lacked a cafeteria, despite city employees' near-unanimous support for one during the planning process. It was also cold and leaky, and the doors sometimes locked people in; workers complained about uncomfortable furniture, broken clocks, and slow elevators. The layout, with its multilevel entrances and elevator configuration, created confusion from the outset. The city government exacted disproportionate control over the interior environment, such that employees were forbidden to adjust thermostats, move furniture, or hang decor on walls.

An information center had been added to the lobby by 1970, but visitors still frequently reported being confused. A proposed footbridge from City Hall's plaza to Dock Square was narrowed, then canceled altogether, due to a lack of funding. Complaints about maintenance began to emerge in the early 1970s, and visitors continued to complain about slow elevators and confusing layout. By that decade, City Hall was frequently used as a showcase for art exhibitions, which were open to the public 24 hours a day. The fifth floor had a 3,000-square-foot (280 m^{2}) art gallery, the first in an American city hall, and the building and plaza hosted events such as concerts, celebrations, and demonstrations. A playground on one of the balconies burned down in 1977. The council chamber was originally rented out for events sponsored by councillors, but in 1979, City Council President Joseph M. Tierney proposed banning all non-council events.

==== 1980s and 1990s ====
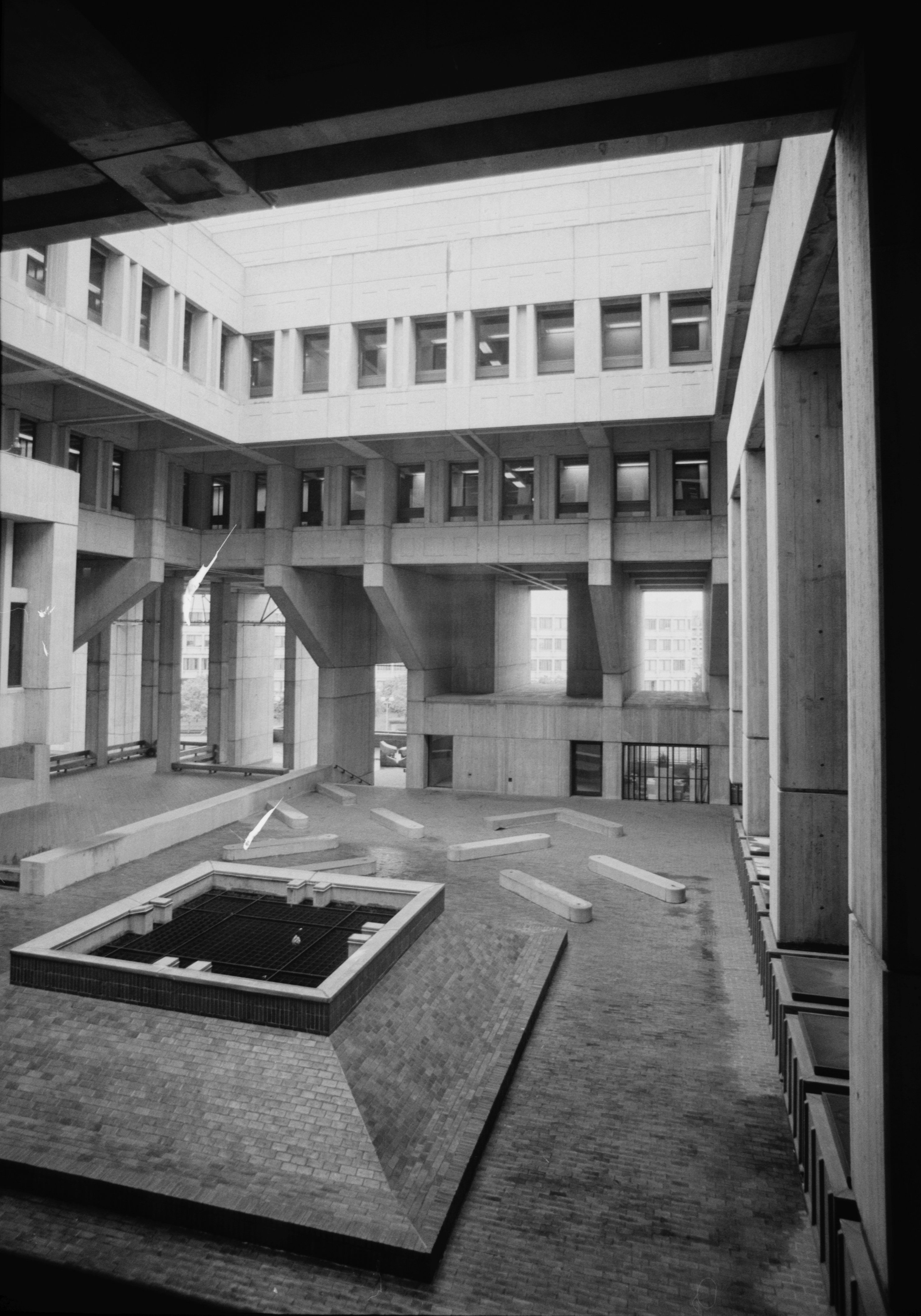
The skylight in the central courtyard, seen in 1981

As the years progressed, the interiors were subdivided, and the building's aging infrastructure and lack of energy efficiency elicited criticism. In 1980, White's administration announced plans for a $750,000 renovation of the top five floors. (Note: Equivalent to $2.5 million in 2025) White also proposed converting the deputy mayor's office into a dining room, but the City Council opposed the plan. Boston voters approved a measure in 1981 to expand the City Council from 9 to 13 members, necessitating the addition of four offices at City Hall. Though the four new councillors' positions were to be created in 1983, these offices were delayed due to disputes between the mayor's office and City Council. Ultimately, the new offices were built within the City Council library, and the art gallery was moved to plaza level. Mayor White's successor, Raymond Flynn, in 1984 disbanded several governmental agencies that had been headquartered at City Hall, freeing up space for three other departments to move there.

By 1988, City Hall needed $1.2 million for repairs. (Note: Equivalent to $2.8 million in 2025) City councillor David Scondras proposed selling the structure and constructing a municipal office building nearby. Scondras invited KMK to plan several modifications, telling the Boston Globe that the layout "does not work" for visitors and was missing amenities such as a cafeteria. At the time, the building had maintenance and cleanliness issues, including leaks and poor temperature control, and was difficult to navigate. Only 60% of City Hall's space was usable as offices, yet many municipal agencies had moved elsewhere due to overcrowding. An estimated 1,200 of the city's 3,200 employees were working in rented space, which cost the city $3.2 million annually. (Note: Equivalent to $7.5 million in 2025) Mayor Flynn announced plans in 1990 to replace the slow elevators. Utility expenses had reached $5,000 per day by the following year, (Note: Equivalent to $11,000 in 2025) prompting the city government to turn furnaces off during off-peak hours to save money. A transformer explosion in 1995 injured dozens, caused smoke damage, and temporarily closed the building.

The private sector had expressed interest in proposals to refurbish City Hall by the 1990s. Proposals included closing off the mayor's private elevator and consolidating entrances to reduce visitor confusion. A desk used by former mayor James Michael Curley, which had been removed from City Hall in the 1970s, was reinstalled in the Eagle Room in 1996. That year, Flynn's successor Thomas Menino proposed acquiring the Post Office Square federal courthouse and relocating the city government there, which was not carried out. In 1998, Menino allocated $250,000 (Note: Equivalent to $473,000 in 2025) to study relocating the city government and either demolishing or adaptively reusing the existing City Hall. Menino estimated that a new city hall would cost $15–20 million, (Note: Equivalent to $27.6–36.8 million in 2025) but observers criticized the study as financially wasteful. By the following year, Menino's administration planned to keep elected officials' offices and major departments at City Hall, relocating smaller agencies elsewhere. Architect Henry MacLean proposed a rooftop restaurant and, in conjunction with Franziska Amacher, a glass roof above the courtyard. These were not carried out.

=== 21st century ===
==== 2000s and early 2010s plans ====
The city installed an internet exchange point under City Hall in 2000–2001. Peggy Davis-Mullen, a councillor who had previously opposed Menino's efforts to sell City Hall and the plaza, proposed such a sale in her unsuccessful 2001 mayoral campaign. Several workers also claimed they were suffering from sick building syndrome, but consultants failed to find persistent air-quality issues. Following the September 11 attacks, city officials increased security and instituted security screenings at City Hall, and visitors were no longer allowed to use the northern entrance to the second story. The city government hired Schwartz/Silver Architects to redesign the entrances and plaza lobby in 2005, but nothing came of this plan.

Menino again suggested selling the property in December 2006 and moving the seat of city government to South Boston. Government officials created a wishlist of design features for the new building at Menino's direction, and developers expressed interest in the City Hall site. An advocacy group called Citizens for City Hall was formed in opposition to Menino's plan. Opponents said the new site would be a major inconvenience, and they also claimed the existing building's issues were easily fixable and that a new city hall would be out of place in South Boston. The City Council also opposed the plan, introducing a competing proposal in mid-2007 to study renovating the existing building. In December 2008, Menino suspended proposals for a new city hall, citing the Great Recession. An advocacy group, Friends of Boston City Hall, was established to develop support for preserving City Hall and its plaza.

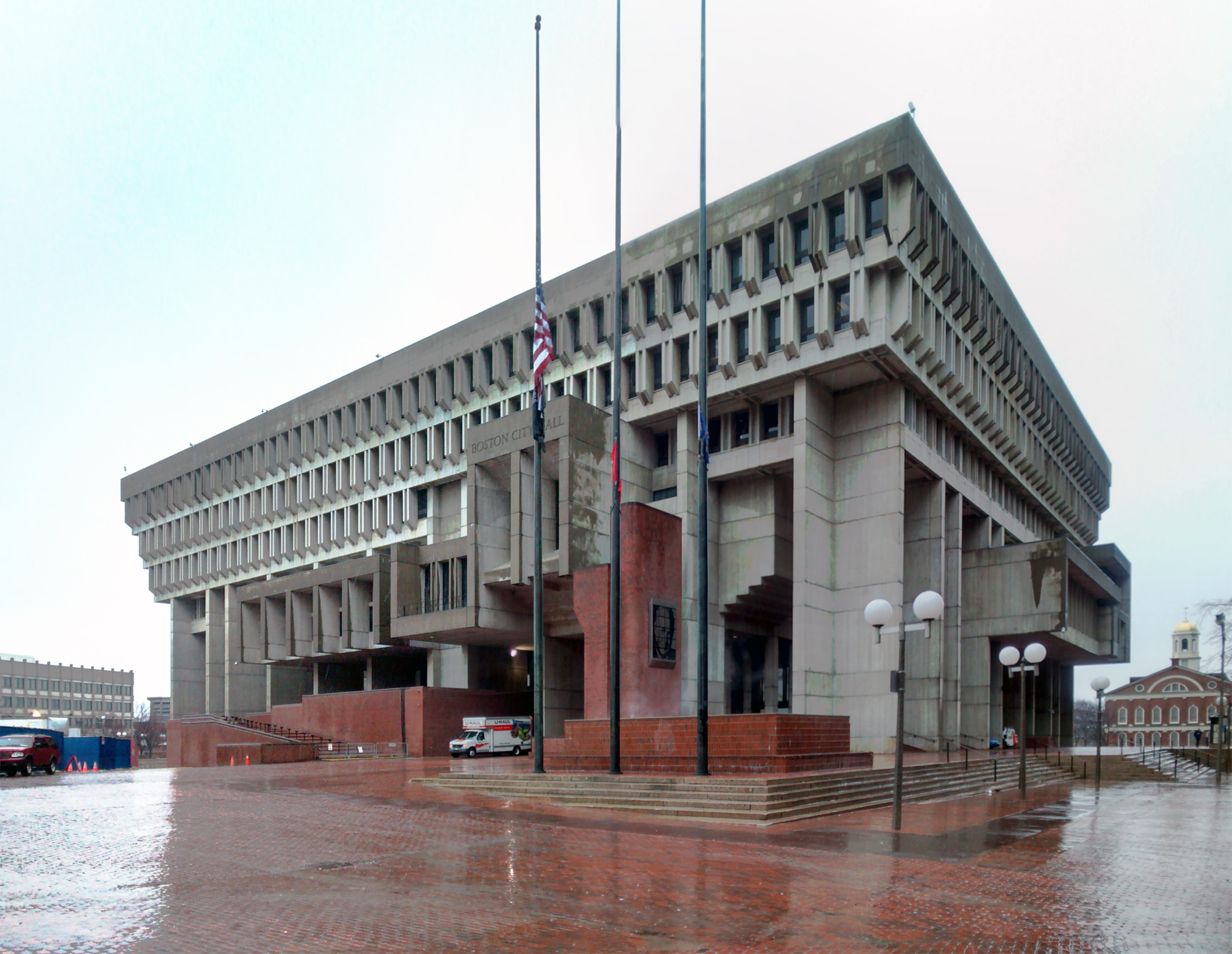
The western facade in 2014, seen from the southwest corner

The Boston Society of Architects held a competition for ideas to modify City Hall in 2010, and plans to renovate the plaza were announced the next year. As a candidate in the 2013 Boston mayoral election, Marty Walsh called for City Hall to be sold for redevelopment, but after he won the election, Walsh did not pursue such a sale. In 2015, the Boston government launched a "Rethink City Hall" program to gather ideas for changes to the building and plaza. Local developer Joseph Fallon donated funds for a kitchen renovation that year. Walsh announced plans in January 2016 to install new LED lighting outside the building, which was activated that October. The Eagle Room furniture was overhauled that year.

==== Late 2010s to present ====
The Getty Foundation awarded the Boston government a $120,000 grant in 2017 to study the building and propose a strategy for renovations. By then, it was estimated that the building would need $91 million in repairs over 25 years. Architecture firms Utile and Reed Hilderbrand Landscape Architects were hired to lead renovations. As part of a 2018 renovation, Utile designed new lighting and signage and reconfigured the plaza lobby. The building's cooling system was also renovated, and there were also plans to rebuild the northern entrance. The city government celebrated City Hall's 50th anniversary in 2019, at which point it was preparing to renovate the building and plaza. The city announced a $60 million renovation of the plaza in 2018, which was ultimately completed in 2022. The plaza renovation entailed reopening the northern entrance.

A management plan based on the 2017 Getty grant was published in 2021. Under Mayor Michelle Wu, the city government allocated $80 million for City Hall in its capital plan in 2023. These funds were used for additional upgrades including new windows, LED illumination, and replacement of the heating and hot-water systems. A cafe opened in the plaza lobby in 2025.

== Architecture ==
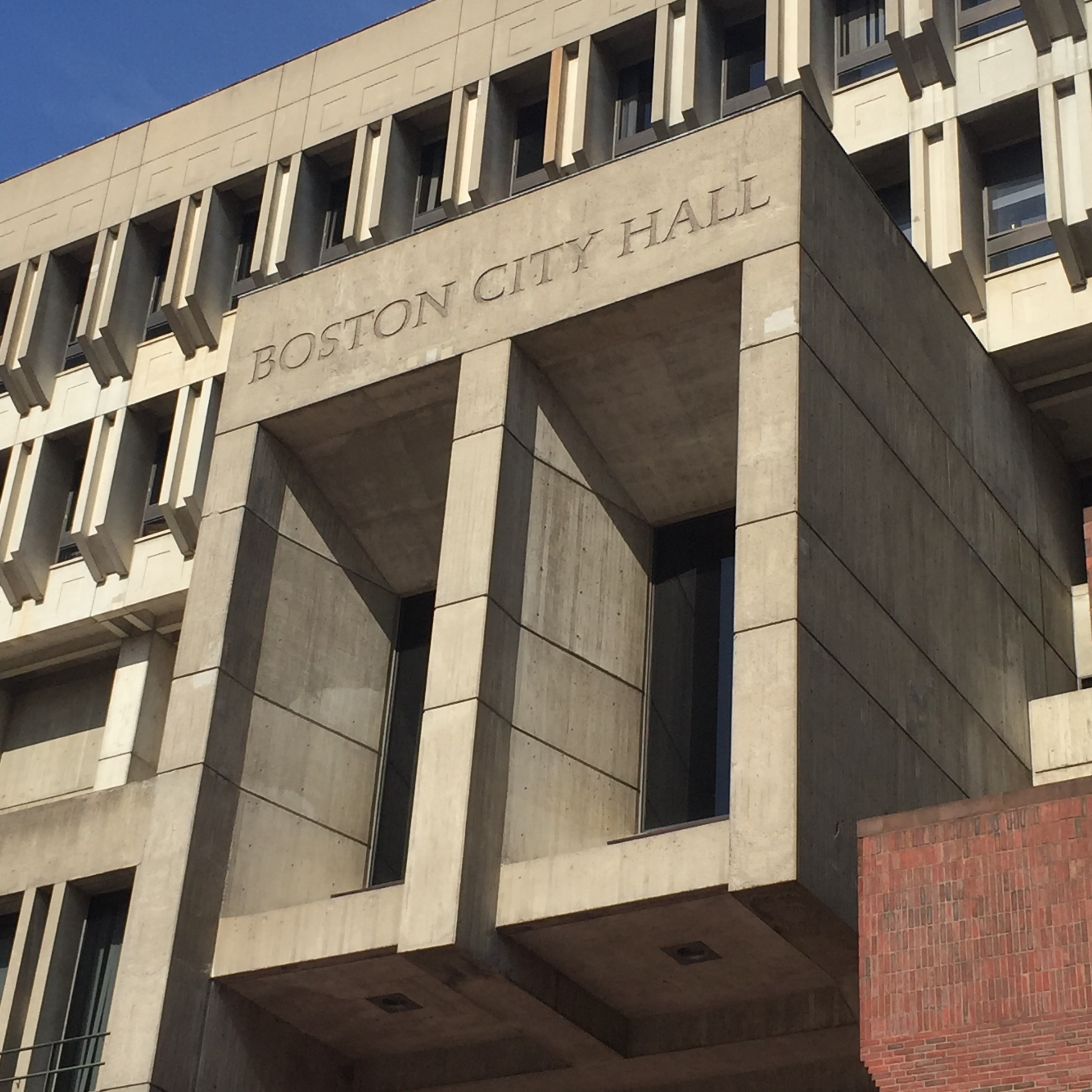
The building's name engraved onto the facade outside the council chamber's windows

Boston City Hall was primarily designed by the firm Kallmann McKinnell & Knowles (KMK), led by Gerhard Kallmann, Michael McKinnell, and Edward F. Knowles of Columbia University in New York. It was the first major building Kallmann or McKinnell had designed; neither man was a licensed architect, so they hired Knowles, who did hold a license. Campbell, Aldrich & Nulty were the associate architects, and LeMessurier Associates were the structural engineers. The plans were executed almost precisely to the original specifications.

The building is a major Brutalist-style work and an early example in Boston of a modernist design, as relatively few major structures had been built in Boston between the Wall Street crash of 1929 and the early 1960s. It includes similar design details to contemporary federal modernist buildings. The design was sometimes cited as being modeled after Le Corbusier's concrete monastery of Sainte Marie de La Tourette in France, although a 1962 article in The Architectural Review denied such comparisons.

The exterior is divided into three tiers, similar to how older buildings were horizontally split into three sections. The exterior tiers correspond with the tripartite interior layout, which includes a public lower section, a ceremonial intermediate section for elected officials, and an administrative upper section. This arrangement is similar to classical buildings, where the most important spaces were placed in piano nobiles raised above the ground level.

=== Form and facade ===
The building measures 322 by 250 feet (98 by 76 m) across at ground level. Its massing is composed of rectangular shapes surrounding a central courtyard. The exterior uses brick and concrete cladding, while bronze frames are installed around windows. The design uses few colors and is darker on the lower levels and lighter on the upper levels. All four elevations of the facade have different design features, which the architecture historian Sibyl Moholy-Nagy described as creating "a concept of harmonized contrast". The southern elevation has a more austere design; the eastern elevation has large concrete window frames and vehicular entrances; and the northern and western elevations were designed primarily for observers in the plaza. Including the central courtyard and plaza, the building has 417,000 square feet (38,700 m^{2}) of unenclosed, open-air space.

==== Lower tier ====
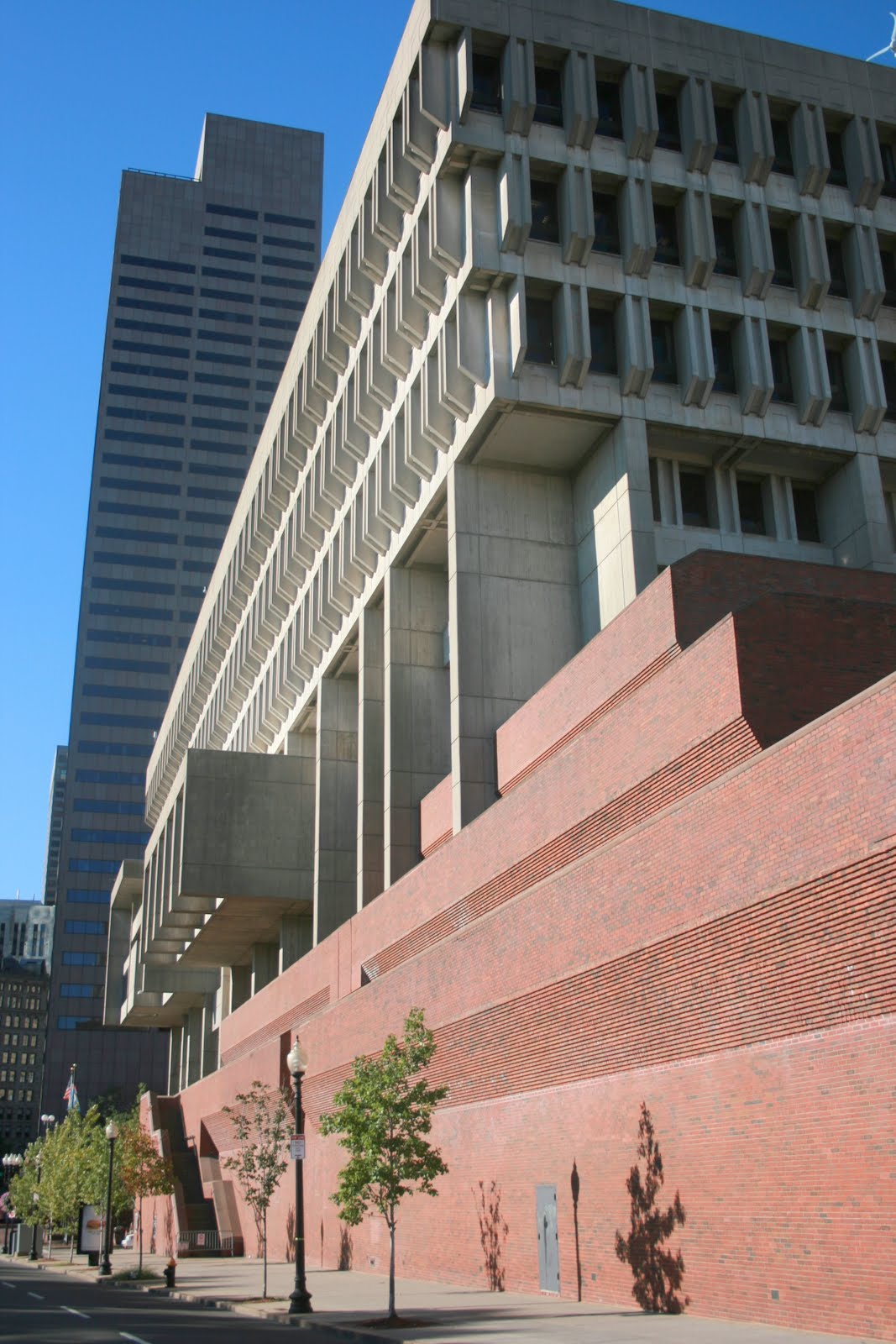
The brick mound seen from Congress Street

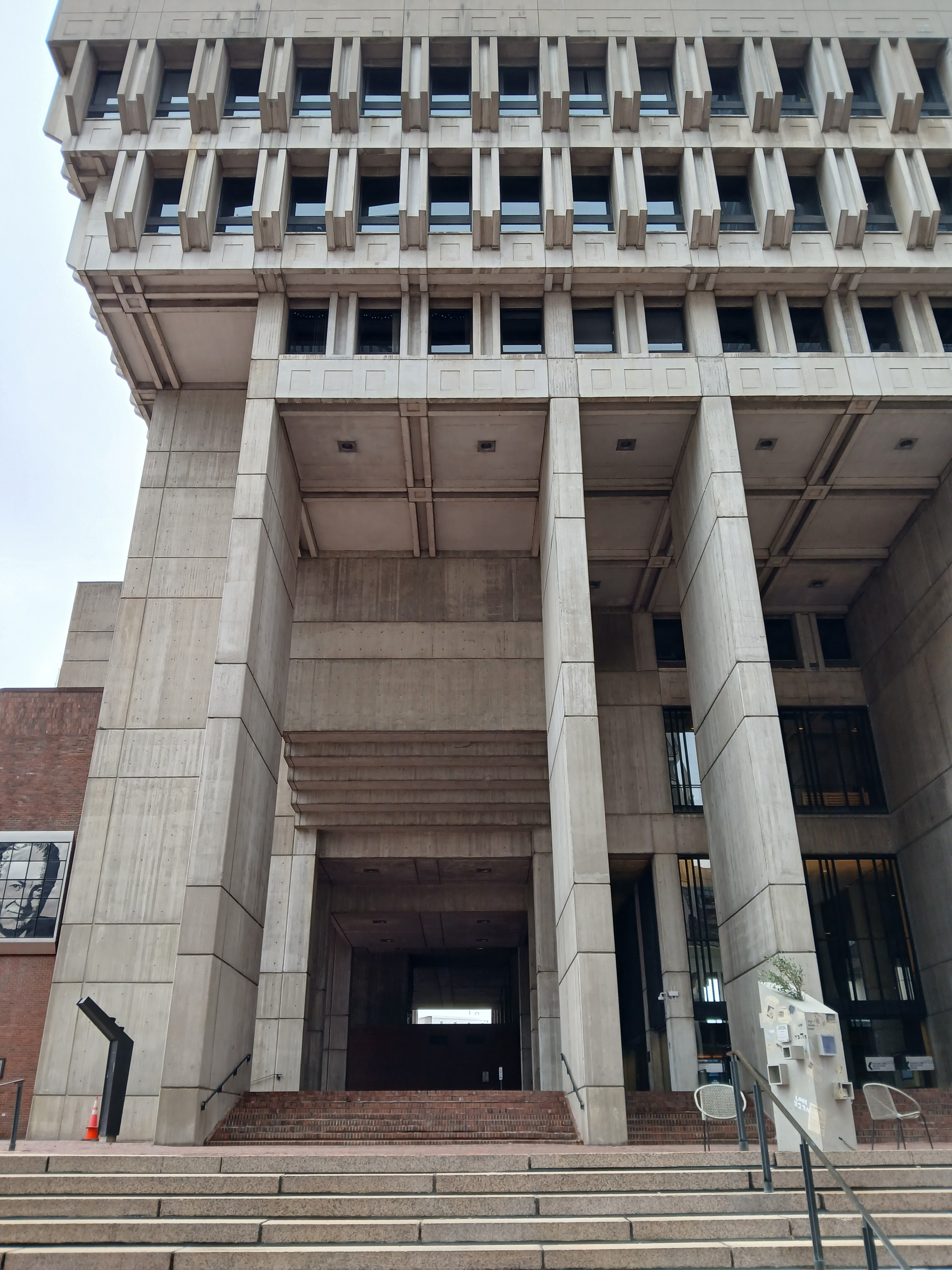
Southwestern entrance

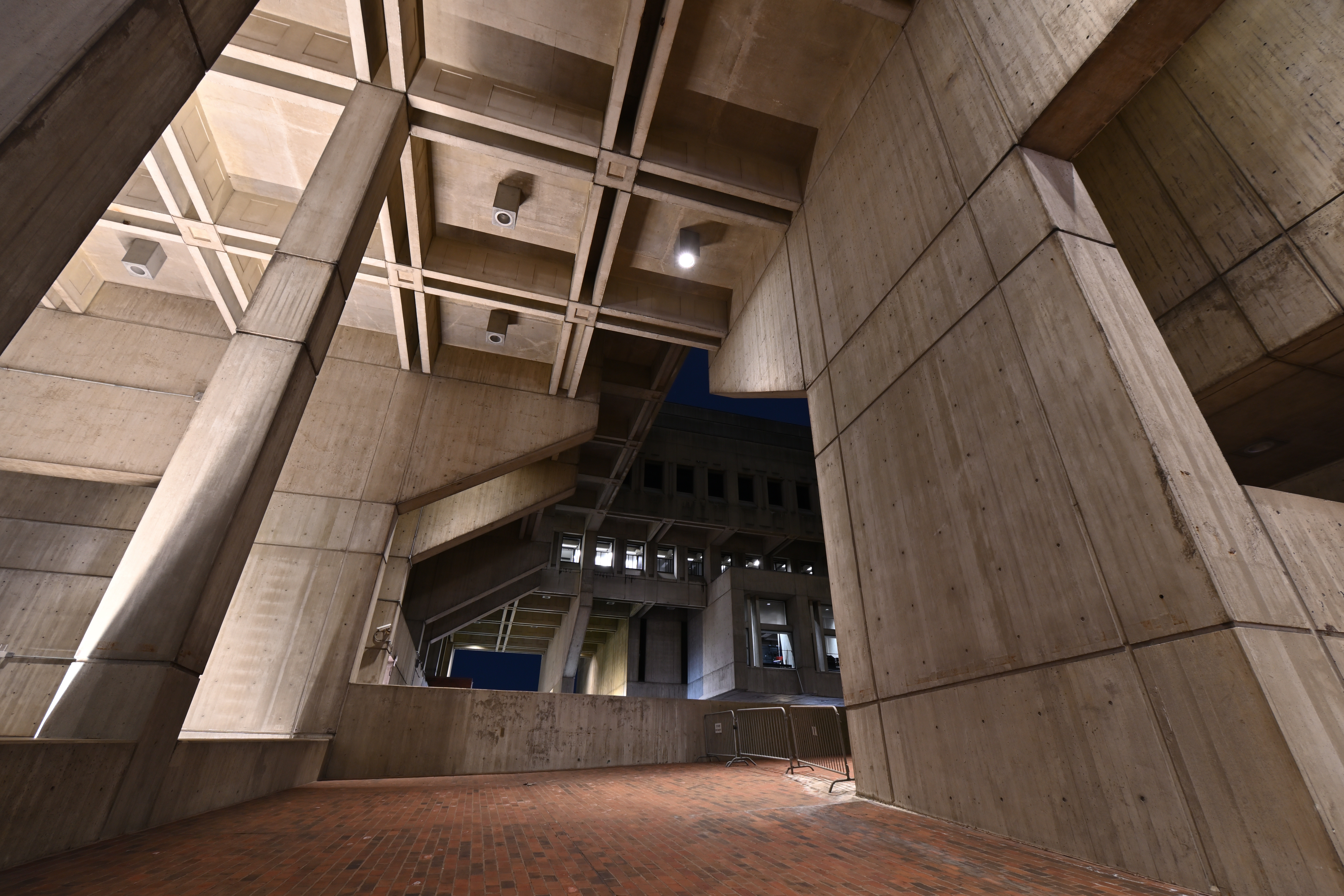
Coffered ceiling above the courtyard

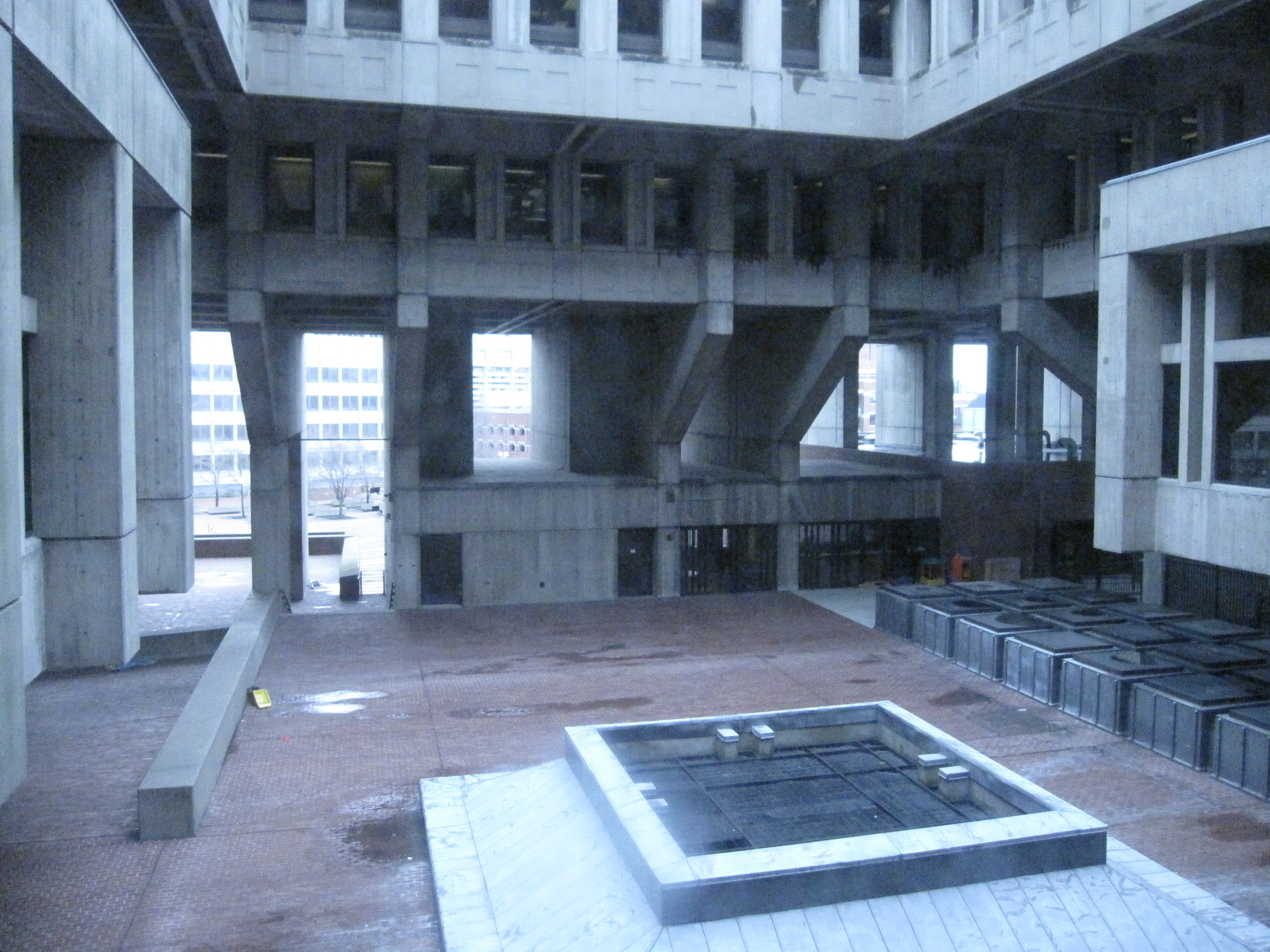
The courtyard facing south, with the skylight at bottom right

The lowest, public-facing tier is clad with brick; the parapet walls surrounding this tier are topped by copings made of brownstone. The lowest tier's massing and materials were intended to reference the geography and architecture of the nearby Beacon Hill neighborhood. Concrete piers rise up to 88 feet (27 m) above plaza level, acting as stilts underneath the upper floors. The spaces in the lowest tier are illuminated by slot windows on the walls and by skylights above, and there are corbels at numerous locations. Portions of the upper floors overhang the lower tier; the spaces underneath the overhang are used for storage and parking. The northeastern corner has a brick mound rising 57 feet (17 m), beneath which are the lower tier's public rooms. The brick wall facing Congress Street has corbels. A staircase running parallel to Congress Street, which is closed to the public, ascends to the central courtyard.

The central courtyard, on the fourth story, serves as the lowest tier's roof and measures 50 by 60 feet (15 by 18 m) across. It has a pyramidal skylight that overlooks the third floor, with a sloped base made of brick and concrete. The courtyard also has rectangular skylights, which are arranged in three rows of eleven, along the courtyard's eastern edge. Also on the courtyard's eastern boundary is a play area. In general, the courtyard has a brick floor, brownstone parapet copings, bronze railings around each opening, and concrete piers supporting the upper stories. Plate glass walls with steel mullions partially enclose the courtyard to the north and south. The periphery of the courtyard, beneath the upper stories, has a high coffered ceiling made of concrete. The courtyard occupies most of the fourth story, except for the southern section, which is part of the plaza lobby.

===== Entrances =====
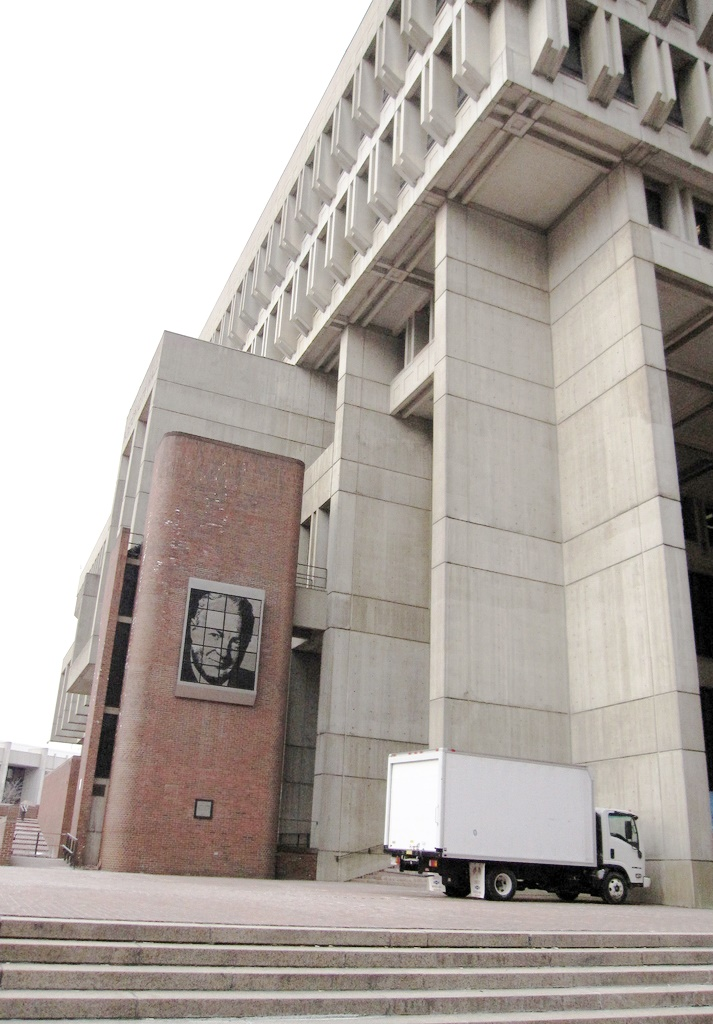
Southwestern entrance with mural of John F. Collins

The lowest tier has three exterior entrances, each providing access to a different story. The northern and southwestern entrances lead from City Hall Plaza, while the eastern entrance leads from Congress Street. A fourth entrance, from the interior courtyard, leads to the plaza level's fourth story. The eastern entrance, intended as the automotive entrance, serves the first floor. It is used by government employees and has a private elevator to the mayor's office. The eastern entrance is City Hall's primary entrance (particularly during off-hours when the other entrances are closed), despite not being planned as such. This entrance has a recessed garage door and a utilitarian pedestrian entrance, along with a horseshoe-shaped driveway leading to the mayor's entrance. To the right (or north) is a recessed, four-story brick wall without windows. The third story of that wall protrudes slightly, creating what Donlyn Lyndon called "a drear blank cliff".

Both plaza entrances have large curtain walls, with glass panes and steel mullions, and lead to brick foyers. The entrances were arranged so that people traveling between the plaza and Congress Street originally did not need to open any doors and could walk on a continuous brick pavement. The architects likened this arrangement to a European galleria or American shopping mall. The northern entrance, leading to the second floor, is accessed by a staircase with elongated, sloped treads.

The southwestern entrance (also described as the western or southern entrance) connects directly with the third-floor plaza lobby. It was originally accessed via a brick staircase, replaced in the 2020s with a ramp. Above is a concrete portico shaped like an inverted stair, located directly under the City Council chamber's seats. The glass doors and curtain wall are recessed from an open-air entrance vestibule. Adjoining the entrance is a brick shaft topped by corbels, which houses an emergency-exit staircase descending from the chamber. The shaft contains a mural of former Mayor John F. Collins, commissioned in 2004 by the Boston Art Commission.

==== Intermediate and upper tiers ====
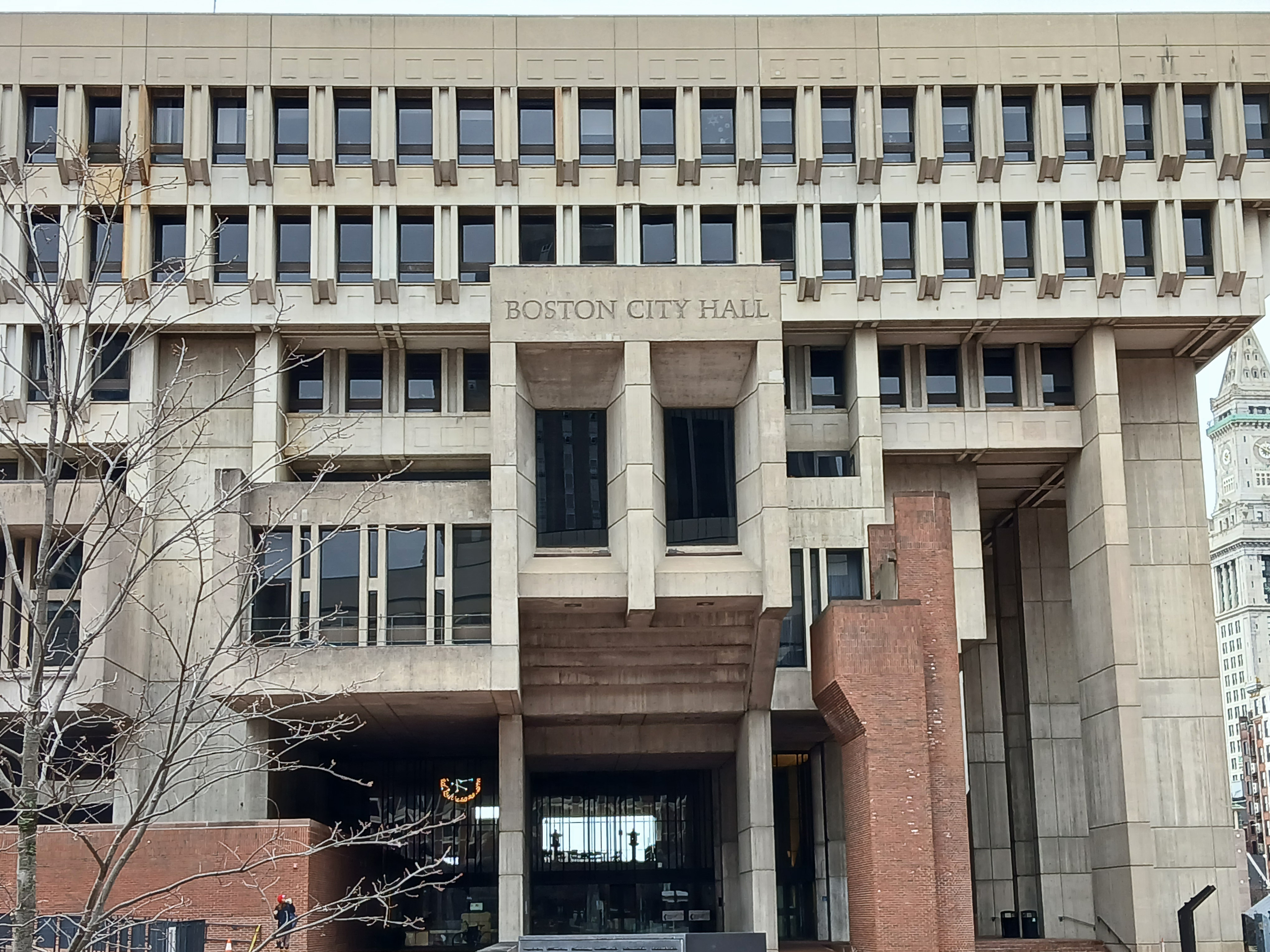
The hood around the council chamber's windows is higher than the others on the western elevation.

The concrete on the upper stories is left unfinished. The intermediate tier is made of cast-in-place concrete and has the most detail, despite being the smallest of the facade's three tiers. At multiple locations, concrete frames, sometimes known as "hoods", protrude from the massing. These delineate fifth-floor ceremonial spaces occupied by the mayor and City Council. Each hood is two stories high, with precast concrete used for the mullions between each window, and cast-in-place concrete elsewhere. The western elevation's hoods surround the windows from the City Council chamber and the councillors' offices; the council chamber's hood, above the southwestern entrance, is higher than the other tiers on that elevation. The hoods on the southern and eastern elevations adjoin the mayor's office. These hoods face nearby sites such as the Old State House and Faneuil Hall. At the southeastern corner, a pier adjoins hoods facing south and east, which are marked by L-shaped protrusions.

The uppermost tier uses precast concrete. The top three floors are cantilevered outward as they rise, which gives the impression of a large cornice and accommodated progressively larger floor areas on higher floors. There are also protruding fins, which consist of paired concrete slabs, carrying air-cooling ducts for perimeter offices. The windows are deeply recessed between the fins. Above the topmost floor, the outer facade has an entablature. The inner facades also have balconies overlooking lightwells above the courtyard. The inner facades step back at higher levels, creating larger lightwells, and the western and eastern elevations of the inner facades have hoods. The flat roof has numerous openings and mechanical dormer structures, which are visible from nearby buildings, functioning as a "fifth facade".

=== Interior ===
The interior spans 513,000 square feet (47,700 m^{2}) and is divided into three sections, corresponding to the facade's tiers. This arrangement was deliberate, allowing the public to more easily access the most-used governmental functions. The public transaction zone, on the first through fourth stories, hosts activities that require extensive interaction with the public, such as applications, registrations, or permit issuances. The transaction zone has several ramps, stairs, and escalators; these were intended to reduce congestion in the third-floor plaza lobby and created what Moholy-Nagy described as "a daily experience for citizens on the way to other business". The intermediate tier consists of the elected officials' ceremonial spaces on the fifth floor. Nonpublic administrative offices are located on the sixth through ninth stories, which housed departments such as personnel and budget, along with the BRA. The rooms were mostly designed by ISD Inc, with Vida Stribys as project manager and Carol Lipper as graphic designer. Higher stories are lighter-colored than lower stories, matching the exterior variations in tone.

City Hall's foundation includes deep-level pilings. The above-ground superstructure is made of concrete and divides the interiors into bays measuring 14 1/3 feet (4.4 m) wide; columns are spaced one to two bays apart. These bays are further divided into modules measuring 2 2/3 or 4 1/2 feet (0.81 or 1.37 m) apart. Elevator cores to the north and south serve the interior. The northern core has four passenger elevators, while the southern core has three; there is also a combined freight–passenger elevator and a private mayor's elevator. The southern elevators do not stop at the courtyard (fourth) level, which is instead served by a wheelchair lift and the northern elevator core. The northern elevators skip the fifth story; the southern elevator cabs, which do serve the fifth story, label it as "Mayor" or "Council". Most stories have low ceilings, above which are mechanical plenum spaces supported by Vierendeel trusses. (Note: Mildred F. Schmertz cites the office floors as having 8 1/2-foot (2.6 m) ceilings and 5-foot-deep (1.5 m) mechanical plenums. Sibyl Moholy-Nagy gives the ceiling height as 8 5/6 feet (2.7 m) and the mechanical plenum depth as 4 1/3 feet (1.3 m).) The fifth floor has higher ceilings than the other stories, variously cited as 14 feet (4.3 m) or 18 feet (5.5 m) tall. Mechanical ducts rise through the elevator cores and extend horizontally across the trusses. Underfloor ducts are installed under the concrete floor slabs.

==== Plaza lobby ====
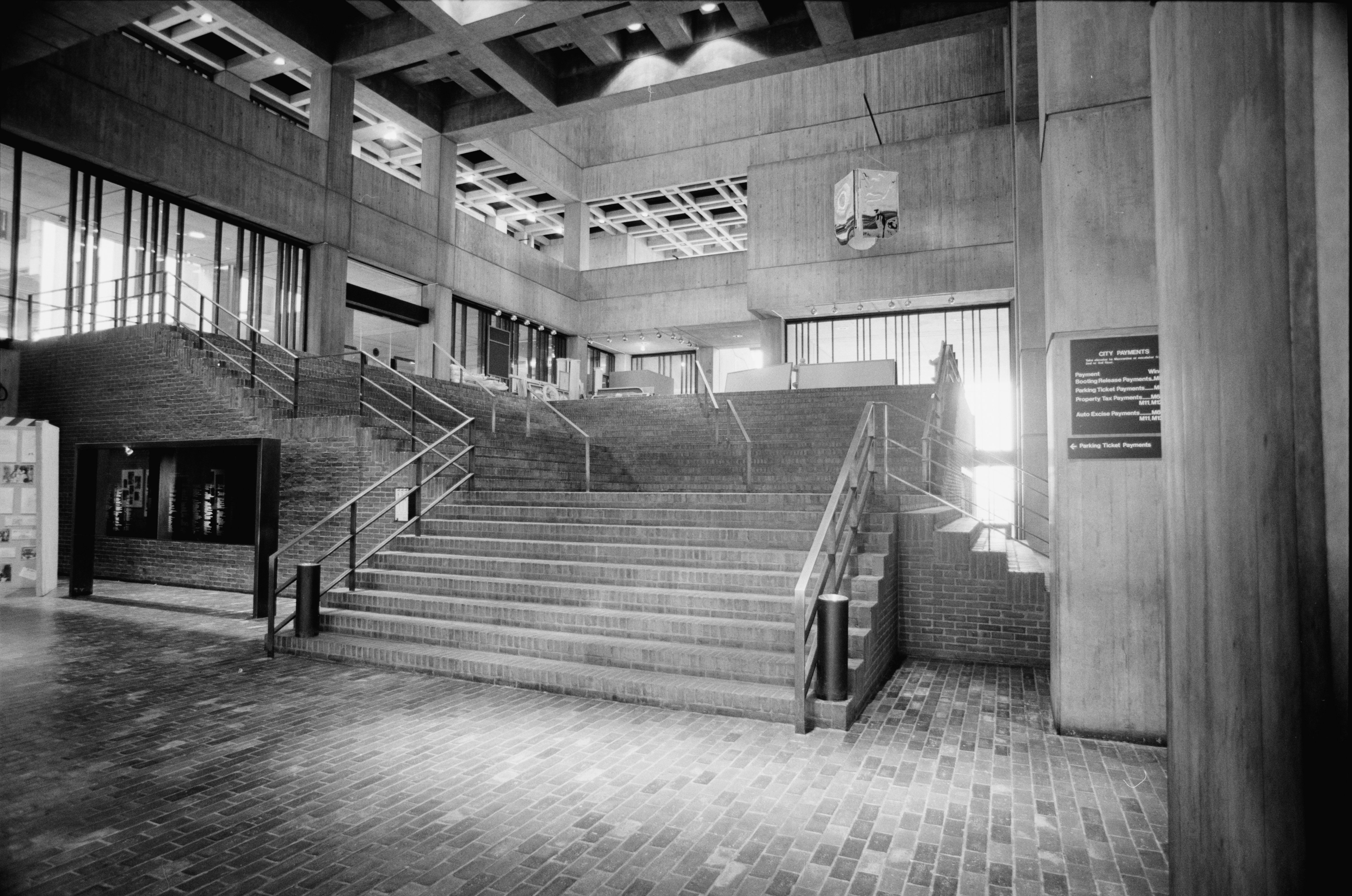
The plaza lobby's grand stair

On the third floor is the plaza lobby, accessed via a foyer from the southwestern entrance. Its floors use mottled New England brick, a continuation of the brick surfaces in the plaza and courtyard. This lobby has a concrete switchback staircase ascending directly to the mayor's office. The mayor's staircase is surrounded by concrete walls on three sides and has pulpit-like open-air landings on the fourth, from which the mayor could address citizens. A brick grand staircase, shaped like an amphitheater, ascends to a courtyard-level mezzanine. The lobby's wheelchair lift is mounted to the grand staircase's railing. From the courtyard level, there are doors to the courtyard and a smaller terrazzo staircase to the fifth floor. KMK's architects described the amphitheatrical design was deliberate, saying, "Things could happen here".

The plaza lobby is illuminated by two concrete lightwells that rise to the roof. The lightwells are cited as measuring 124 feet (38 m), 135 feet (41 m), or 138 feet (42 m) high. Each lightwell has narrow windows on its northern and southern faces, and the western lightwell is located directly above the southwestern entrance. The lobby has a security desk, information booth, and cafe and is served by the southern elevator core. Above the lobby are a coffered concrete ceiling, Vierendeel trusses, and a fifth-story overpass.

==== Lower-level lobbies ====
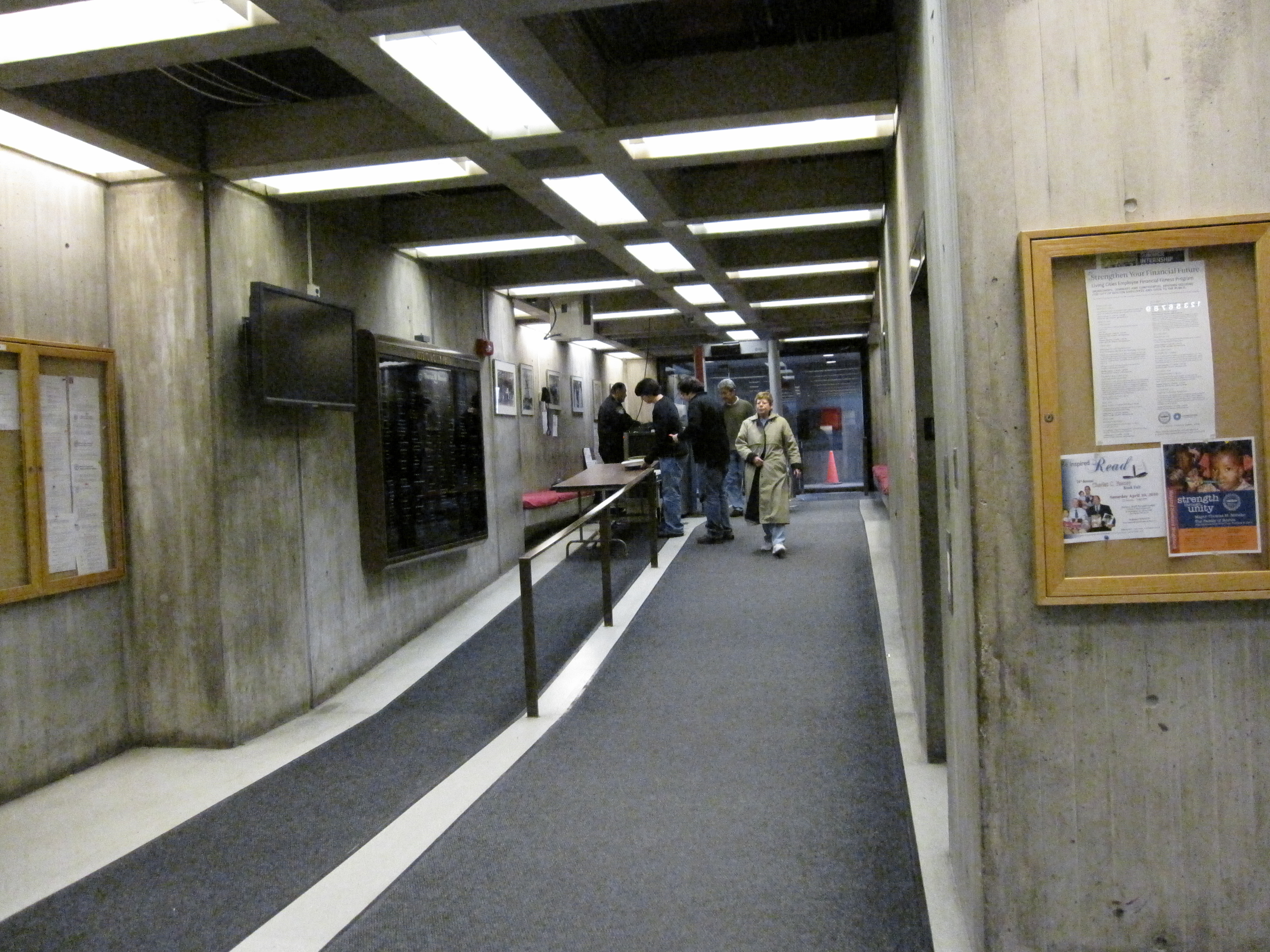
The small first-floor lobby and vestibule

The Congress Street entrance leads to a small first-floor vestibule, which leads to a ramp that slopes down to a similarly small inner lobby. These spaces have concrete walls and a coffered concrete ceiling with Vierendeel trusses. The inner lobby connects with the southern elevator core, along with an open stair to the second floor.

The transaction zone's primary space is the northern concourse, located on the second floor. The northern concourse is accessed through the northern entrance. The concourse has brick, tile, and concrete walls and floors, along with terraces bordered by concrete parapets. The coffered concrete ceilings are held up by Vierendeel trusses. Ramps connect the various departments, and escalators rise to the plaza lobby. The northern concourse has counters for public transactions. The counters have openings behind aluminum grilles and are separated by concrete fins with pedestals. The northern concourse's arrangement enabled it to accommodate 5,000 visitors per day. Many of the counters have since been closed because their respective activities could be conducted online.

==== Ceremonial spaces ====
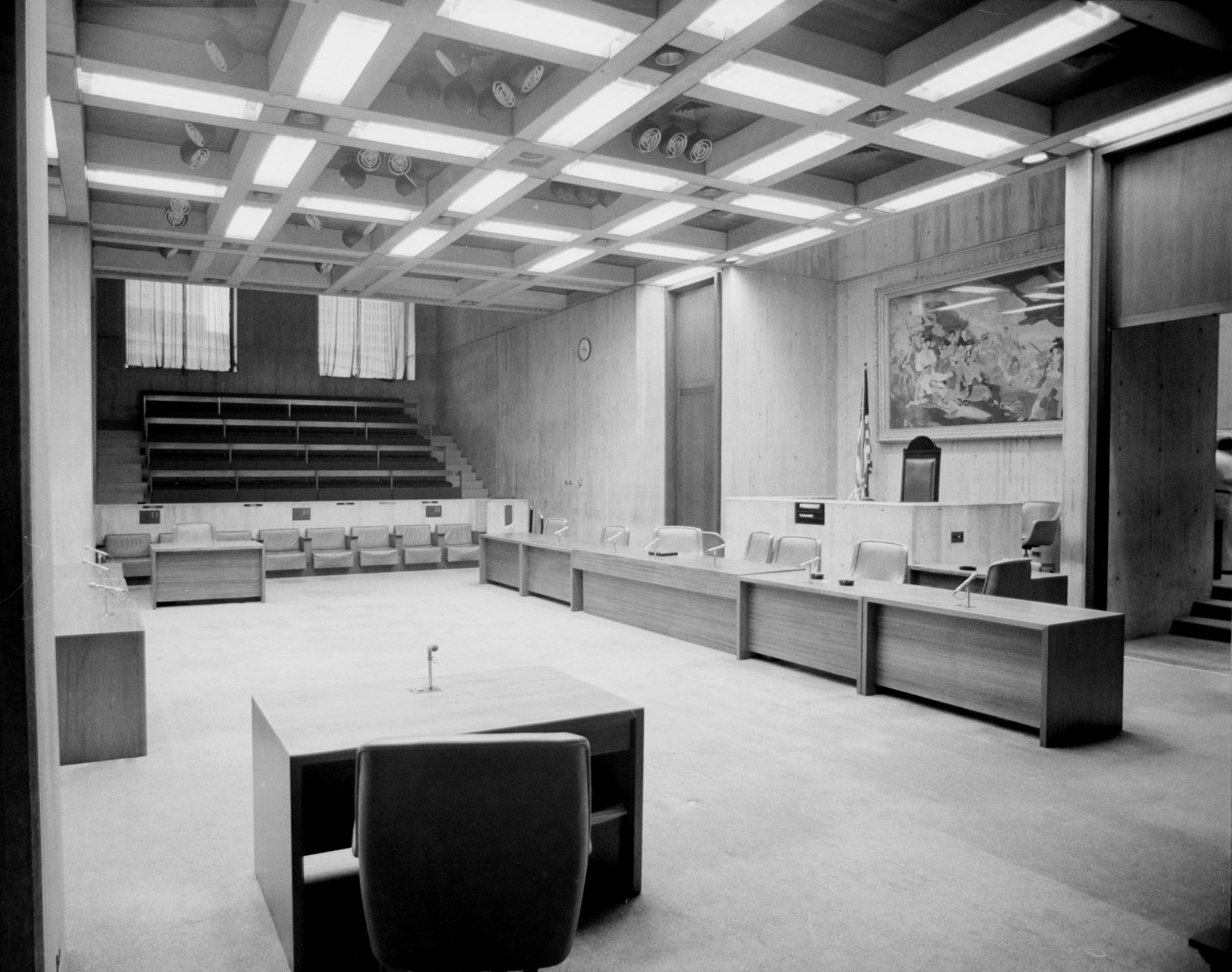
The council chamber

The fifth floor contains the City Council chamber, the councillors' offices, and the mayor's suite; all these rooms are connected by the plaza-lobby overpass, which has concrete parapets. The spaces have seating areas and upholstered leather furniture. A reception room with concrete benches connects the council chamber and councillors' offices. The council chamber, named for former Councillor Christopher A. Iannella, is directly above the southwestern (plaza lobby) entrance. It has a similar seating arrangement to a theatre-in-the-round, with sloped seating for the public on three sides of the room, accommodating 120 people. Councillors sat in the chamber's central area, and there was a concrete platform on the fourth side, modified during a 2017 accessibility upgrade. The chamber was smaller than the one at Old City Hall, and the chamber's design blocked citizens' sightlines of each other.

Councillors' offices are north of the council chamber. Originally, the building had nine councillors' offices lining the western side of the fifth floor, each consisting of a reception room and a window-facing workspace. City Hall's original reference library was converted to four additional councillors' offices in 1983; these offices are on the floor's eastern side. The City Council also has two meeting rooms: the Piemonte Room (part of the former library) and the Curley Room. The Curley Room abuts an anteroom that is used as the current reference library.

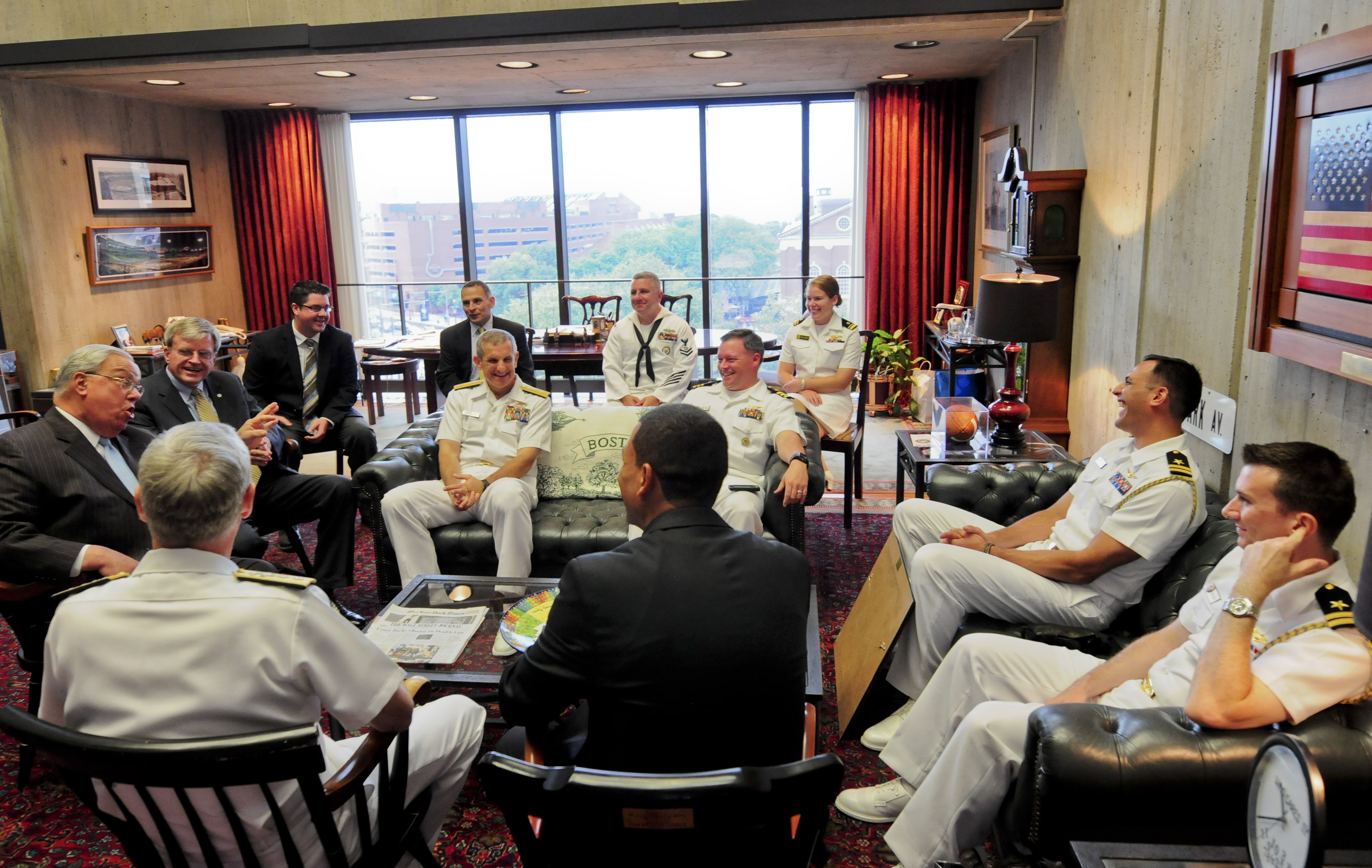
Mayor Menino talking to sailors in the mayor's office in 2012

The mayor's suite, at the southeastern corner, is accessed by the private elevator and the plaza lobby staircase. It is a double-height space with staff offices and a reception area. Ann Sullivan and Tom Rowlands designed many of the rooms in the mayor's suite, in contrast to the rest of the interior designed by ISD. The original decorations (since replaced) included bronze wall panels, African mahogany furniture, leather upholstery, and a wool carpet. The spaces are finished in concrete and wood, and there are curtains to block sunlight. Abutting the southern elevator core is a reception room with bronze walls and geometric lighting fixtures. A hallway from the reception room leads to the other rooms, including the staff offices, The eastern wall has a large window with a hood. The south end of the mayor's suite, illuminated by its own large window, is the Eagle Room, which splits off the main hallway. The Eagle Room is decorated in concrete and has a wooden eagle; it originally functioned as the mayor's private office before becoming a meeting room. There is also a bedroom and bathroom.

==== Administrative stories ====
The building contains 318,000 square feet (29,500 m^{2}) of offices. The offices all have asbestos-tiled floors, except for private offices that use wool carpets. The hallways have terrazzo floors, along with bronze paneling and mahogany doors. There are also clear-glass dividers abutting the hallways and translucent glass around rooms that require privacy. Drywall was used for partitions between offices, since drywall partitions could be more easily removed than solid masonry. The floors, ceiling trusses, and ceilings are made of concrete, and there is glazed-metal mechanical equipment. The interiors are illuminated by both natural light and by recessed lighting fixtures. The ceilings are subdivided into grids, within which the recessed lighting is installed. The architects said the ceiling design was intended to counter the cramped design of traditional offices, though City Hall's offices were themselves later described as cramped.

The offices originally had white oak furniture on the upper stories and mahogany furniture on the lower stories, which had either plastic or wood finishes depending on where the furniture was installed. The furniture has brown leather or colorful nylon-and-wool upholstery, chrome or stainless-steel accents, and black accessories. The furnishings lacked color aside from the upholstery. The offices were originally outfitted with monolithic desks, which contain embedded drawers; the design allowed for concealed wiring and eliminated the need for traditional table legs. More than 1,300 custom desks were made for the offices. The spaces otherwise have mass-produced furniture, and the public floors' furnishings were intended to match the millwork used in the design. The spaces also have Donegal Carpets.

Some of the offices are under the brick mound. The lower-level offices are largely windowless, with some skylights; the mound also contains ancillary spaces and a garage. The lower stories use quarry tile and brick. The upper-level offices' original open plan layout has been subdivided over the years, and several offices connect with the interior courtyard's balconies. The upper levels' hallways originally had a consistent design and layout, which has since been modified in several locations. The southern portion of the eighth floor originally contained the O'Neill Public Hearing Room, a high-ceilinged space that was later subdivided. There are full-height windows along both the interior and exterior facades, which originally lacked curtains because they were shaded by the protruding floors above.

== Reception ==
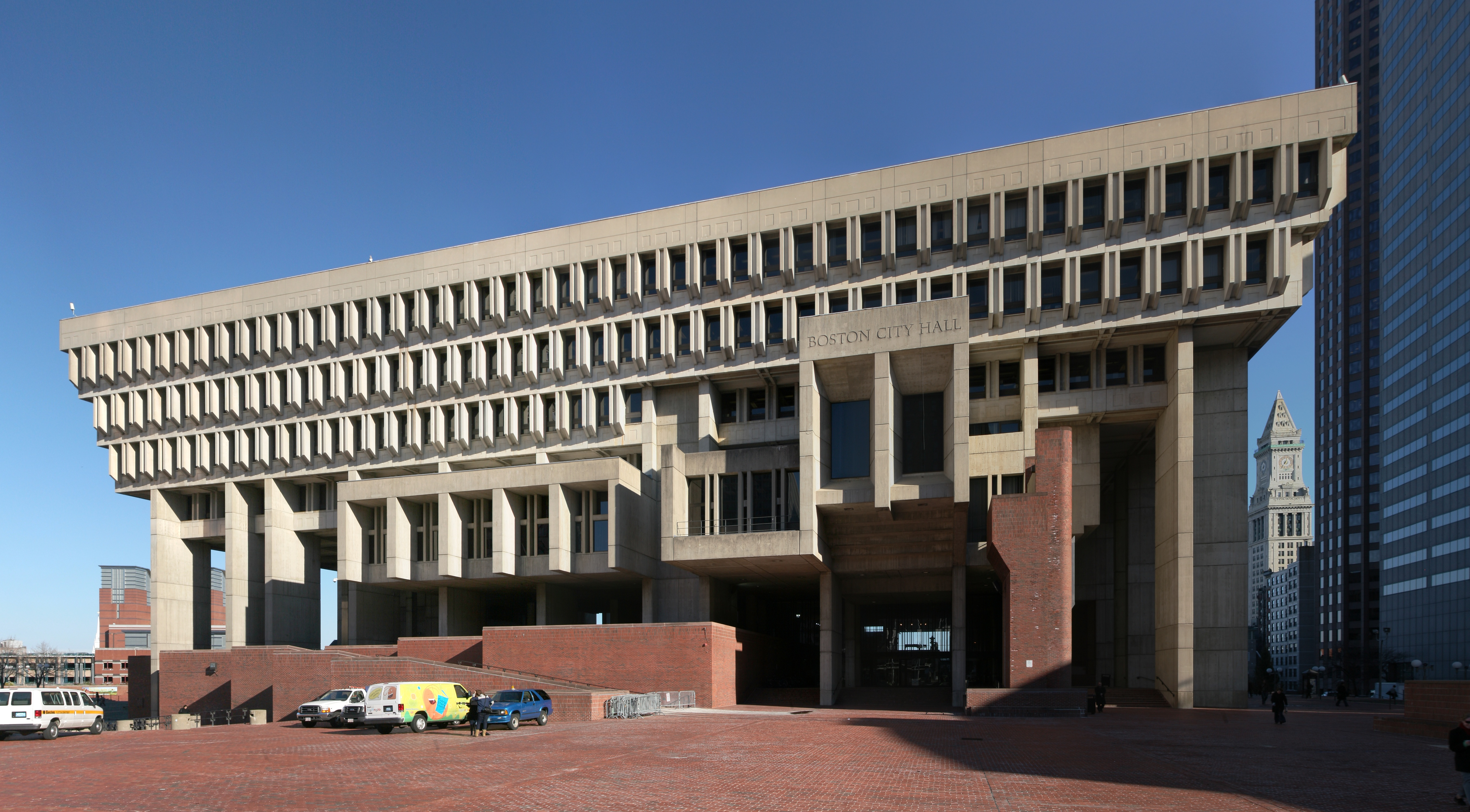
Over the years, the design of City Hall (seen here from the west) has received extensive architectural commentary.

Over the years, City Hall's design has received extensive architectural commentary. It has often been described as receiving praise from architectural critics and criticism from the public, although writer Brian Sirman called this description a myth initiated by architectural critic Ada Louise Huxtable. Sirman classified the commentary as encompassing five categories: the building's symbolism, usability, esthetics, architectural context, and plaza.

The design variously elicited extreme disdain or appreciation. Two writers said that hardly anyone was neutral on City Hall's design, while Sirman, quoting A Tale of Two Cities, wrote that much of the commentary was "in the superlative degree of comparison only". Writing about the design's continued divisiveness, ArchDaily called City Hall "one of the most debated examples of Brutalist architecture in the United States" in 2025, while Atomic Ranch magazine said in 2023: "If there is one building that divides Bostonians, it is the notorious Boston City Hall." The Michelin Green Guide said the building "has been one of Boston's controversial architectural statements" from its inception.

=== Contemporary ===
==== During development ====
When the design was unveiled at the Museum of Fine Arts, Mayor Collins was described as exhibiting surprise "in every line of his face"; he later called it "monumental" and "exciting". One observer reportedly exclaimed, "What the hell is that?", while others gave "less than complimentary remarks" or sighs of approval. Members of the City Council likened it to a gas station or Chinese pagoda. Edward Logue, Governor John Volpe, and Senator Ted Kennedy all expressed appreciation of the design. Among the general public, the design was divisive, and the writer David Monteyne said that critics often invoked "civic or national identity" in denouncing the design. Several commentators compared it to exotic structures such as a temple, an inverted pagoda, and the tomb of Khufu. Others compared it to an inverted Lincoln Memorial or to Lenin's Mausoleum, or implied that the design was "terribly confused" or "a hodgepodge". Architecture magazine Horizon characterized the design as a blend of styles including "WPA post-office colonial" and "neo-Fascist Federal".

The architectural press and modernist architects generally liked the building, while more traditional architects generally did not. Time magazine praised the design as "exotically daring", citing the juxtaposition of modern and classical elements. The Boston Society of Architects (BSA) endorsed the design, The Architectural Record said it would "stand close critical and functional inspection", and Bauhaus architect Walter Gropius characterized it as "a beautiful scheme". Philip Johnson, who advocated for a more International Style approach to modernism, was nonetheless congratulatory of the winning plan. Huxtable wrote that the design was as "extreme" as those of the state buildings. Local traditionalist architects William Stanley Parker and Edward T. P. Graham felt that the design was too futuristic to be appealing. A group of 18 opponents, led by Parker, advocated for the original design to be rejected.

During construction, the building frequently attracted commentary. The New York Times compared it to a beehive, the architect Pietro Belluschi regarded the building as "its own expression of architecture", and the Architects' Journal wrote that City Hall was a conscious attempt "to make architecture and to contribute something to the community". Midway during construction, Boston Globe architectural critic Joseph Eldridge praised the views and the structure's complexity, and Wolf Von Eckardt predicted that the building, along with the Dulles International Airport Main Terminal, would most likely become "the greatest on the American scene in a decade or two". Conversely, architectural professor Charles W. Eliot II wrote in The Christian Science Monitor that the building did not appeal to him despite its "ponderosity and jutting overhangs", and modernist architect Edward Durell Stone likened it to a packing crate. As the building was nearing completion, Mildred F. Schmertz of the Architectural Record called the design a victory for the architects. Time magazine wrote that the brutalist design expressed that "city governments are under constant attack", and Boston Globe writer Robert Goodman said that "its setting and theme are a disturbing symbol of city government" because the design served to reinforce, rather than reduce, separations between politicians and citizens. Fello Atkinson wrote that City Hall's design, which he described as promising when first unveiled, was blunted by the presence of neighboring buildings.

==== Post-completion ====
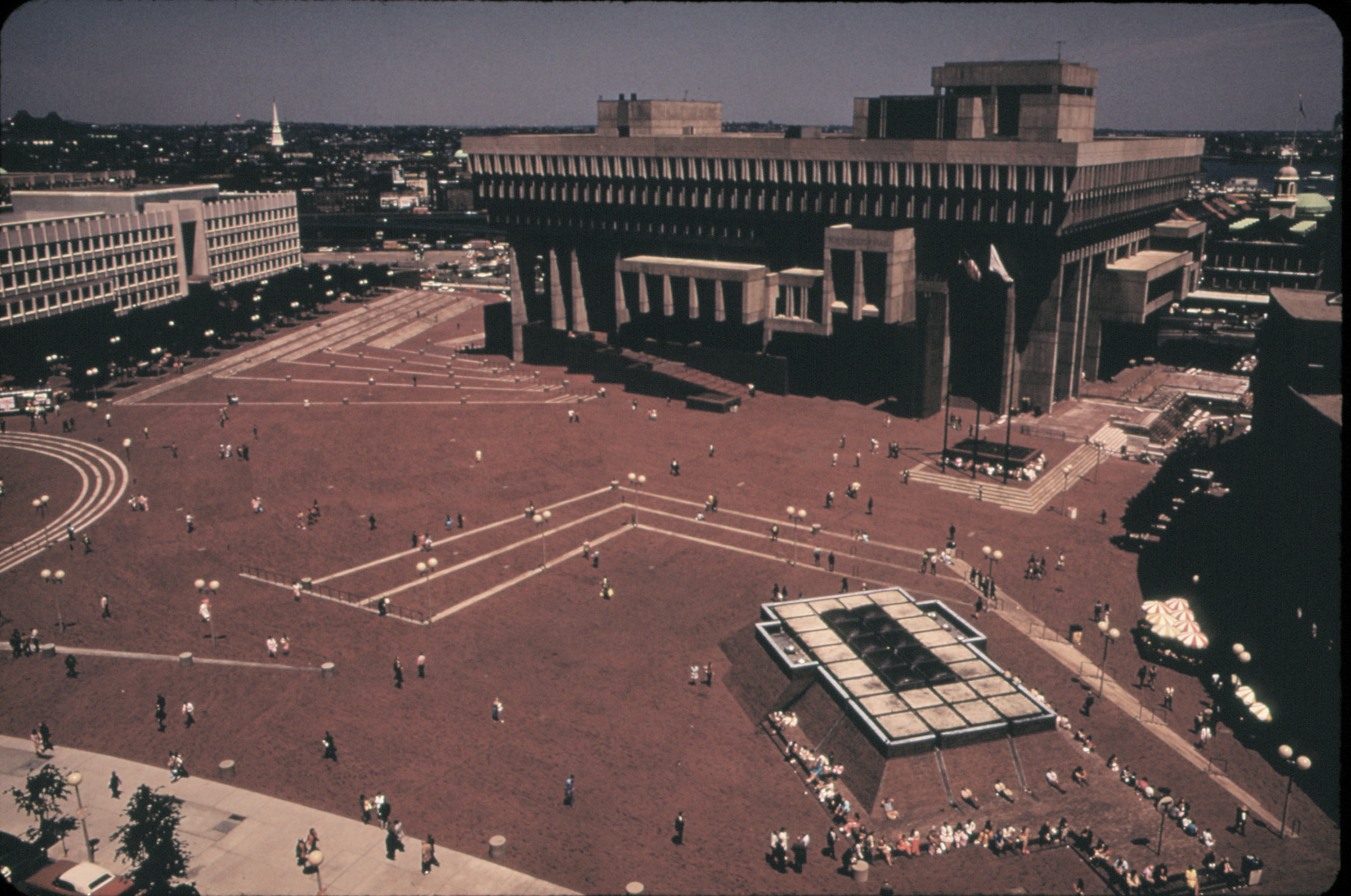
City Hall and City Hall Plaza in 1973, with distant view of Old North Church and I-93 (at left), and Faneuil Hall (at right). Though City Hall received architectural accolades upon its completion, the public disliked the completed structure.

When completed, City Hall was largely praised in the architectural community and in the popular media. Huxtable praised the boldness of the architectural style and the resultant symbolism, and she later wrote that "in this focal building Boston sought, and got, excellence". The Baltimore Sun called it "unquestionably a brilliant architectural achievement". Mayor White, who initially had trouble acclimating to the design, told the Sun that the building's architecture and usability were "superb". Olga Gueft of Interiors magazine called it a victory on multiple fronts, including esthetically and symbolically, and Von Eckardt regarded the building as the best American design since Rockefeller Center in the 1930s. Fusion magazine called City Hall a design "to be experienced" and wrote that it did not feel claustrophobic despite the imposing massing, although the writer felt the interior could be more colorful. Architecture writers also praised the building as symbolizing a more transparent government and lauded its mixture of classical and modernist design principles. Architectural historian Walter Muir Whitehill wrote that

it is as fine a building for its time and place as Boston has ever produced. Traditionalists who long for a revival of Bulfinch simply do not realize that one does not achieve a handsome monster either by enlarging, or endlessly multiplying, the attractive elements of smaller structures.

The Christian Science Monitor wrote that City Hall's design had introduced esthetics rather than being a purely functional building, to mixed effect. Art historian Vincent Scully said that City Hall and its plaza gave the impression "that civilization must have already ended", even as he wrote that the building exhibited the most basic competencies of urbanistic design. British architect Nikolaus Pevsner felt the building was domineering and top-heavy, and American preservationist architect James Marston Fitch regarded the overhanging upper stories as extraneous. In their book Learning from Las Vegas, the architects Steven Izenour, Denise Scott Brown, and Robert Venturi expressed doubts that such a monumental design was appropriate for a municipal occupant. By the early 1970s, American architects were described as nearly unanimously supportive of City Hall's design.

Architectural commentary also focused on specific design details. Gueft wrote that the hoods framing the monumental fifth-story spaces symbolized governmental transparency. Several writers criticized the interior circulation, including Sibyl Moholy-Nagy, who wrote that the brick stairs from the south lobby led to spaces that were not particularly important. By contrast, Conti regarded the south lobby as more impressive than any of the other interior spaces, and Gueft called the stair "an escalier worthy of Piranesi". The Globe described the mayor's office as "one of the most comfortable public offices in existence". The design's contrast with nearby architecture also received notice. David Ellis of the Globe called it "as much a product of the environment of Boston as the Old State House", but even the building's defenders, including Moholy-Nagy and Peter Collins, noted that it was more similar to European design ideals than to Boston's traditional architecture.

Many members of the public disliked the completed structure, and calls for City Hall's demolition were made even before construction was finished. Architecture Plus writer Ellen Perry Berkeley interviewed members of the public shortly after the building's completion, who overwhelmingly described it negatively. Berkeley, observing that citizens described City Hall as "cold", "monstrous", and "overbearing", expressed surprise at the reactions, given the positive architectural commentary. The Wall Street Journal writer John Conti said the building's design demonstrated its function well and was "among the finest pieces of public architecture in America", but he also quoted residents who called it overly lavish, fortress-like, and having excessive "wasted space". One commentator, rebutting a positive review by Von Eckardt, called it "distant, oppressive, hulking". The popular media's reaction to the completed building was mostly subdued or begrudgingly accepting.

=== Retrospective ===
In later years, the building's symbolism was even more widely debated. Views of City Hall did not become more positive over time, and as brutalism became less popular, the design attracted increasing negative commentary. Even so, criticisms of its design were often met by strident defenses. In the 1980s, the Boston Landmarks Commission (BLC) called City Hall "one of the most significant Boston buildings of the 20th century". Huxtable wrote for The New York Times that the building's design continued to exude a "strength and probity" typically missing from Boston's government, while Paul Goldberger of the same publication called it "ambitious but harsh and unwelcoming". The Globe's architecture critic, Robert Campbell, wrote in 1988 that City Hall was still a "memorable and powerful image". Campbell said the public disdained the building because it lacked traditional elements of civic architecture, such as grand staircases or domes, and he later wrote that public sentiments generally favored more traditional styles. Criticism also arose from the lack of color or material variety, the shadows cast by the upper stories, and the poor state of repair. Contrary to the architects' desire that the design convey openness, the materials and layout created the opposite impression. Decades after City Hall's completion, Kallmann dismissed concerns about negative commentary, once saying that "we can wait".

An Architectural Review writer said of City Hall's continued criticism in 2000, "Why Boston today is so suspicious of the modern and the new is a mystery", while Douglass Shand-Tucci called City Hall "a great and worthy landmark" the same year. The Michelin Green Guide gave City Hall a two-star rating (out of three stars), higher than other Boston sites such as the Paul Revere House, Public Garden, or State House. The proposed demolition in 2006 elicited mixed commentary, even among architects. Alex Beam of the Globe called the building a mistake that merited demolition, while the architect Donlyn Lyndon wrote that City Hall "carries an authority that results from the clarity, articulation, and intensity of imagination with which it has been formed". Huxtable and Campbell contrasted City Hall's poor treatment with the 2000s restoration of Yale University's A&A Building, and Preservation magazine said the antipathy toward City Hall in 2007 was similar to that garnered by the A&A Building in the 1960s. A writer for the New Criterion in 2014 said that the A&A and City Hall buildings were "characterized by an earnest and overwhelming monumentality".

The building's 50th anniversary in 2019 prompted a variety of commentary. Anthony Flint called City Hall "an elegant, successful work of architecture", and architect Aaron Betsky wrote that City Hall "is one of the last concrete examples of government willing to fight for what it thinks is right, which is, or should be, or [sic] common good." Brian Sirman, who wrote a book about City Hall, said he had initially intended to disprove negative conceptions of the building but found himself convinced by them. When McKinnell died in 2020, Joseph Giovannini of The New York Times said the design had been a rebuttal to glass-and-steel structures that were then commonplace across the country. Mayor Wu, one of the few 2021 mayoral candidates to support the design, described the building as a "treasure". After the building became an official Boston Landmark in 2025, Murray Whyte called it a successful brutalist design but said it failed to blend in with the "urban fabric".

=== Rankings ===
City Hall received architectural accolades upon its completion. These included, in 1969, the American Institute of Architects' Honor Award and the BSA's Parker Medal. In a 1976 poll of the United States' greatest buildings, historians and architects ranked City Hall as the nation's eighth-best building, (Note: Sometimes described as being ranked sixth or seventh. However, a 2013 analysis by the AIA listed the seven buildings or building groups ranked ahead of City Hall: the University of Virginia campus, Rockefeller Center, Dulles International Airport Main Terminal, Fallingwater, Carson Pirie Scott Building, Seagram Building, and PSFS Building.) tied with Trinity Church.

City Hall is often placed on lists of ugliest buildings. Travel agency Virtualtourist listed the building as the world's ugliest in a 2008 poll, and California Home + Design magazine wrote in 2013 that City Hall was one of "25 Buildings to Demolish Right Now". In 2018, Curbed Boston included City Hall on its list of Boston's "10 ugliest buildings". The website Buildworld.co ranked City Hall as the world's fourth-ugliest building and the U.S.'s second-ugliest behind the J. Edgar Hoover Building in 2023. Conversely, Boston magazine ranked it the city's best building in 2018, out of a list of 100, and a Curbed contributor that year called Boston City Hall one of the country's 10 most beautiful city halls. In 2026, Architectural Record magazine included City Hall on its list of "the most significant works of American Architecture".

== Legacy ==
=== Landmark designation ===
In the 1980s, Historic Preservation magazine called City Hall one of the US's "widely admired" modernist buildings that lacked an official landmark designation, along with the Solomon R. Guggenheim Museum and the Dulles Main Terminal. Amid Menino's plans to sell the building, architects and preservationists petitioned to make the building a city landmark, saying that City Hall symbolized the era during which it was built. The agency placed City Hall on its pending landmarks list in 2007, allowing it to consider the building for landmark status in the future. The BLC voted on December 10, 2024, to recommend landmark designation, and City Hall became an official Boston Landmark on January 24, 2025.

=== Architectural influence and media ===
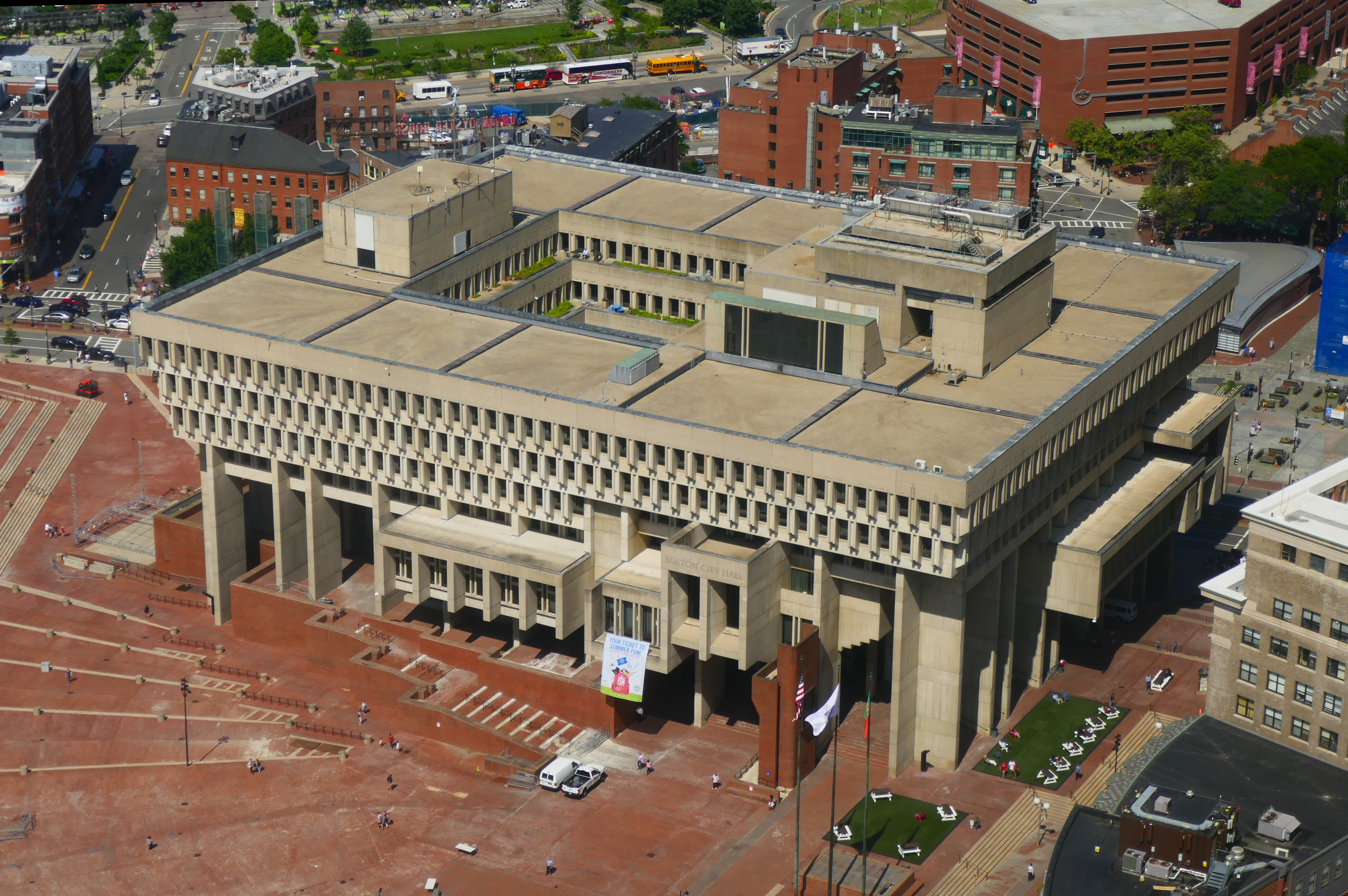
City Hall is sometimes described as emblematic of the brutalist style.

City Hall is sometimes described as emblematic of the brutalist style and of modern concrete architecture in general. One writer in 2009 said the building had been hailed as "one of the foremost examples of Modernist architecture", while another in 2023 called City Hall "the most powerful and recognizable emblem" of Brutalism. Brutalist historian Felix Torkar said in 2018 that the building had "established a whole new building archetype".

City Hall's design elevated the reputations of its architects, who went on to receive several commissions in Greater Boston. It also influenced other local architects, who built such concrete structures as the Countway Library, State Street Bank Building, and New England Aquarium. The presence of City Hall and the Kennedy Federal Building spurred further development around Government Center. The building influenced similarly-styled civic buildings in the United States and worldwide. Architecture critic Nathan Silver wrote that "half the towns in America got little Boston City Halls" during the 1960s and 1970s. These buildings, which included Dallas City Hall, were often constructed as part of redevelopment projects. Commercial buildings in Japan and Europe copied the design, along with structures as widely varied in function as banks, performance halls, and libraries.

The building has been detailed in a wide range of architectural media, including books. When the plans were unveiled in 1962, a scale model was shown at the Museum of Fine Arts, then at the Shawmut Bank's main office. The building also appeared in such exhibits as a 1980 modern-architecture showcase at the Institute of Contemporary Art. In 2009 a major exhibition of the original design drawings for City Hall was mounted at the Wentworth Institute of Technology. In 2019, a commemorative pin was produced for the building's 50th anniversary.

== Gallery ==
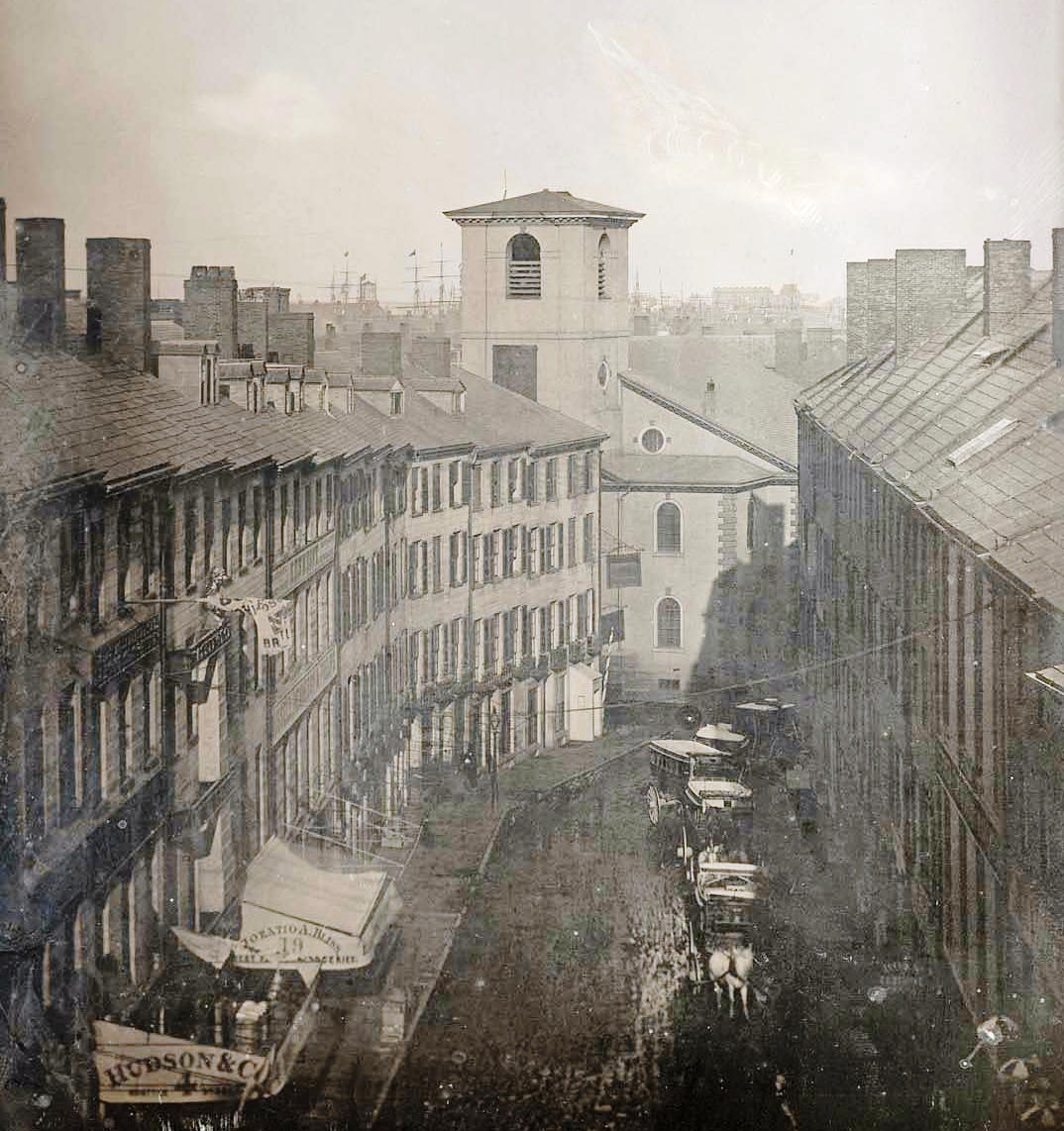
Brattle St., 1855 (future site of City Hall), taken by Southworth & Hawes

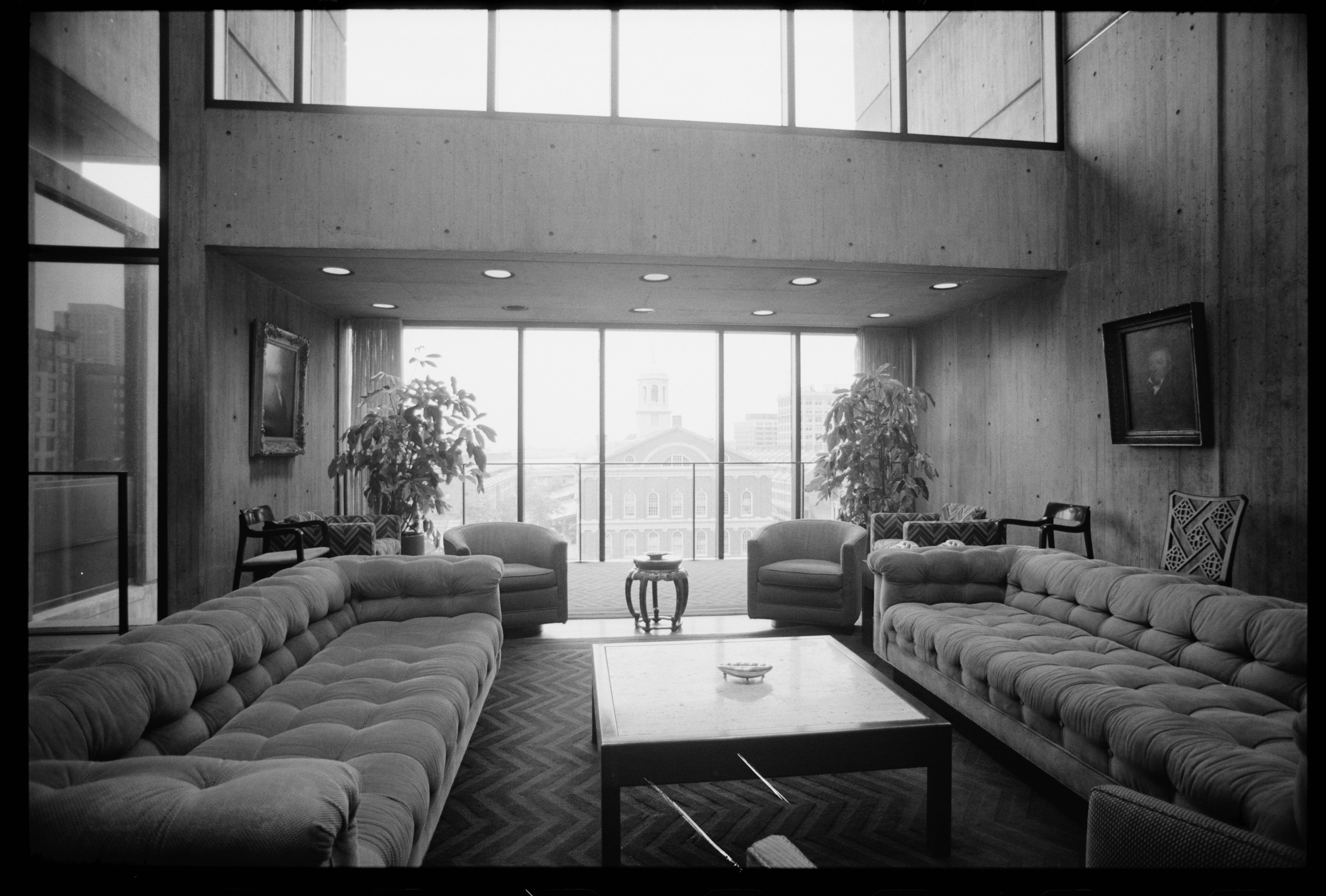
Interior, with view of Faneuil Hall through the window, 1981

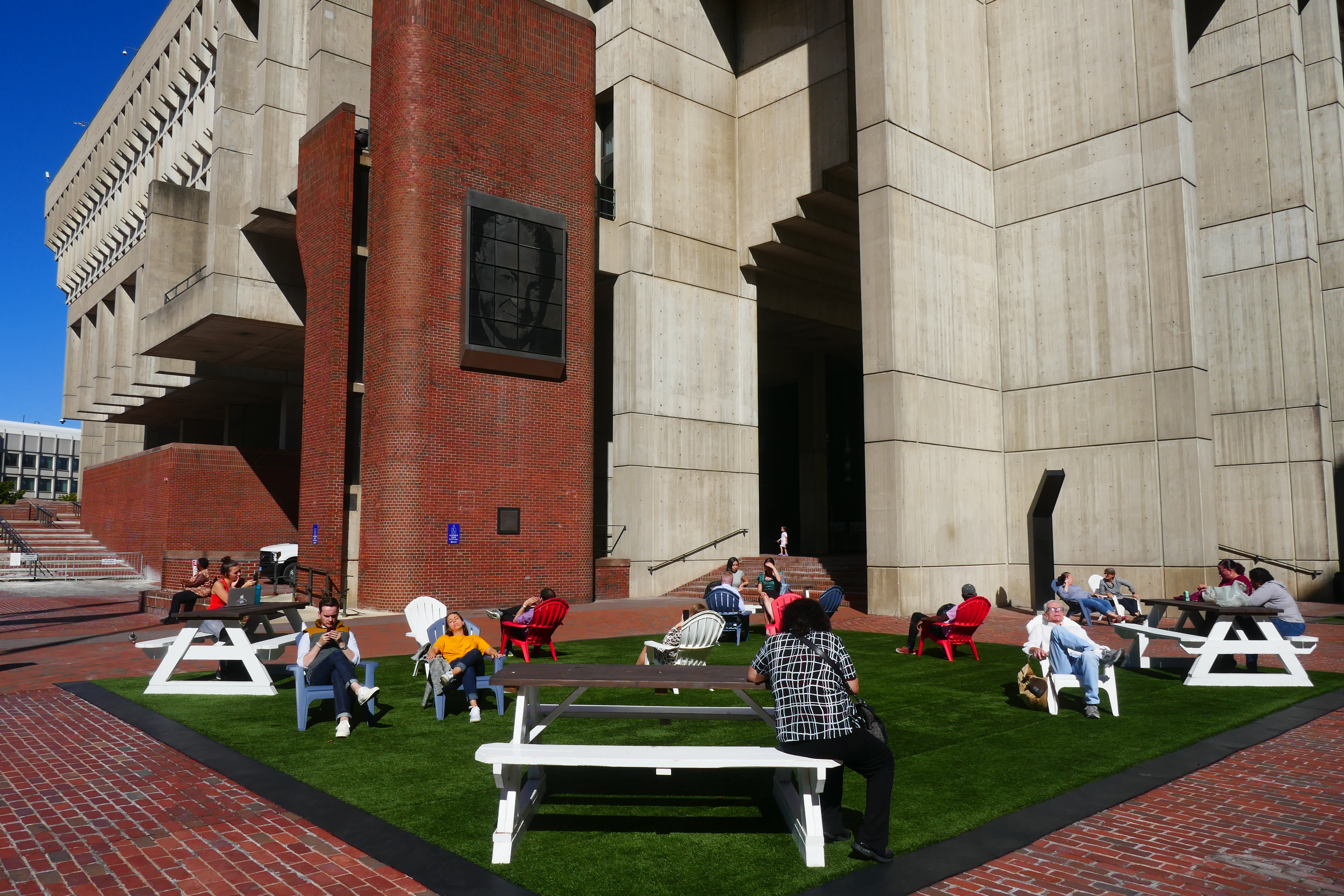
Public plaza

== See also ==
- City Hall – A film by Frederick Wiseman
- List of Boston Landmarks
- List of Brutalist architecture in the United States
- Palace of Culture (Messina) – A similar building

Site history

- Brattle Street (Boston) – Street in Boston, Massachusetts (1694–1962)
- Cornhill, Boston – Street in Boston, Massachusetts
