= Nathan Silver (architect) =

American architect (1936–2025)

- Born: 11 March 1936; New York City, U.S.
- Died: 19 May 2025 (aged 89); London, England
- Education: Cooper Union; Columbia University; University of Cambridge
- Occupations: Architecture critic Architect; Lecturer
- Spouse(s): Caroline Green (1961–1970); Helen McNeil-Ashton (1973–1980); Roxy Beaujolais(1994–2025)
- Children: 2

Nathan Silver (11 March 1936 – 19 May 2025) was a British-American architect and architecture critic. He is best known as the author of "Lost New York" (1967), which chronicled the loss of New York City's architectural heritage.

== Early life and education ==
Silver was born to Jewish parents, Isaac, an architect who also taught mechanical drawing at Stuyvesant High School and Libby Nachimowsky, a Hebrew school teacher, who later became a public school teacher. He was raised in Inwood, Manhattan and the Bronx.

Silver attended Stuyvesant High School and later earned a certificate in architecture at Cooper Union, and then studied at Columbia University, graduating with a bachelor's degree in architecture in 1955. In 1966 he completed a Masters at Cambridge University in England.

== Career ==
After graduating, Silver traveled in Europe on a fellowship, before starting to work at Kramer & Kramer architectural firm and with architect, Percival Goodman.

In 1961, Silver began teaching at Columbia University, where in 1964 he curated an exhibition about the city's lost built heritage. Silver felt compelled to mount the exhibition in the wake of the announcements that Pennsylvania Station would be demolished and that the Metropolitan Opera House on 39th Street would also be razed.

The exhibition expanded into Silver's eventual book project, "Lost New York", published in 1967. The book was a finalist for National Book Award for Nonfiction (History and Biography), and according to Silver, sold 100, 000 copies. He was also named a Guggenheim Fellow in 1968.

Prior to the book's release, Silver had moved permanently to England and began lecturing in architecture at Cambridge University in 1965. He was later the head of the architecture department at the University of East London, whilst also running how own architectural practice and was a partner in another.

In 1972, he co-authored "Adhocism: The Case for Improvisation" with Charles Jencks and later released "The Making of Beaubourg: A Building Biography of the Centre Pompidou Paris" in 1994.

He was also the regular architectural critic for The New Statesman magazine from 1967 to 1974. He also contributed to Metropolis, Architectural Forum, The Nation, Atlantic Monthly, The New York Times Book Review, Encounter, The Sunday Times Magazine, Harpers & Queen, The London Evening Standard and Blueprint.

== Personal life and death ==
Silver was married three times. He married Caroline Green, an English model and freelance journalist in 1961, before divorcing in 1970. In 1973 he married American academic, Helen McNeil-Ashton, daughter of abstract expressionist painter, George McNeil. They had two children together, a daughter, Liberty Silver, and a son, Gabriel Silver, before divorcing in 1980. His final marriage was to Adelaide-born Roxy Beaujolais, landlady of a 17th-century pub, whom he married in 1994. Silver died from complications of a fall on 19 May 2025, at the age of 89.
