= Moses Wight =

American painter

Moses Wight (1827–1895) was an artist in Boston, Massachusetts and Paris in the 19th century. He painted portraits of Edward Everett, Louis Agassiz, Charles Sumner, Alexander von Humboldt, and other notables.

== Biography ==
Wight "began the practice of art as a profession in 1845 ... devoting himself chiefly to portrait-painting." He kept a studio in Boston on Tremont Row, nearby several other artists -- Thomas Ball; W.M. Brackett; A. Clark; Thomas Edwards; J. Greenough; William H. Hanley; A.G. Hoit; Charles Hubbard; W. Hudson Jr.; D.C. Johnston; A.C. Morse; and Edward Seager. Around this time he painted works such as "Laying the Corner-Stone of the Beacon Hill Reservoir, Nov. 22, 1847" ("containing portraits of the mayor, Josiah Quincy Jr.; ex-mayors Josiah Quincy, Sr., and Samuel T. Armstrong; Nathan Hale, Thomas B. Curtis and James F. Baldwin, water commissioners; city marshal Francis Tukey, and members of the city council and government.")

Wight travelled to Europe in 1851, and studied with Antoine A.E. Hébert and Léon Bonnat in Paris. While in Berlin in 1852, Wight painted portraits of D.D. Barnard and Alexander von Humboldt. Edward Everett, also in Berlin at the time, facilitated the coveted Humboldt commission for Wight: "I reflect with pleasure that it was in my power, through the medium of my much valued friend Mr. D.D. Barnard, then our Minister at Berlin, to aid a meritorious young artist, Mr. M. Wight, in procuring an opportunity to paint the portrait of Baron Humboldt. This of course was a favor not likely to be asked of a person of such eminence, whose time was so precious, and whom so many artists were eager to paint and to model. Mr. Wight, however, succeeded so well in a portrait of Mr. Barnard, who enjoyed the intimacy of Baron Humboldt, that, on seeing it, he consented to give our young countryman four long sittings." By the artist's own account "when the portrait ... was completed, many persons, citizens and strangers, as well as artists, and among the latter Cornelius ... and Rauch, together with personal friends of Humboldt, came to see it. Before the portrait was sent to America, it was exhibited to the citizens in the grand hall of the Art Union of Berlin.

Back in Boston, he exhibited at the gallery of the New England Art Union in 1852; and the Boston Athenaeum in 1856. Around 1862 he kept a studio on Washington Street. "In the great fire of 1872 his studio was burned with many valuable canvases."

Through his career, other portrait subjects included: Louis Agassiz, Samuel Appleton, Daniel D. Barnard, Henry H. Childs, Thomas Dowse, Ralph Waldo Emerson, Edward Everett, Prof. Pierce, Josiah Quincy III, James Savage, Charles Sumner, Alexander von Humboldt, Emory Washburn, and Henry Wilson.

He received good press. Of his portrait of Everett, one reviewer praised: "the position is easy, graceful, and natural; the expression faithful and spirited; the face and figure show Mr. Everett as he now is. Mr. Wight is undoubtedly a painter of great ability, and this portrait alone, would gain him a very high reputation."

He also had his critics, however. For instance, in 1879 "the life-size picture of 'Eve at the Fountain,' painted by Mr. Wight, now on exhibition at Childs & Co.'s gallery, is an attempt at a great work in art, but we can hardly regard it as a successful one. With all the adventitious aids given to it in the drapery about it, and the arrangement of the light, which must greatly heighten its effect, the picture seems to us to come far short of what it ought to be. We doubt whether Eve could be represented except in marble to satisfy our ideal of the innocence, purity and dignity that ought to belong to the fair mother of the race."

Moving permanently to Paris, around 1890 he lived on the Boulevard Rochechouart. In 1886 Wight married Leonide Labat (b. 1831). He died in 1895.

== Image gallery ==
Selected works by Wight

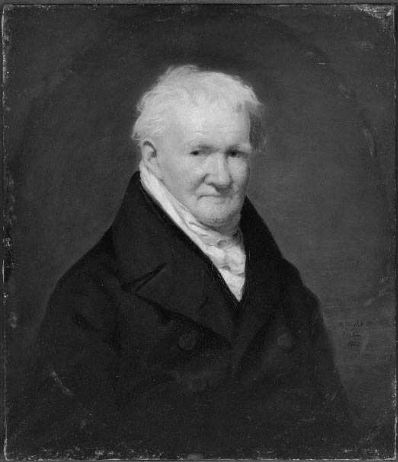
Portrait of Alexander von Humboldt, 1852 (Museum of Fine Arts, Boston)

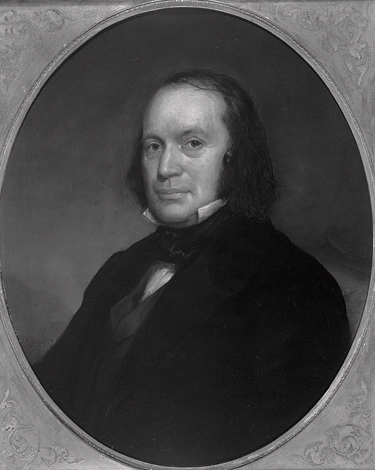
Louis Agassiz, 1855 (Harvard University)

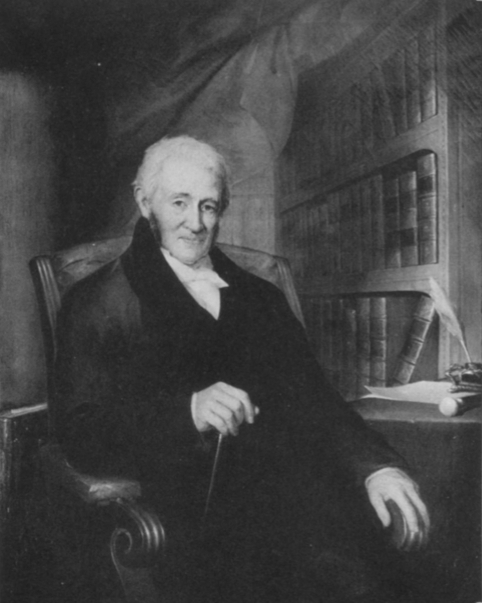
Thomas Dowse, 1856

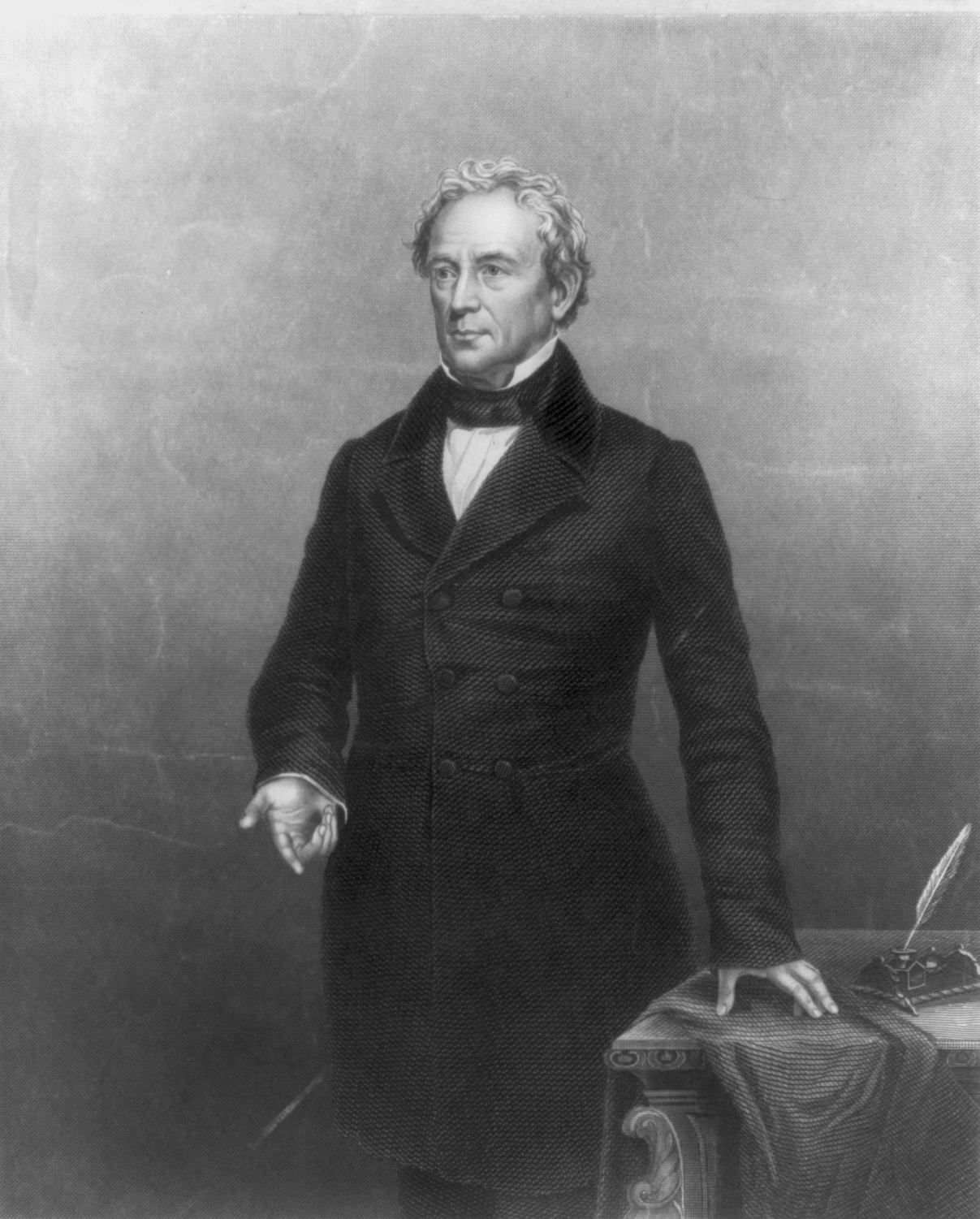
Edward Everett; engraving by D.J. Pound, after painting by Wight, ca.1859

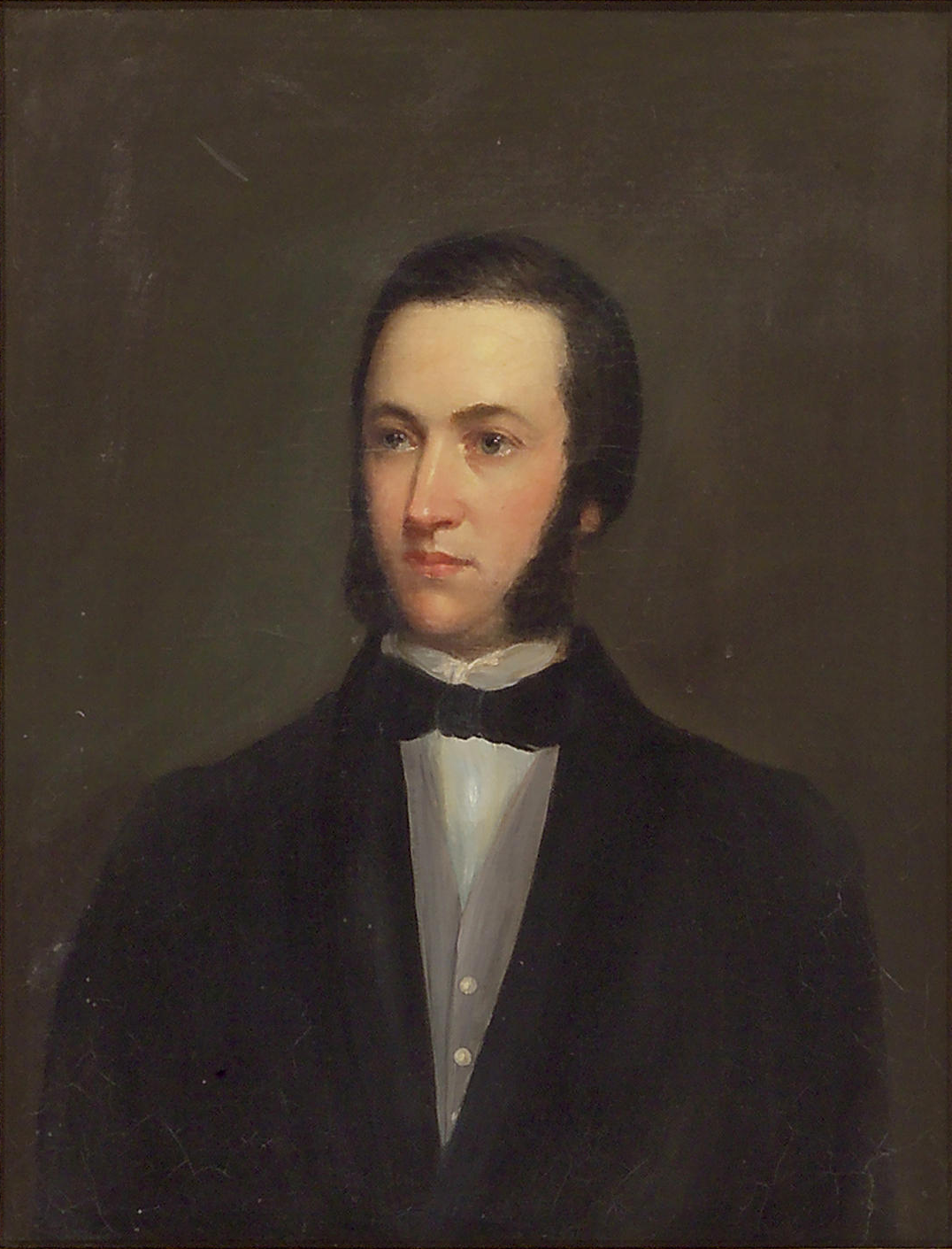
Unidentified man, 1861

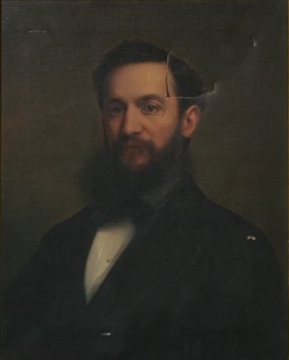
Unidentified man, 1872
