= Boston Monthly Magazine =

Historic magazine

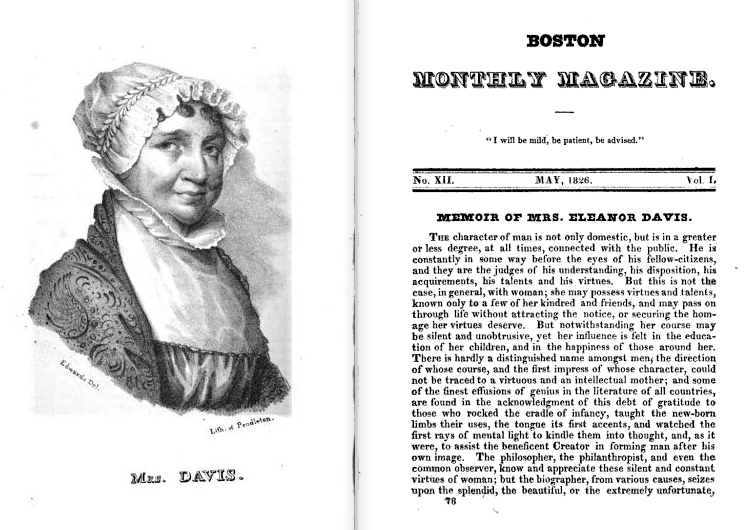
Boston Monthly Magazine, May 1826; with detail of "Memoir of Mrs. Eleanor Davis"

The Boston Monthly Magazine (1825–1826) of Boston, Massachusetts, was edited by Samuel Lorenzo Knapp in the 1820s. It was "devoted to literature, philosophy, and miscellaneous matters, worthy of being recorded, ... [and] chiefly directed to the diffusion of the productions of our own minds." It focused on American culture, as distinct from that of Europe. Contributors included Thomas Edwards, David Claypoole Johnston, Pendleton's Lithography, John Ritto Penniman, and William Hoogland.

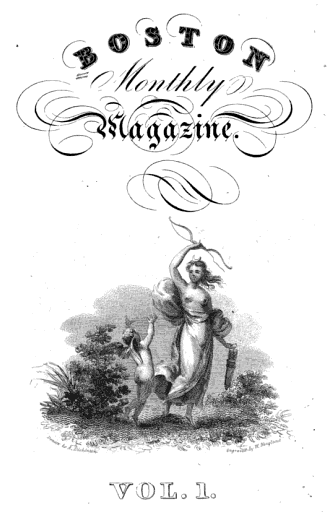
Boston Monthly Magazine, frontispiece for v.1, 1825

In the first issue of June 1825, Knapp addressed his readers:

We shall endeavor to blend amusement with instruction, and philosophy and taste with morals — to persuade without dictating, and to reason without any claims to infallibility. ... We shall not confine ourselves to any particular field of literature or philosophy; but shall thrust in our sickles wherever we have a right to reap, and glean after others wherever the harvest is gathered, if what is left is worth picking up. We shall give to our labors as much variety as possible, and often attempt to relieve the solemn legend and serious tale, by something of the playful and the gay. The wits shall be taxed to swell our stores, but nothing shall appear in our columns to confuse innocence or alarm modesty. We shall often leave the groves of fancy and the paths of general literature and history, for deep shades and solitudes, where repose the ashes of youth and loveliness, to drop a tear and strew a flower on the graves of those untimely called away; ... to read the rude memorials of our forefathers, in order to bring their merits into light, and make them better known to their descendants. ... Among the fair we expect readers and hope for patrons, for we have at all times advocated their claims to an equal share with men, in the advancement of knowledge and happiness in society, and shall still continue to support the same doctrine. The time has gone when females were pleased with drivelling flattery, and smiled in approbation at mawkish sonnets to their beauty and charms. ... The simplicity of Sparta and the polish of Athens, is sweetly blended in the highest state of female education. ... In the course of our labors, we shall not be unmindful of the numerous institutions and societies now flourishing in our country; — their origin, growth, and value, shall be fairly discussed. A monthly summary of passing events at home, and a succinct view of things abroad, shall be added. If we glance at politics, it shall be with national feelings; if we touch upon religion, it shall be in the spirit of toleration.
