= Thomas Edwards (artist) =

American portrait painter (1795–1869)

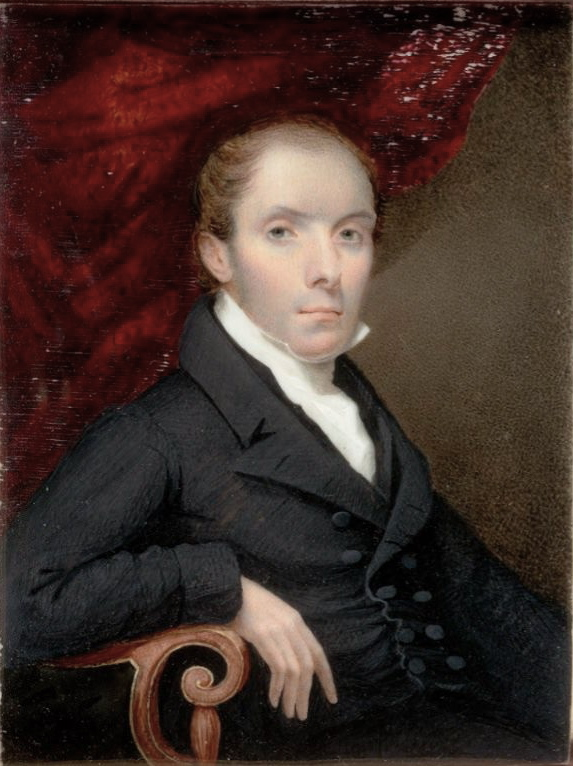
Self-portrait by Thomas Edwards, 19th century (Museum of Fine Arts, Boston)

Thomas Edwards (1795–1869) was an artist in 19th-century Boston, Massachusetts, specializing in portraits. Born in London and trained at the Royal Academy, he worked in Boston in the 1820s-1850s, and in Worcester in the 1860s.

== Biography ==
Edwards kept a studio in Boston on Winter Street, then on Market Street/Cornhill, Tremont Street (Tremont Temple), and Tremont Row. In the mid-1850s he may have travelled in Italy and elsewhere in Europe, producing drawings of landscapes and the like.

He "was a frequent exhibitor in the early years of the Boston Athenaeum." He also exhibited with the Massachusetts Charitable Mechanic Association in 1847 ("...Two landscapes. Rather heavy in style"); and with the New England Art Union in 1851 and 1852. In 1855 he exhibited at No.43 Tremont Row, Boston, "a collection of about 75 landscapes and other original compositions ... all finished by him during the last few years. The subjects are chiefly views of American scenery, mostly in New England, a few views in the Western states, White Mountains, and other interesting local scenes, all painted from sketches taken on the spot."

Edwards was among the first wave of artists creating drawings intended for lithographic printing. In Boston he drew for Pendleton's Lithography in the 1820s. Other early lithographic artists in Boston included Francis Alexander, D.C. Johnston, William Hoogland, and J.R. Penniman. Edwards also drew for Annin, Smith and Co's Lithography, and "the Senefelder Lithographic Co. in 1830, along with artists Hazen Morse and John Chorley." Prints historian Frank Weitenkampf writes "Thomas Edwards, of Boston, was one of the first to draw in the crayon manner, and in portraits such as the one of James Tilton, M.D., the hesitation, the want of familiarity with the new medium is quite apparent. His Jacob Perkins (1826, printed by Pendleton) is already more free in execution." In the late 1820s he contributed to the plate illustrations that appeared occasionally in the Boston-based weekly Bower of Taste.

Often painted in miniature, or drawn to be printed lithographically, portrait subjects included:

- Edward Beecher
- Samuel A. Bumstead
- Alonzo Chapin
- Mary Ann T Chapin
- R.M. Copeland
- Eleanor Davis
- Brown Emerson
- John Foster
- Samuel Green
- Franklin Haven
- Jedidiah Morse
- Nathan Parker
- Jacob Perkins, inventor
- Stephen Salisbury
- James Tilton, physician
- John Webster
- Samuel Porter Williams

Edwards' friends and associates included Thomas Robbins. "James Kidder [1793-1837] and Thomas Edwards shared a studio in Boston in 1831." Students included E.M. Carpenter.

He died in Charlestown, Massachusetts in 1869.

== Images ==
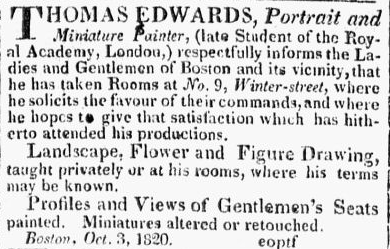
Newspaper advertisement for Edwards, Winter Street, Boston, 1820

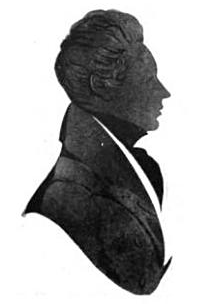
Silhouette portrait of an unidentified man, c. 1824

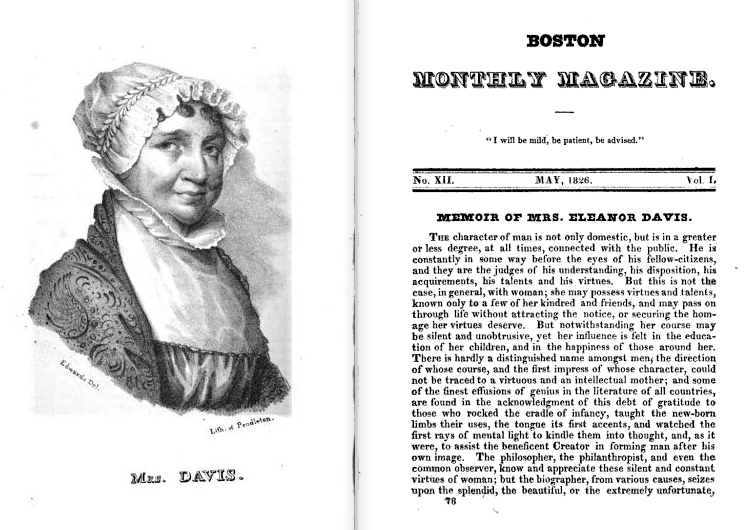
Portrait of Eleanor Davis, in Boston Monthly Magazine, 1826

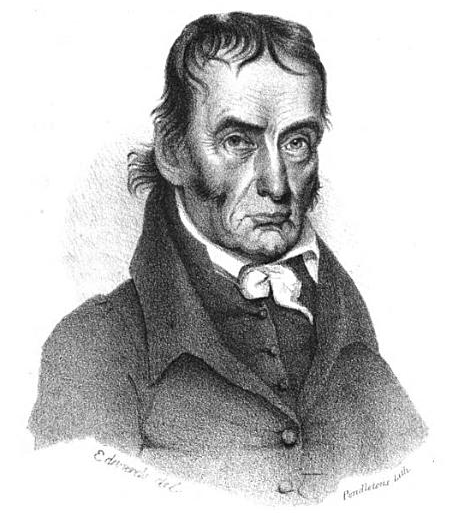
Portrait of James Tilton, in Thacher's American Medical Biography, 1828

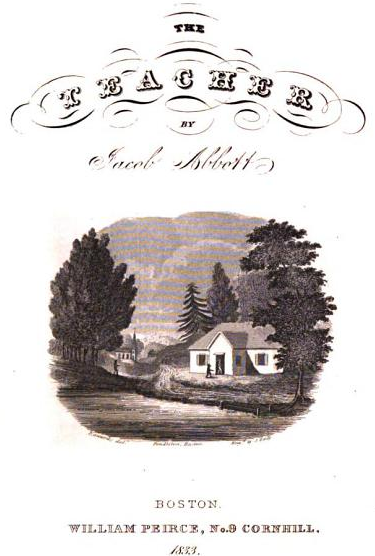
Frontispiece to Jacob Abbott's The Teacher, 1834
