= New England Art Union =

The New England Art Union (c. 1848 – 1852) was established in Boston, Massachusetts, for "the encouragement of artists, the promotion of art" in New England and the wider United States. Edward Everett, Franklin Dexter, and Henry Wadsworth Longfellow served as officers of the board. The short-lived but lively union ran a public gallery on Tremont Street, and published a journal. Artists affiliated with the union included Chester Harding, Fitz Henry Lane, Alvan Fisher, and other American artists of the mid-19th century.

== History ==
The union was organized around 1848, and incorporated in Massachusetts in 1850. The board included Everett, Dexter, and Longfellow, and a mix of prominent Bostonian businessmen, artists, and other notables: Joseph Andrews; Thomas G. Appleton; Edward C. Cabot; Alvan Fisher; Nathaniel Langdon Frothingham; James B. Gregerson; Chester Harding; Joshua H. Hayward; George S. Hilliard; Albert G. Hoit; Jonathan Mason; Benjamin S. Rotch; G. G. Smith; Charles Sumner; C. G. Thompson; and Ammi B. Young. Others associated with union administration included James Lawrence and Thomas T. Spear.

The union aimed to promote excellence in art, to single out top performing American artists, and to educate the public eye. To this end, the board thought of increasing the breadth of distributed art in circulation amongst the American public by producing fine art prints. In particular, in 1851 the union offered to its subscribers a copy of an engraving by C.E. Wagstaff and Joseph Andrews of Washington Allston's painting "Saul and the Witch of Endor." The original painting (owned by Thomas Handasyd Perkins) was also exhibited in the union's gallery.

The board considered their purpose as part of a national effort to raise the quality of American visual art, ideally on par with the greats of Europe and the ancient world. "In empires and monarchies every protection is afforded to institutions of arts. Regarded as the harbingers of refinement, and the heralds of prosperity, they diffuse a radiance around thrones, and a lustre on the rulers that cherish them. In our republican land, genius cannot receive this munificent patronage, but, by the establishment of art unions, the sovereign people can stimulate and educe merit under the combined influence of those urgent springs of action -- emulation and recompense. The divines, statesmen, soldiers and writers of New England, fostered by public applause and patronage, have given high proof of their merit, and we regard the Art Union as destined to elevate the character of our artists. Its fostering patronage will prove that, by affording adequate opportunity, New England is as congenial to the arts of design, as the lands which have produced a Michael Angelo, a Praxiteles, a Wilkie, or the Vernsets (i.e. Claude Joseph Vernet, Carle Vernet, Horace Vernet)."

In the mid-19th century, a number of art unions were organized in the U.S., some more respectable than others. The New England Art Union enjoyed a solid reputation. As one observer commented:

"If I have of late been more solicitous for the N.E. Art-Union, it is because it is new, and because I know that the men who direct it are gentlemen, in the true sense of the word; and am fully confident that they will not domineer, and dictate, and calumniate, and make false pretences about the value of their prints and paintings, and puff the servile daubers who submit to them, and declare that the country produces no better works than theirs, and that all who are not their loyal subjects are of no account at tall, and that they have 'declined' their works. Such a line of argument, affecting to despise their opponents, yet covertly stinging them with envenomed sneers and lies -- such blackguardism the Managers of the New England Art Union cannot possibly commit, because they are gentlemen. Edward Everett, Henry W. Longfellow, Franklin Dexter; has anybody heard of them? does anybody want a better guarantee?"

=== Gallery ===
Around 1850, local directories and art publications reported that "the gallery of the institution, no.38 Tremont Row, Boston, is open to the public" and "their collection already embraces a number of meritorious works." Visitors to the gallery included Adin Augustus Ballou (son of Socialist Adin Ballou).

The gallery exhibited works by: Joseph Ames, William Babcock, Thomas Ball, Charles A. Barry, Albert Fitch Bellows, A. Bierstadt, William T. Carlton, Benjamin Champney, J.A. Codman, C.P. Cranch, Mrs. H. Dassell, Thomas Edwards, Alvan Fisher, W.A. Gay, Samuel L. Gerry, George H. Hall, W.H. Hanley, Albert Gallatin Hoit, H.P. Hunt, D.C. Johnston, J.F. Kensett, John A. Knight, Kurtz, Fitz Henry Lane, W. Morrison, B.F. Nutting, Mrs. Oakes, John Pope, A. Ransom, John W. A. Scott, Thomas T. Spear, P. Stephenson, H.G. Wilde, and Moses Wight. Some of the artists affiliated with the union kept studios in Boston's Tremont Temple, which burned in 1852. Fellow artists took up a collection on behalf of those afflicted by the fire.

=== Journal ===
In 1852 the union issued its Bulletin, "embellished with a well executed sketch of the engraving [of Washington Allston's painting of Saul and the Witch of Endor], and a woodcut, spiritedly designed by Hammatt Billings, in illustration of Mr. Longfellow's ballad, 'The Skeleton in Armor.'"

== Images ==
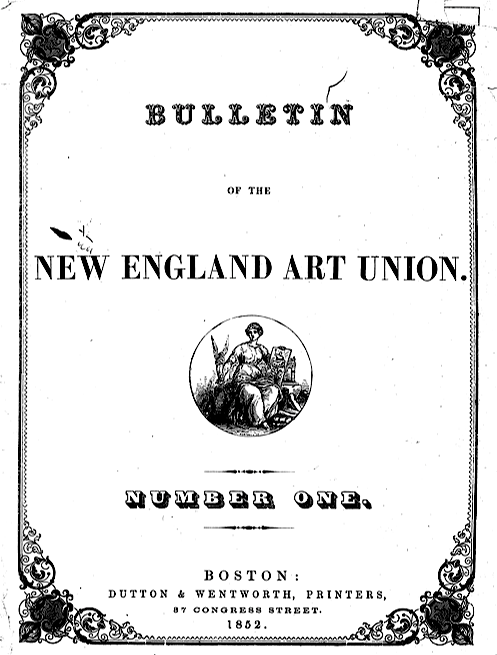
Cover of Bulletin, 1852

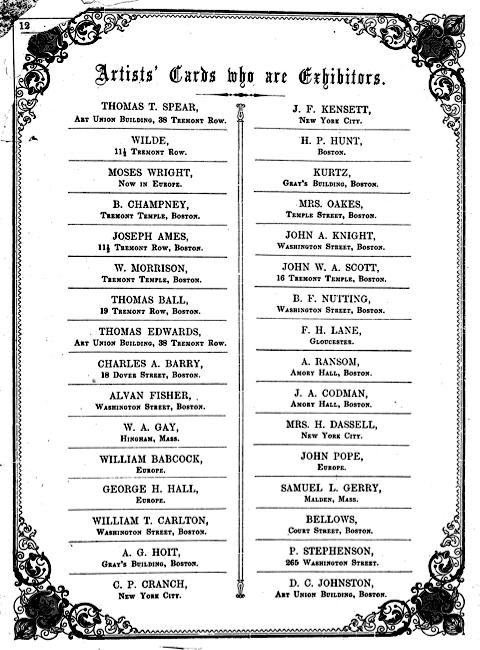
Artists exhibiting in the Art Union gallery, 1852

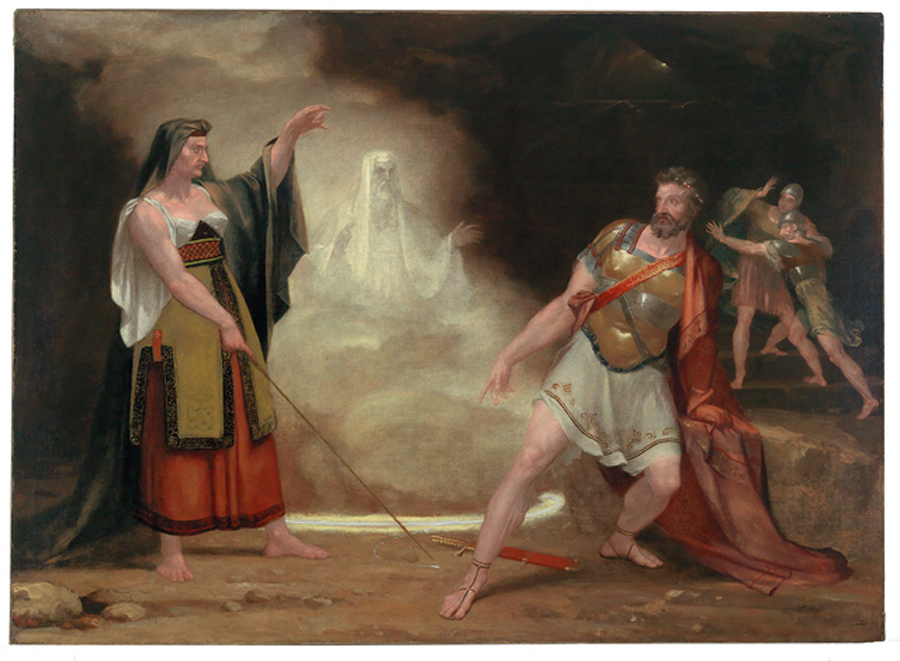
Washington Allston's "Saul and the Witch of Endor," 1820, exhibited at the Art Union gallery

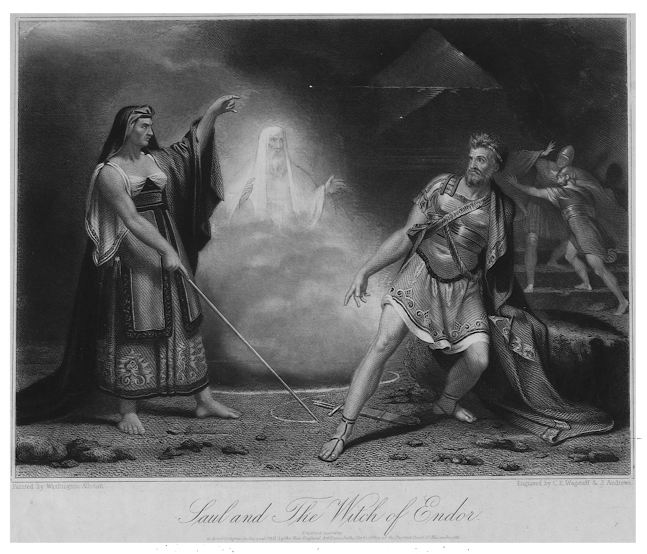
Engraving of Allston's "Saul and the Witch of Endor"

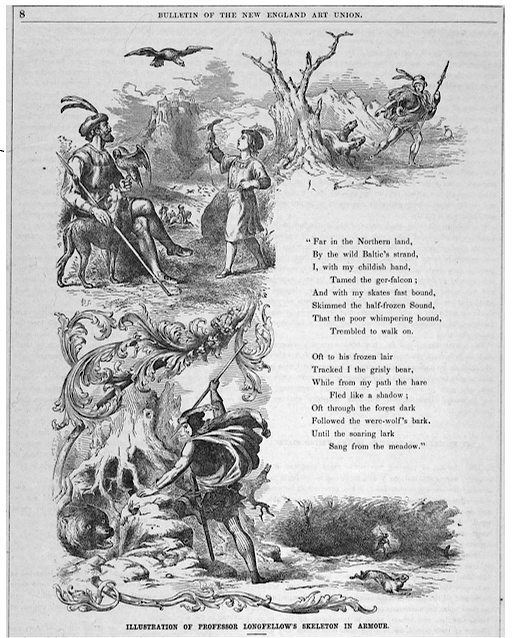
Illustration in the 1852 Bulletin of stanzas from Longfellow's "Skeleton in Armor"
