= John Samuel Blunt =

American-born ornamental painter and craftsman

John Samuel Blunt (March 17, 1798 – August 1835) was an American-born ornamental painter, calligrapher and craftsman. Blunt is best known for his seascapes and work in portraiture. Prior to the 21st century, Blunt has been identified as the “Borden Limner”, a name coined by art historian Robert Bishop and given to Blunt for his famed portraits of sea captain Daniel Borden and his wife. Blunt's work with landscape predates that of The Hudson River School movement by nearly a decade. He has been the highlight of recent art historical discussion following the unearthing of two sketchbooks and an account ledger.

== Early life and education ==
John Samuel Blunt was born on March 17, 1798, in Portsmouth, New Hampshire to Mark Samuel Blunt (1770–1815) and Mary Sarah Drowne (1776–1829). Blunt was one of six children, three of whom died in early childhood. Descended from the Blunt's of Andover Massachusetts, John bore a strong family lineage of mariners and craftsmen. Blunt's father was lieutenant of the privateer “Portsmouth” and was lost at sea when the ship sank off the coast of Portugal in 1815. Blunt's paternal grandfather, Captain John Blunt, was a sea captain, notable for manning the helm of George Washington's ship on his famed crossing of the Delaware in 1776. Blunt's maternal grandfather, Shem Drowne (1683–1774), was a Rhode Island coppersmith attributed with making the grasshopper vane atop Faneuil Hall in Boston.

Blunt's early years were marked by a series of tragedies that struck the seacoast town of Portsmouth. A sequence of fires in 1802, 1806 and 1813 left the town in a constant state of restructuring. Among the casualties of the fire of 1813 was Blunt's childhood home on State Street. The devastation from the fires placed economic strain upon not only the town of Portsmouth, but the Blunt family as well. Amidst the backdrop of these fires was the ongoing conflict of The War of 1812.As a coastal city and major port, Portsmouth was constantly engaged in defensive measures throughout the conflict. Blunt began attending school at the Old Brick Schoolhouse several doors down the street from his family home. School master Eleazor Taft, oversaw his studies of reading, writing and mathematics. In 1815, following peace with England and his father's death at sea, John, the oldest of his three surviving siblings, was left to support his mother financially. A year after his fathers death he began an apprenticeship in the Boston workshop of master craftsman and clock-maker John Ritto Penniman (born Milford Massachusetts, 1782–1841). Among his peers at Penniman's workshop were William P. Codman and Nathan Negus.

== Influences and early career ==
In 1821, upon completion of his apprenticeship with Penniman, Blunt sailed up the Merrimack river (alongside fellow painter William P.Codman) and returned to Portsmouth. That same year, prior to his return from Boston, he married Newburyport Massachusetts-born Esther P. Colby (1801–1872). The two would go on to have six children together, welcoming their first-born Francis Mary Blunt (b. 1821-d.1872) several months after their marriage. Upon his return to Portsmouth he purchased studio space in “March's Building” on Daniel Street (named after his landlord Nathaniel March). Several years later he purchased a lot on Pleasant Street. In 1831 he moved his studio to Boston, where he remained a resident until his death in August 1835.

== Death ==
Blunt died of Yellow Fever aboard the ship “The Ohio” on a return trip from Texas to Boston in 1835. The thirty-seven year old artist had recently acquired a plot of land in Texas and planned on moving his family westward when he was struck ill and died.

== Notable works ==
- “Frances Motley”, 1830-1833. Oil on canvas. Worcester Art Museum, Worcester, MA: https://worcester.emuseum.com/objects/50576/frances-motley?ctx=3cb7dc7ab8266efd98758162c9881cc723337c8e&idx=15
- “An Unidentified Lady Wearing a Green Dress with Jewelry”, 1831. Oil on canvas. Worcester Art Museum, Worcester, MA: https://worcester.emuseum.com/objects/45208/an-unidentified-lady-wearing-a-green-dress-with-jewelry?ctx=fb88ae3825ca93d2186a8cbf43924eb09782d3c2&idx=2
- “House on a River”, n.d.Oil on canvas. 17x21 in. Private Collection.
