= Tremont Row =

Street in Boston, Massachusetts

Coordinates: 42°21′37.32″N 71°3′39.32″W

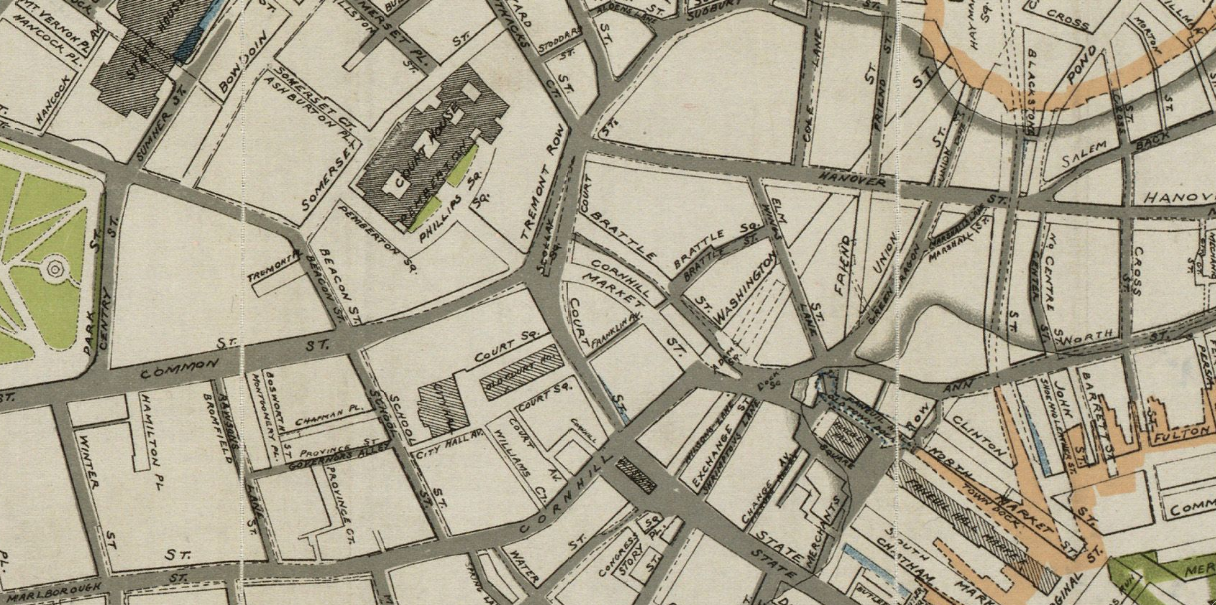
Detail of map of Boston in 1895, showing Tremont Row

Tremont Row (1830s–1920s) in Boston, Massachusetts, was a short street that flourished in the 19th and early-20th centuries. It was located near the intersection of Court, Tremont, and Cambridge streets, in today's Government Center area. It existed until the 1920s, when it became known as Scollay Square. In 1859 the Barre Gazette newspaper described Tremont Row as "the great Dry Goods Street of Boston."

== Tenants ==
Anthony Feola Photographer

- Thomas Gold Appleton
- Austin and Stone's Dime Museum
- Thomas Ball, sculptor
- Hammatt Billings, architect
- Boston Artists' Association
- Comstock & Ross
- Cutting & Turner, photographers
- John J.P. Davis, daguerreotype artist
- Dobson & Schumann, photographers
- R.A. Dobson, photographer
- John Doggett & Co.
- Thomas Edwards (artist)
- Marguerite F. Foley, "cameo cutter"
- E.J. Foss, photographer
- Miss Addie M. Gendron, photographer
- Frederick Gleason, publisher
- Mr. Gray, portrait artist
- Harris & Stanwood, silver
- Haven, Pierce & Co., shoes
- Josiah Johnson Hawes, photographer
- Heard & Moseley
- John B. Heywood
- Albert Gallatin Hoit
- Charles Hubbard (artist)
- William Hudson Jr., artist
- F.A. Jones & Co. "Great Silk and Shawl House"
- Joseph Leonard, auctioneer; Leonard & Cunningham
- Leonard & Pierce
- G.H. Loomis, photographer
- Mayer's Confectionary
- Mechanic Apprentices Library Association
- Naismith Photographer
- New England Art Union
- William H. Oakes
- Alfred Ordway
- Pavilion Hotel
- George P. Reed, publisher
- Scollay Theatre
- Sharp & Michelin lithographers
- Southworth & Hawes, photographers
- I.A. Wetherbee
- Merrill G. Wheelock
- Moses Wight, artist

new york dental parlors

== Images ==
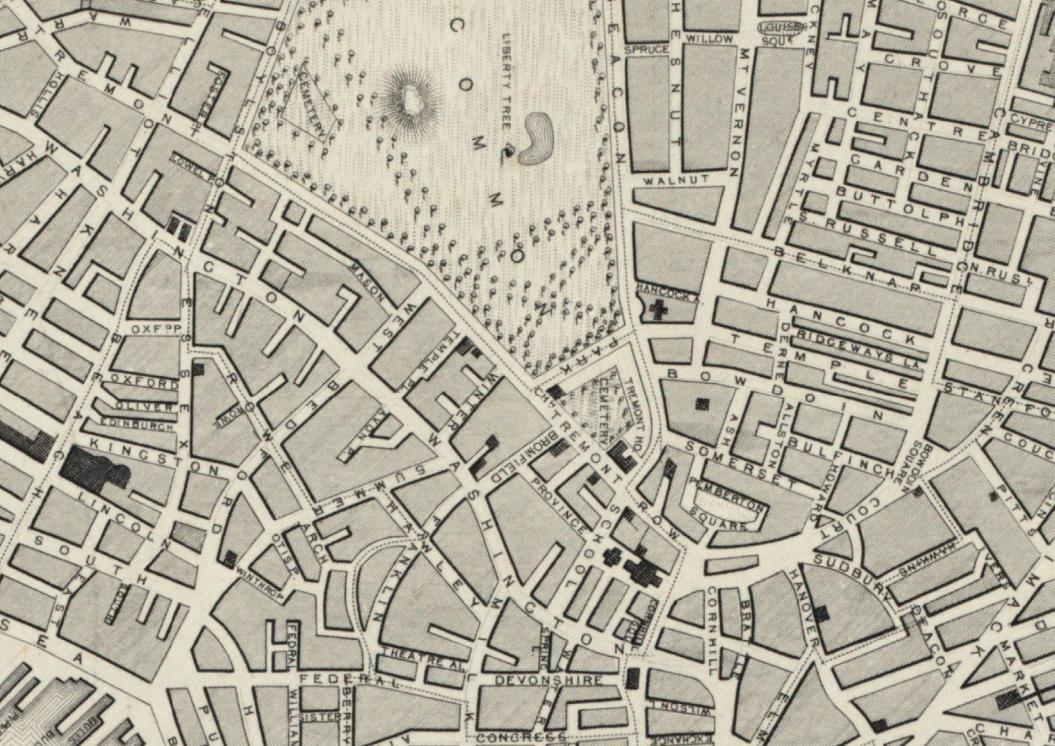
Detail of map of Boston in 1838, showing Tremont Row.

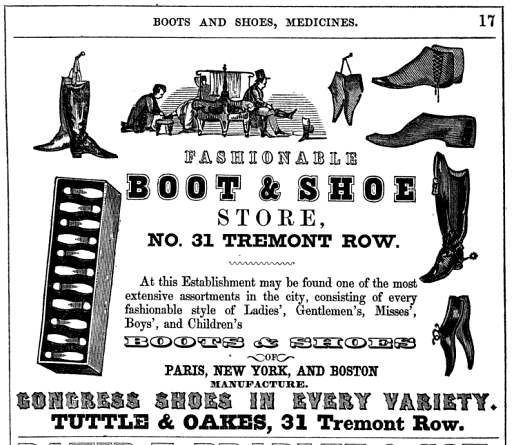
Advertisement for Tuttle & Oakes boots and shoes, 1848

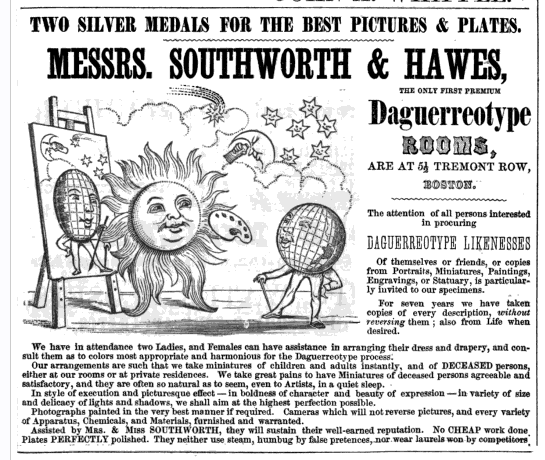
Advertisement for Southworth & Hawes, daguerreotypists, 1848

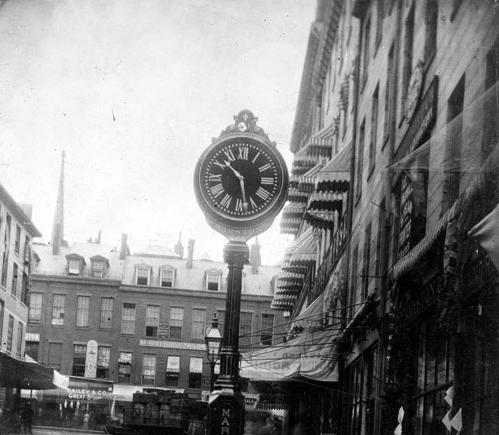
Brattle Street, looking up towards Tremont Row, c. 1860s (Bostonian Society)

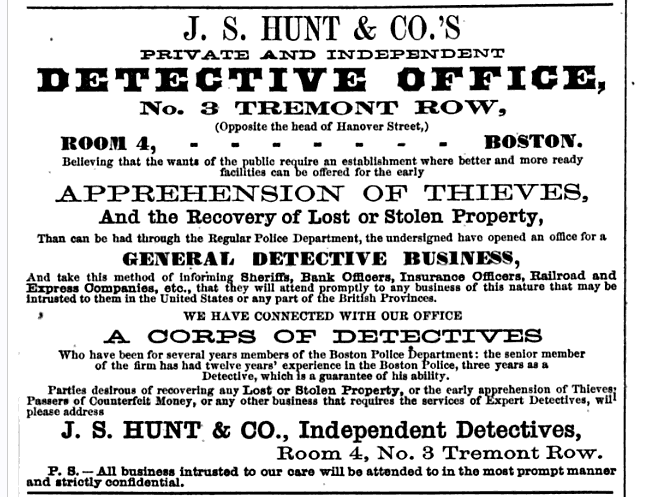
Advertisement for J.S. Hunt & Co. detective office, 1868

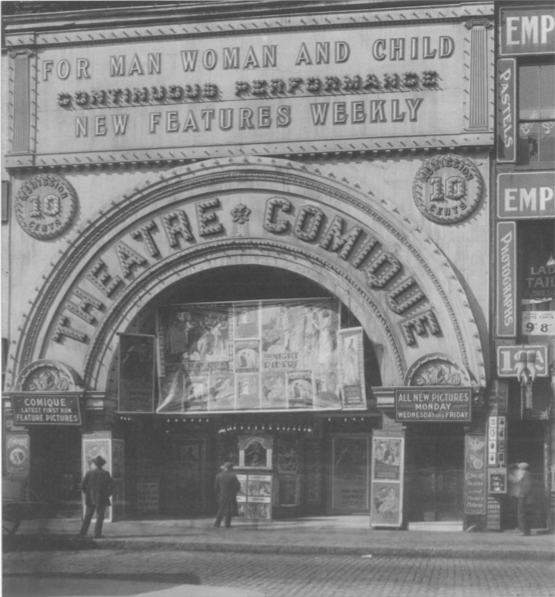
Theatre Comique, Tremont Row, Boston, c. 1916

== See also ==
- Scollay Square
