= Wellman Morrison =

American painter

Wellman Morrison (1815-1857) was an artist in Boston, Massachusetts, in the mid-19th century. He painted landscapes and portraits; subjects included Charles Sumner. "He exhibited at the Boston Athenaeum in 1846, 1847, and 1856." Around 1852 he kept a studio in Boston's Tremont Temple.
