= John Crookshanks King =

American sculptor

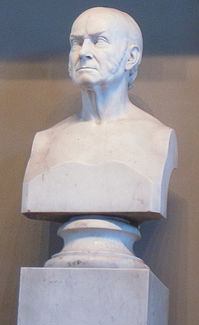
Portrait of J.Q. Adams by J.C. King, 1861; located in Faneuil Hall, Boston

John Crookshanks King (1806–1882) was a Scotland-born sculptor in Boston, Massachusetts, in the 19th century. He created portraits of John Quincy Adams, Louis Agassiz, Robert Burns, Ralph Waldo Emerson, Horace Greeley, Walter Scott, Daniel Webster, Samuel B. Woodward and others. Around 1852 he kept a studio in Boston's Tremont Temple.
