= Grove Hinman Loomis =

American photographer

Grove Hinman Loomis or G.H. Loomis (1823–1898) was a photographer in Boston, Massachusetts, in the mid-19th century. He also worked as a real estate broker, teacher and government employee. He died in Newton, Massachusetts in 1898.

== Images ==
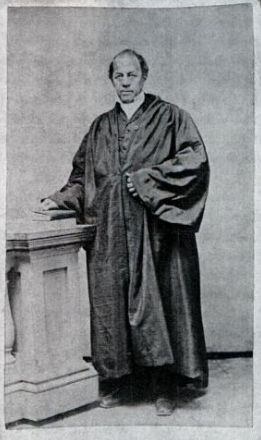
Portrait of Leonard Grimes by G.H. Loomis (New Bedford Historical Society)

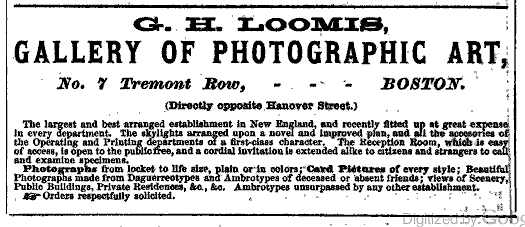
Advertisement for Loomis' Gallery of Photographic Art, Tremont Row, Boston, 1868

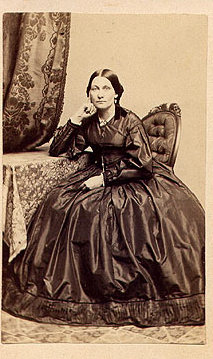
Portrait of a woman by G.H. Loomis

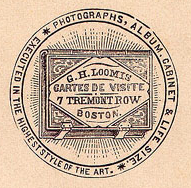
Logo of "G.H. Loomis, cartes de visite," Boston
