= Thomas Thompson (businessman) =

American businessman and art collector

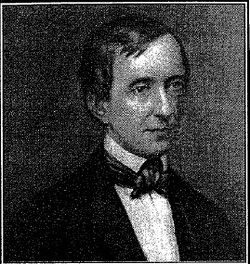
- Thomas Thompson, by unknown artist.
- Born: c. 1797; Boston
- Died: 1869 (aged 71–72); New York City
- Occupations: Businessman art collector
- Spouse: Elizabeth Rowell Thompson

Thomas Thompson (c. 1797 – 1869) was an American businessman and art collector, who also set up one of the oldest charitable foundations in the United States.

== Background ==
Thomas Thompson was born in about 1797 in Boston, Massachusetts.

MThompsons father, who was also named Thomas Thompson, originally came from Nantucket and was of a quaker family. The family was wealthy. In a Boston pamphlet published in 1846 entitled Our First Men, which lists the names of the most prominent and wealthiest people of the city, one can find the Thompson family.

Thompson was sent to Harvard University in 1817, and was the classmate of George Barrell Emerson, Caleb Cushing, and George Bancroft. He was an honors student, and already from a young age interested in art and nature.

== Art collection ==
Thompson started collecting art early, and the first inventory of his collection is dated 1844. Unfortunately, most of his art collection was stored at the Tremont Temple in Boston, which was divested in a fire in March 1852. Thompson writes on April 5, 1852, to the secretary of the city's Board of Engineers;

At your request I transmit a statement of my loss by the late fire in the Tremont Temple. I have been twenty years making the collection recently deposited there. My estimate of the loss – that is, the lowest cost – $92,456 on the pictures, although I do not think that they could be replaced to-morrow for a hundred and fifty thousand.

However, Thompson almost immediately started building up a new collection, and it was said that his aim was to gift his collection to the city of Boston. However, Thompson moved from Boston to New York, and the gift to Boston was never materialized. Instead, the collection was sold of after his death at an auction witch started in New York on February 7, 1870. The sale was organized by his estate, and conducted by Thompson's brother-in-law, George Presbury Rowell, who also served as the estate executor to his sister, Thompson's widow, Elizabeth Rowell Thompson.

All lots in the sale was marked on the back with:

Thompson Collection / New York – 1870 / Geo. P. Rowell.

=== Gallery ===
These pictures was among them sold from Mr. Thompsons collection in New York in 1870.

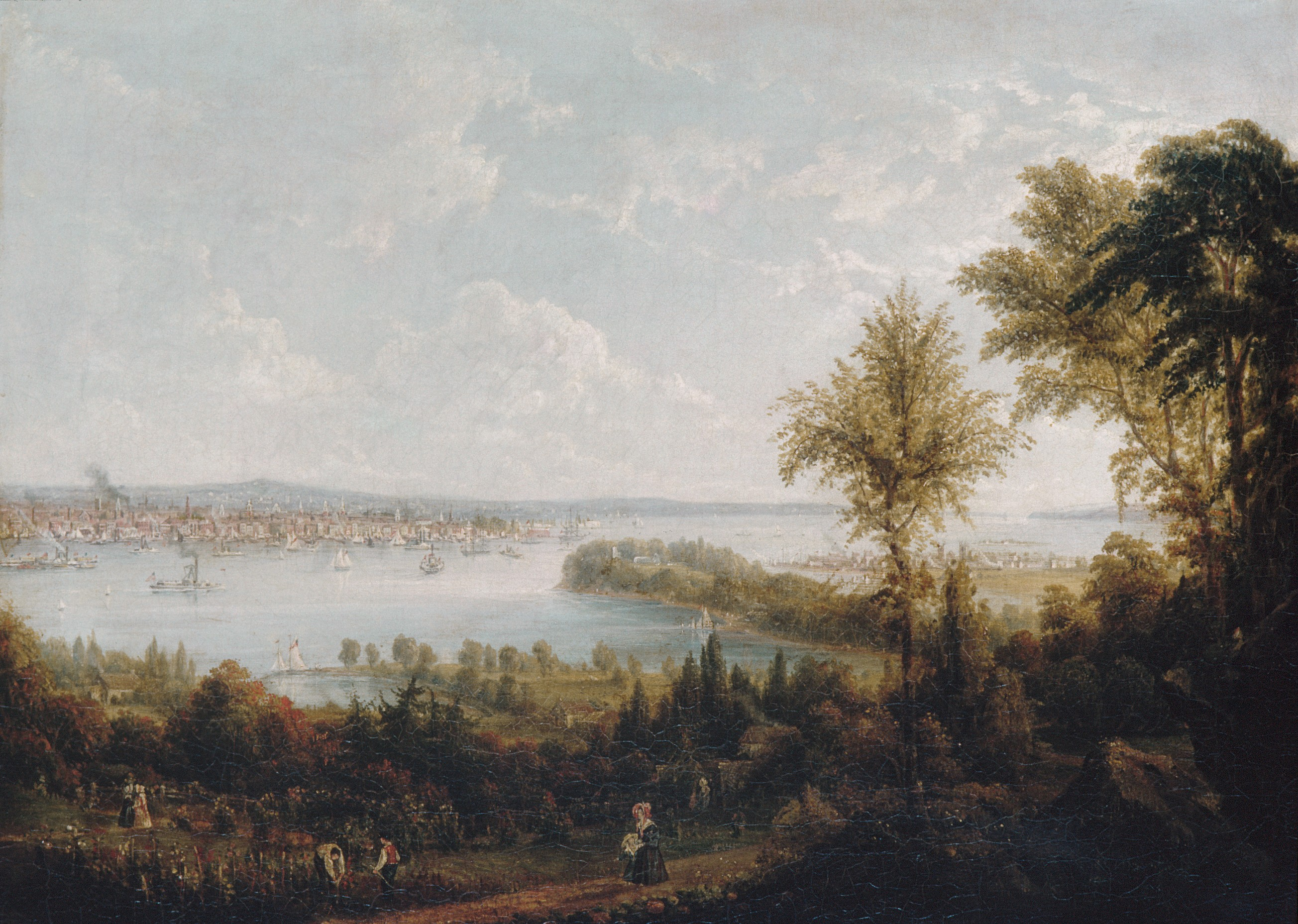
"View of the Bay and City of New York from Weehawken" by Robert Havell, now in the collection of the Metropolitan Museum of Art.

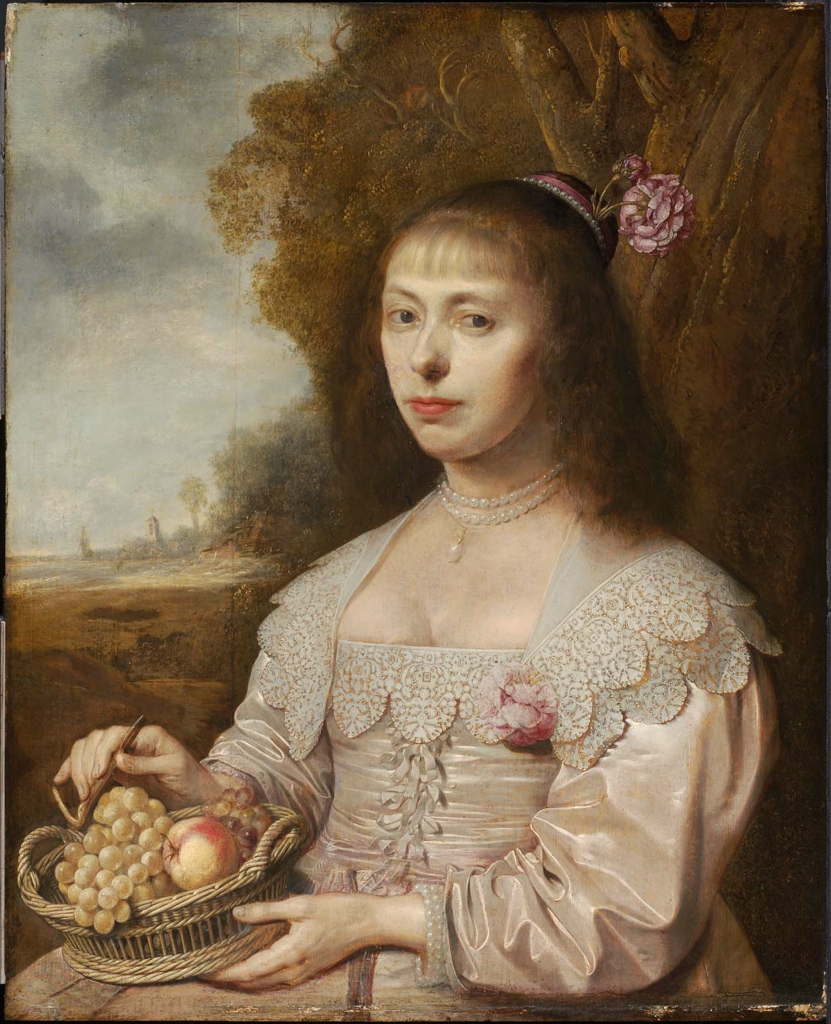
Portrait of a Young Woman Holding a Basket of Fruit by Jacob van der Merck, in the collection of Museum of Fine Arts, Boston.

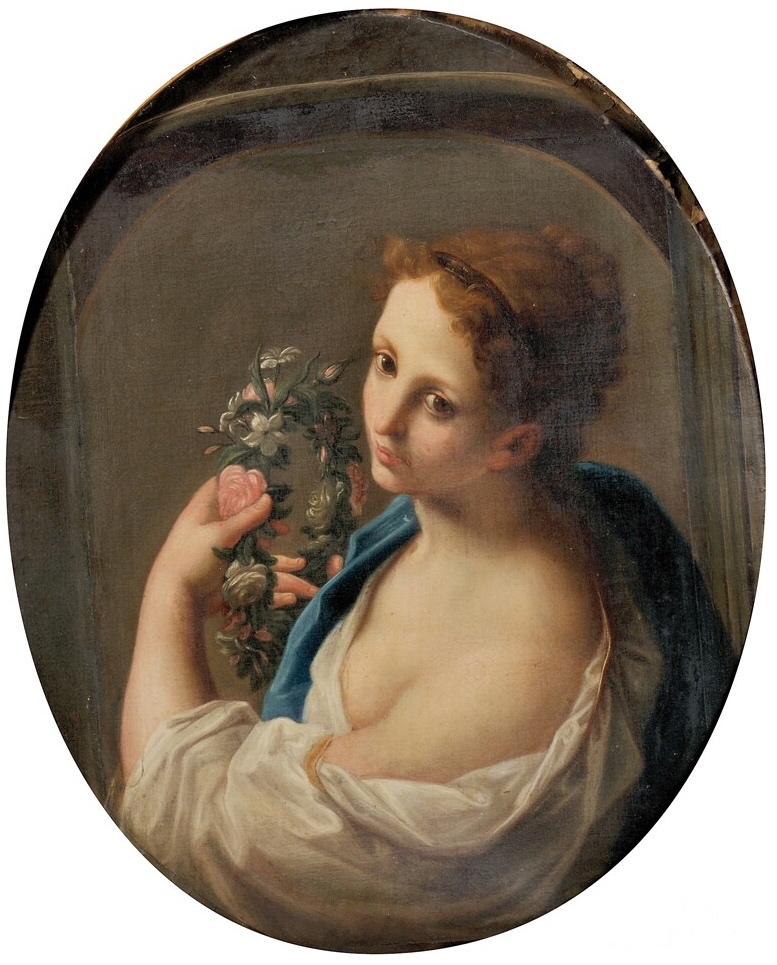
Lady as Flora, by unknown painter.

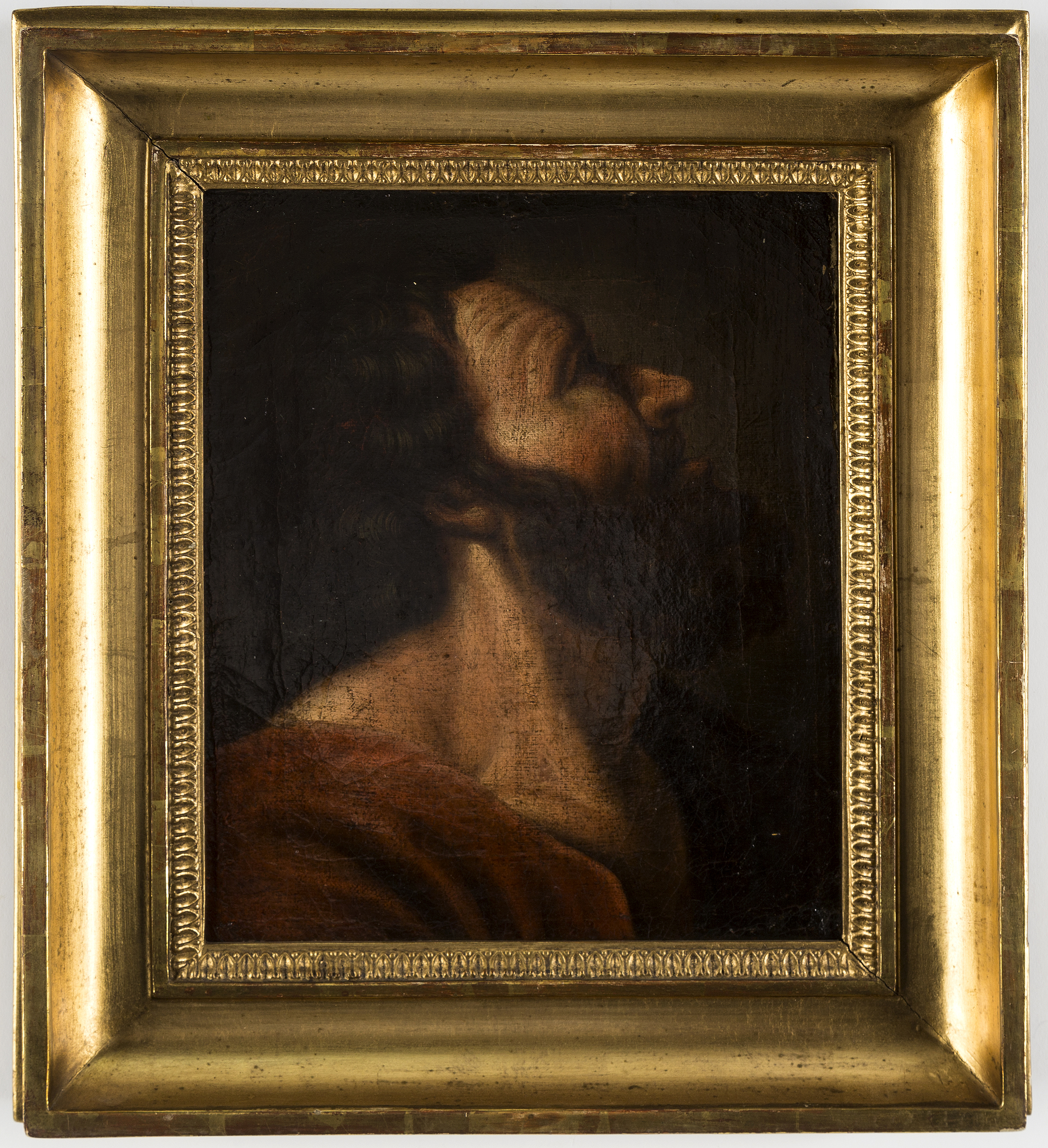
Head of Saint Peter by Giovanni Lanfranco.

== The Thomas Thompson Trust ==
Thompsons will was set up in 1857 and it stipulates how his charitable trust would be set up. His wife, Elizabeth, survived him by more than 30 years and soon after the turn of the 20th Century, his trustees began making grants and have continued to do so for over a hundred year. The instruction to the trustees, made by Thompson simply states that;

apply the net income of the trust fund... for or towards the relief and support, of poor seamstresses, needle-women and shop girls, who may be in temporary need from want of employment, sickness or misfortune, in the towns of Brattleboro, Vermont, and Rhinebeck, Duchess County, New York.

It also stated that:

And I empower my said trustees...to apply surplus to such kindred charitable purposes in said towns or elsewhere, but not however in the City of Boston, as shall be determined by my said Trustees.
