= Pietro Bachi =

Italian academician (1787 – 1853)

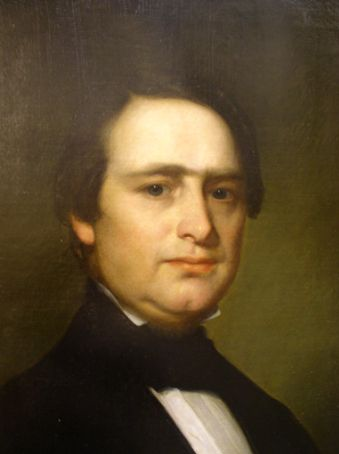
- Portrait of Pietro Bachi, work of Albert Gallatin Hoit, Harvard University Portrait Collection.
- Born: Ignazio Batolo; 1787; Palermo, Kingdom of Sicily
- Died: 22 August 1853 (aged 66); Boston, United States
- Occupations: academic and professor
- Known for: first professor from Italy teaching at Harvard University

Ignazio Batolo, commonly known as Pietro Bachi, (1787, in Palermo – 22 August 1853, in Boston) was a Sicilian American academic and professor. He was the first professor from Italy teaching at Harvard University.

In 1815, he was involved in an attempt aimed at promoting the claim of Joachim Murat to the throne of the Two Sicilies. As a result of this attempt against the House of Bourbon he was forced to change his name with the alias of Pietro Bachi and escape to England and then to the United States.

In 1826, he became professor of Italian, Spanish, and Portuguese language at Harvard University and kept this assignment until 1846. He died in Boston in 1853.

== Biography ==
Pietro Bachi was born in Palermo in 1787 under the name of Ignazio Batolo to Salvatore Batolo, an important magistrate who served as Procuratore Generale del Re at the Grand Civil Court of Palermo and Judge of the Supreme Court of Sicily, of Messina origin. Following in his father's footsteps, he studied law at the University of Padua and practiced law for a time.
