= John Pope (artist) =

American painter

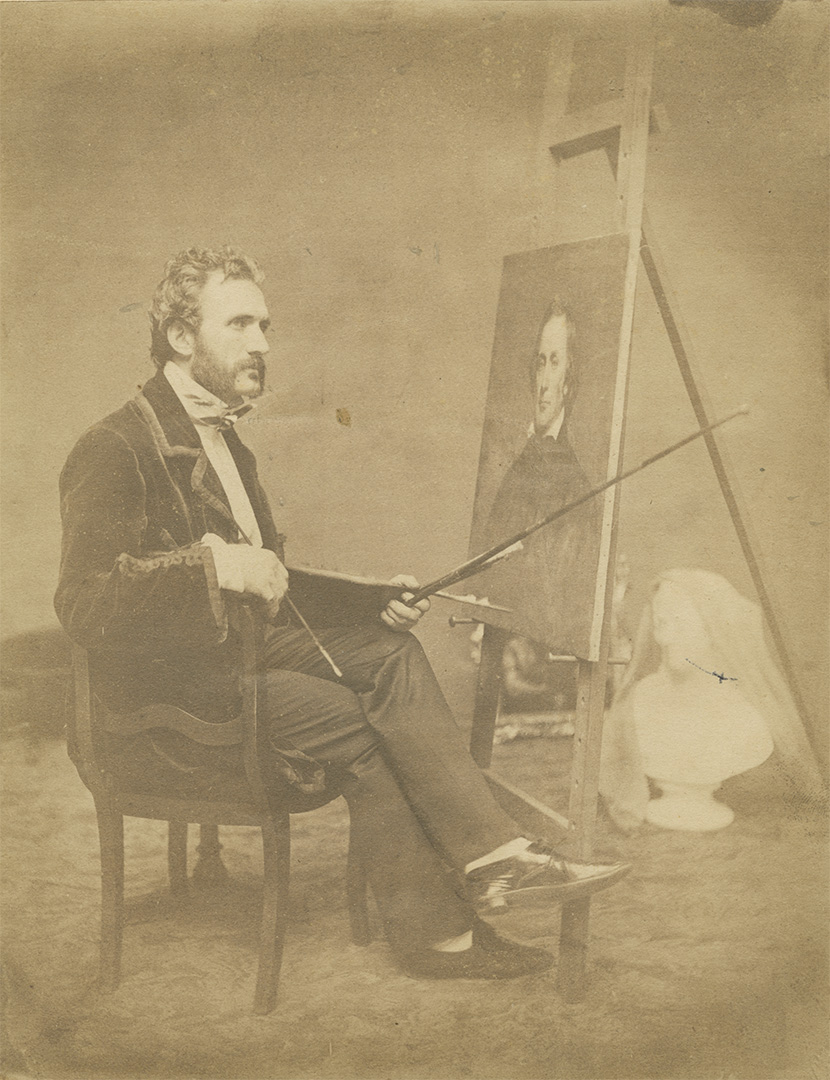
John Pope, 1854, salted paper print by Masury & Silsbee, National Gallery of Art, Washington, DC, Department of Image Collections.

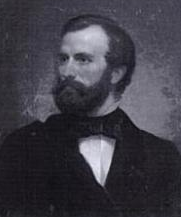
Self-portrait by John Pope, 19th century (National Academy of Design, New York)

John Pope (1820–1880) was an artist in Boston, Massachusetts, and New York in the 19th century. He painted portraits of W.H. Prescott, Daniel Webster and others. He belonged to the Boston Artists' Association; and exhibited with the Massachusetts Charitable Mechanic Association (1844) and the New England Art Union (1852). Pope kept a studio in Boston's Tremont Temple; around 1857 he moved to New York. He died of illness in New York in 1880. According to one report: "Just before dying he called for his paint brush, and died holding it in his hand."
