= Benjamin Franklin Mason =

American artist (1804–1871)

Benjamin Franklin Mason (March 31, 1804 – January 15, 1871) or B.F. Mason was an artist in New England in the mid-19th century. He worked in "Boston, Troy, Buffalo, ... Milwaukee," and Woodstock, Vermont. Around 1852 he kept a studio in Boston's Tremont Temple.
