= Albert Gallatin Hoit =

American painter (1809–1856)

Albert G. Hoit
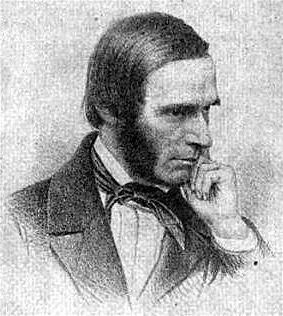
- Born: December 13, 1809; Sandwich, New Hampshire, U.S.
- Died: December 18, 1856 (aged 47); Boston, Massachusetts, U.S.
- Known for: Painting portraits of notable figures, such as the 9th US president, William Henry Harrison.
- Notable work: William Henry Harrison (1840)

Albert Gallatin Hoit (December 13, 1809 – December 18, 1856) was an American painter who lived in Boston, Massachusetts. He painted portraits of William Henry Harrison, Daniel Webster and Brenton Halliburton.

== Biography ==
Hoit was born in Sandwich, New Hampshire, on December 13, 1809, to Gen. Daniel Hoit and Sally Flanders. Siblings included William Henry Hoit. Hoit graduated from Dartmouth College in 1829. He married Susan Hanson in 1838; children included Anna M. Hoit and Albert Hanson Hoit.

He "devoted his life to portrait painting, first at Portland, Maine in 1831, and then in Bangor and Belfast, and Saint John, New Brunswick, Canada, until he settled in Boston in 1839." He also traveled in Europe, "Oct. 1842 to July 1844, ... enjoying the galleries of art in Italy, Paris, and London." He created portraits of Pietro Bachi, Johanna Robinson Hazen, J. Eames, and others. He painted a portrait of Daniel Webster "for Paran Stevens, which hung for years in the Revere House and now belongs to the Union League Club, in New York State."

He was affiliated with the Boston Artists' Association; and exhibited at the gallery of the New England Art Union in the 1850s. In 1848, he kept a studio on Tremont Row in Boston, and lived in Roxbury. By 1852 he had moved his studio to Washington Street. He died in the Jamaica Plain neighborhood of Boston on December 18, 1856, at age 47.

Works by Hoit are in the collection of the Sandwich Historical Society in New Hampshire, the New Brunswick Museum, the National Gallery of Canada, and the Strawbery Banke Museum in Portsmouth, New Hampshire.

== Image gallery ==
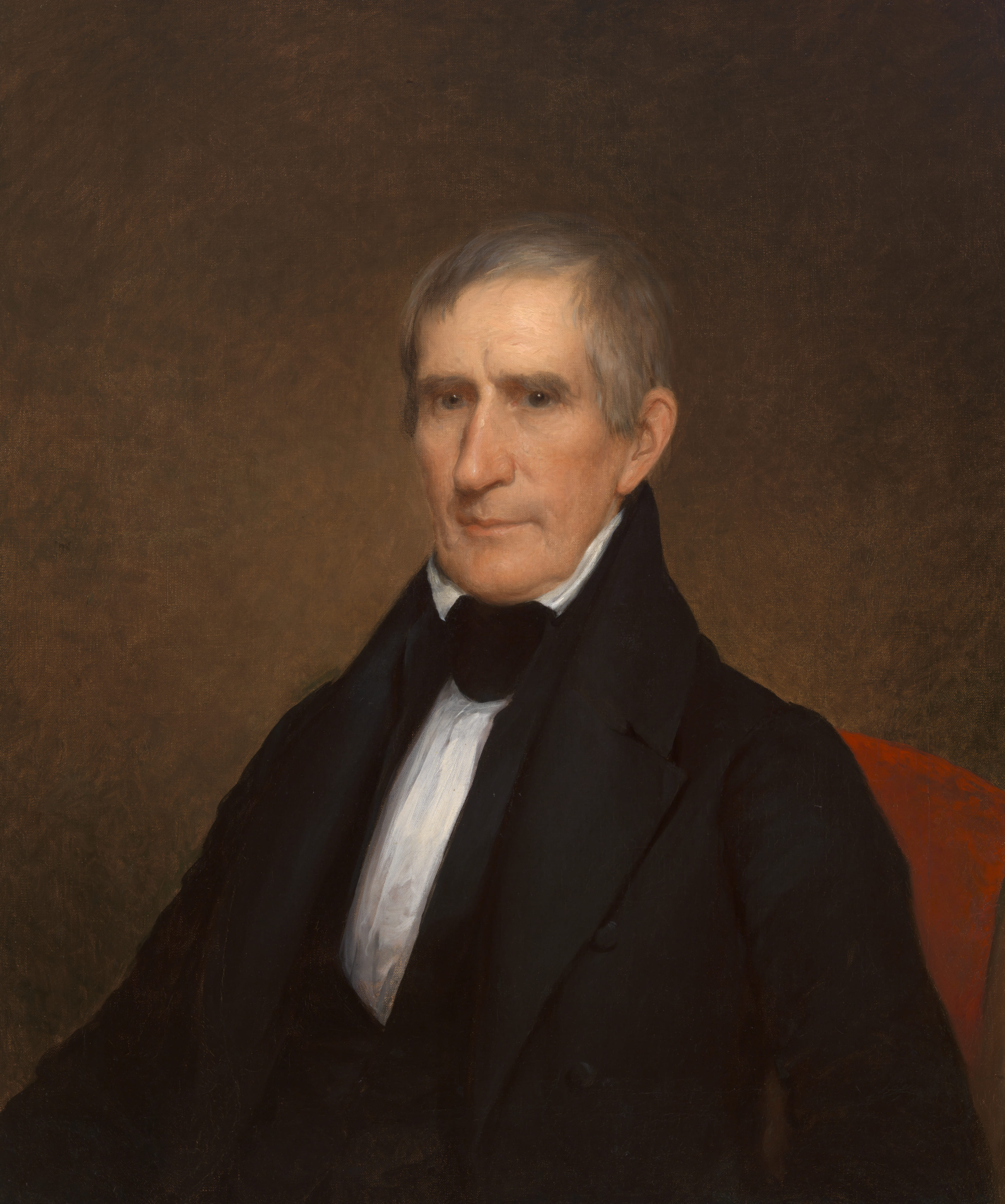
William Henry Harrison, 1840

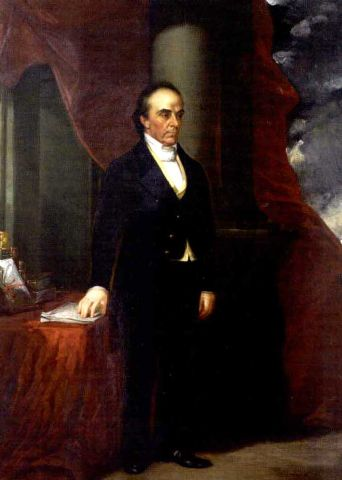
Daniel Webster

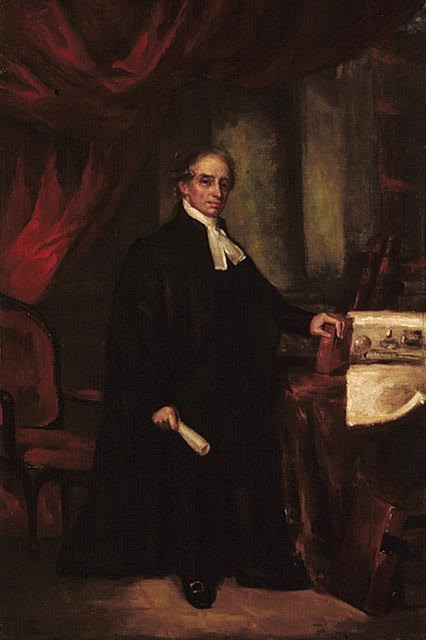
Brenton Halliburton, 1849

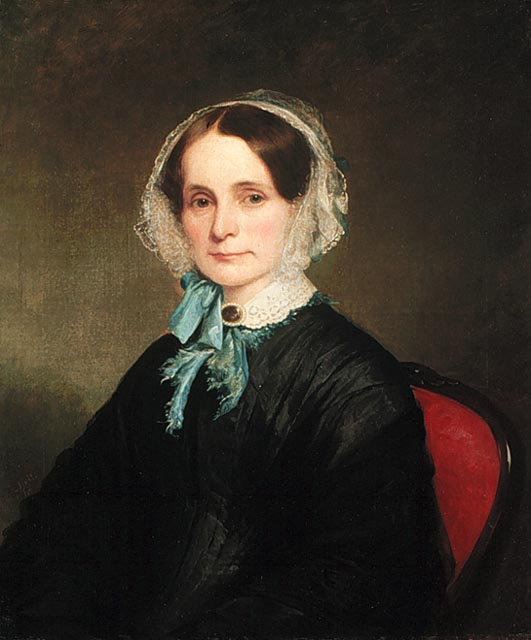
Johanna Robinson Hazen, 1852

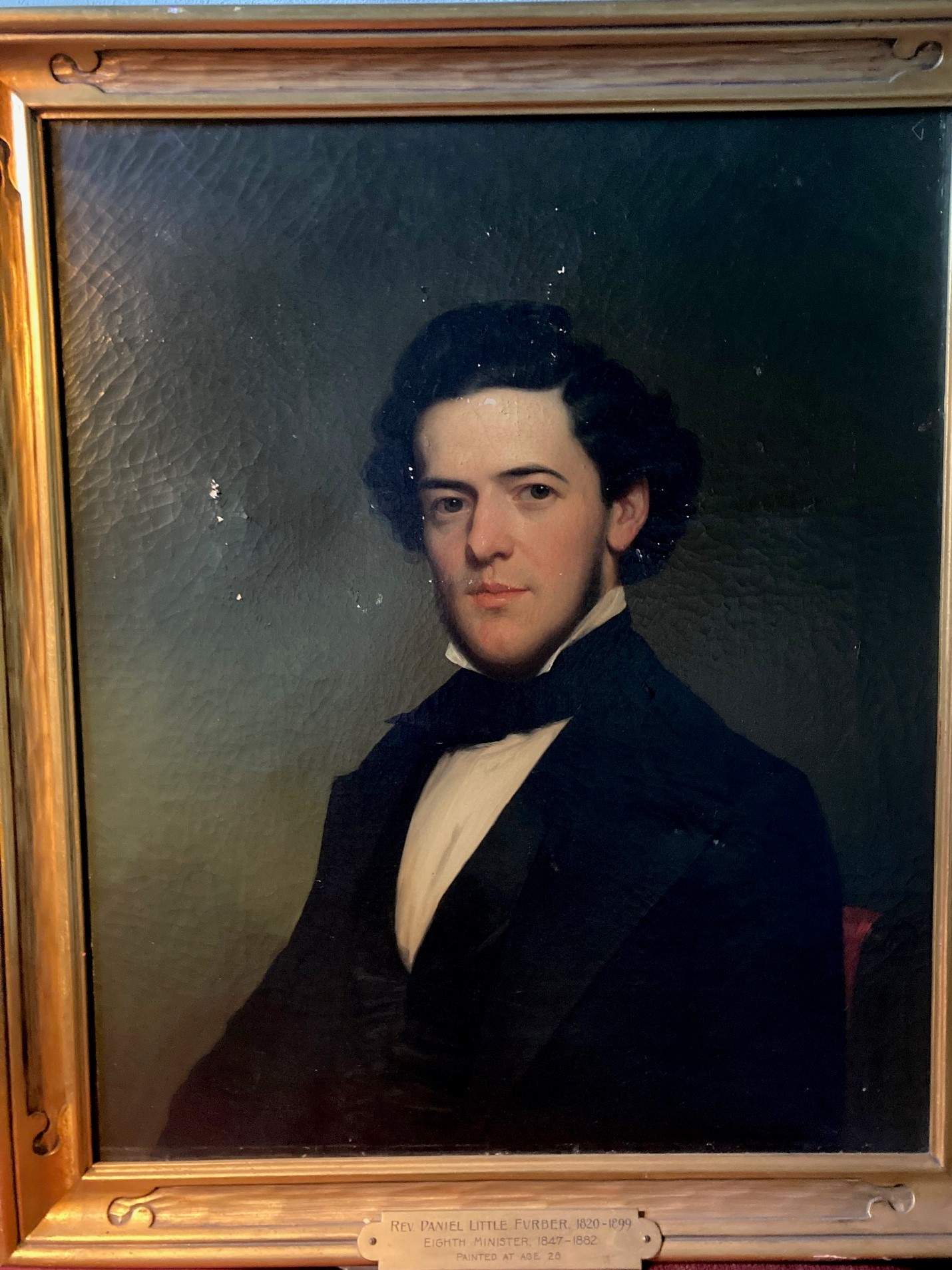
Rev Daniel Little Furber 1848

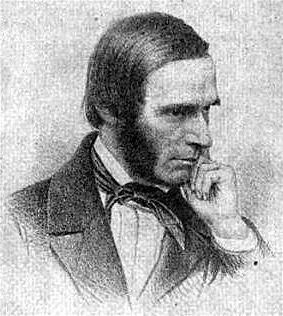
Portrait of A.G. Hoit
