= William Hoogland =

American engraver (c.1794–1832)

William Hoogland (c.1794–1832) was an engraver in Boston, Massachusetts, and New York in the early 19th-century. "Career obscure; but was a designer and engraver of banknotes in New York in 1815." In Boston, contemporaries included Abel Bowen, Annin & Smith, and J.V. Throop. He taught engraving to Joseph Andrews.

== Image gallery ==
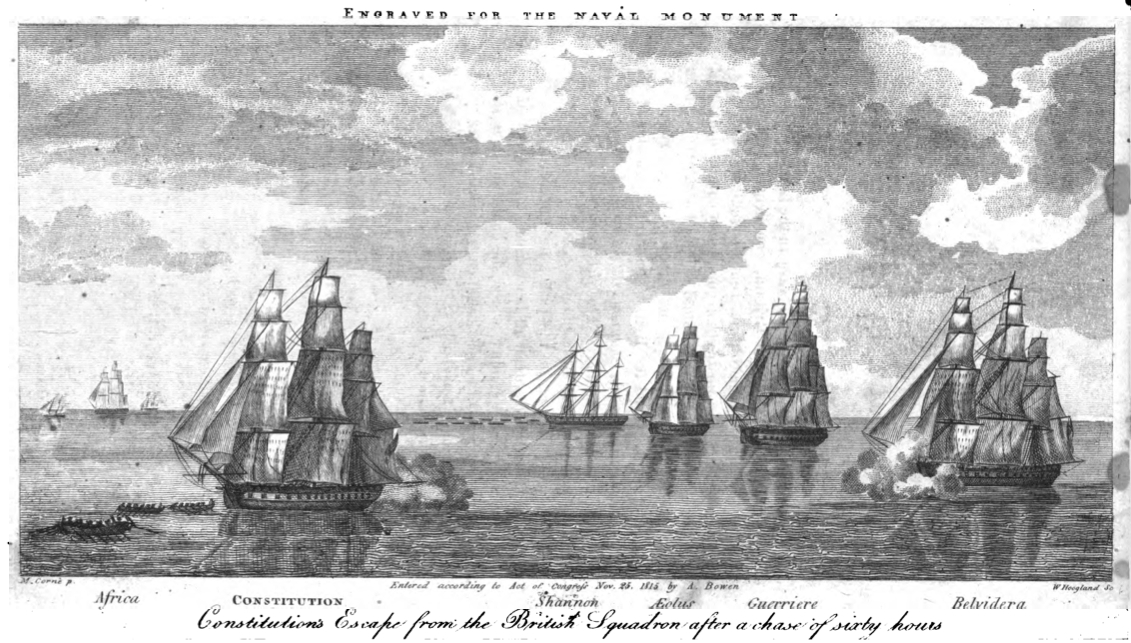
"Constitution's escape from the British squadron;" engraved by Hoogland. From Abel Bowen's Naval Monument, 1816

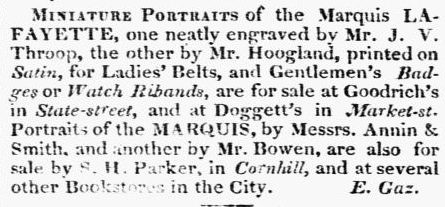
"Miniature portraits of the Marquis Lafayette, ... neatly engraved by ... Mr. Hoogland, printed on satin, for ladies' belts, and gentlemen's badges or watch ribands, are for sale at Goodrich's in State-street, and at Doggett's in Market-St.," August 1824

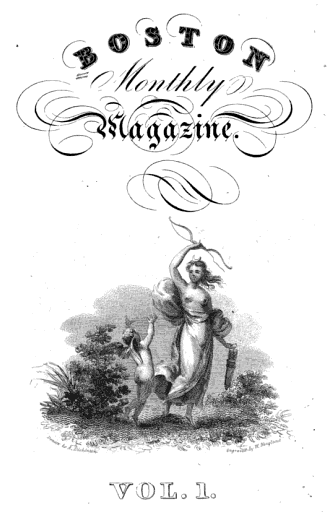
Frontispiece, Boston Monthly Magazine; engraved by Hoogland, 1825

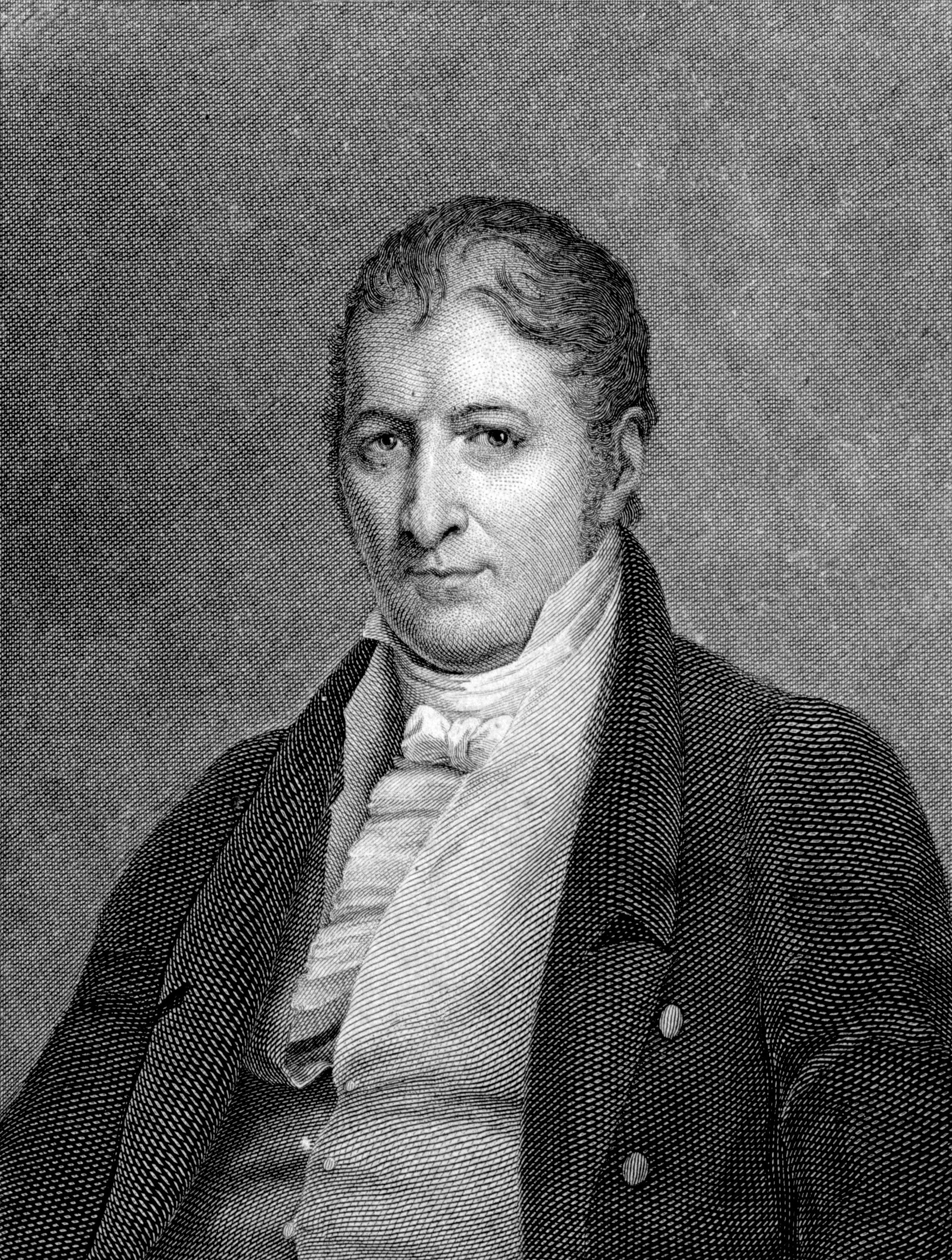
Portrait of Eli Whitney, after a painting by Charles Bird King; engraved by Hoogland, ca.1820s

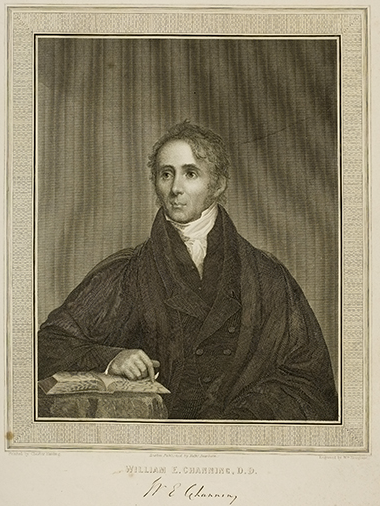
Portrait of William E. Channing, after a painting by Chester Harding; engraved by Hoogland, 1829

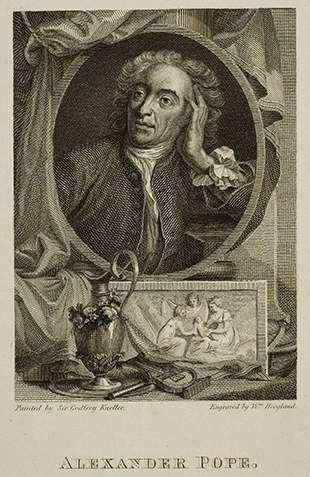
Portrait of Alexander Pope; engraved by Hoogland, ca.1820s-1830s
