= Tremont Temple =

Historic church in Boston, Massachusetts

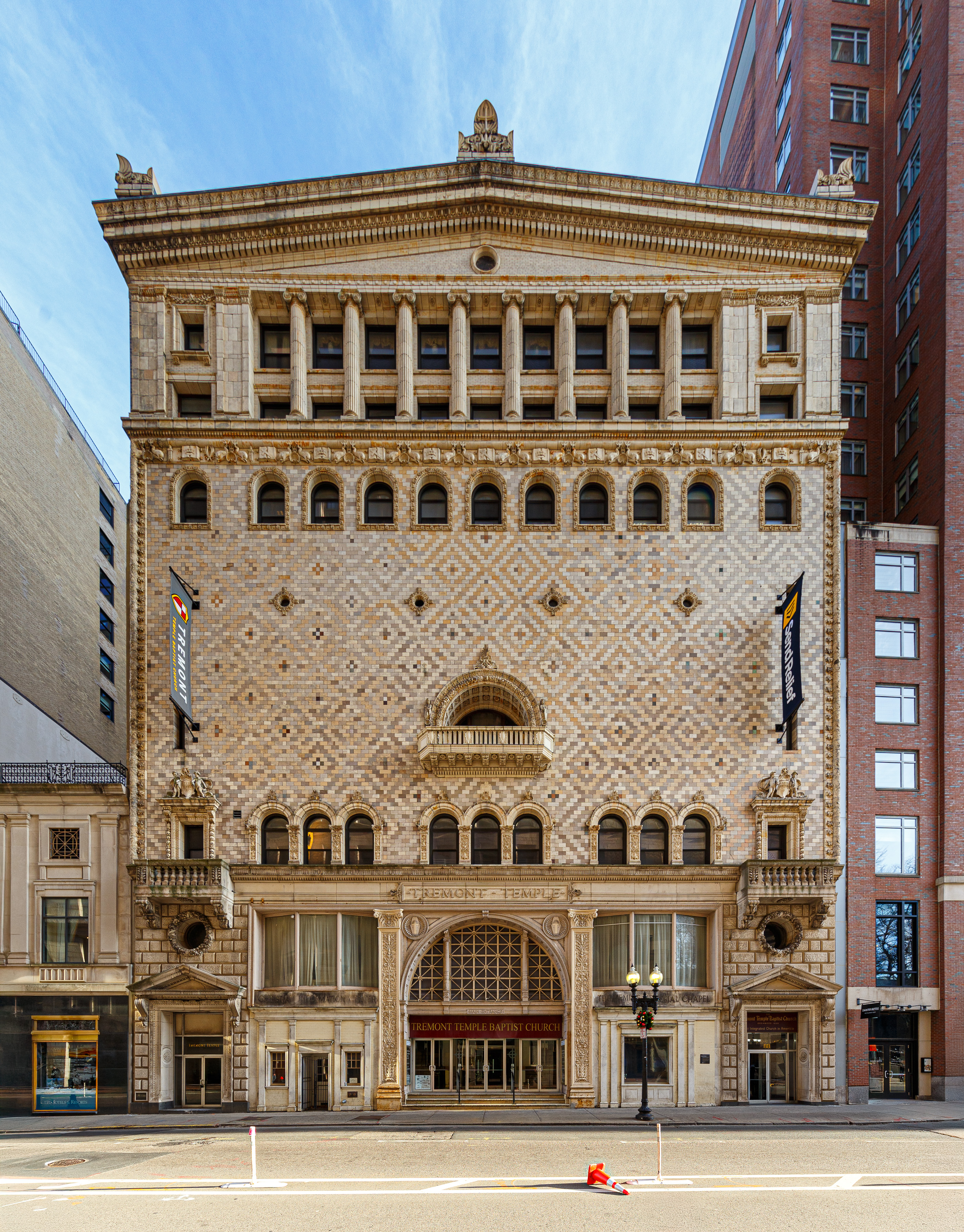
- A 2024 view of the façade
- Tremont Temple
- 42°21′27″N 71°03′39″W
- Address: 88 Tremont Street
- Denomination: Baptist
- Website: tremonttemple.com

History
- Founded: 1839

Architecture
- Architect: Clarence Blackall

The Tremont Temple on 88 Tremont Street is a Baptist church in Boston, Massachusetts, affiliated with the American Baptist Churches, USA and the Southern Baptist Convention. An elder-led congregation, Jaime E. Owens is the current Senior Pastor since 2017.

The existing multi-storey, Renaissance Revival structure was designed by Boston architect Clarence Blackall, and opened in May 1896. It replaced a much smaller 1827 structure which had repeatedly suffered damage by fires.

The new facility was designed with a large auditorium, ground-floor retail shops, and upper-story offices, all of which could be leased commercially so that the congregation could welcome all worshippers for free.

In January 2023, the building exterior was declared a historic landmark by the Boston Landmarks Commission.

== History ==
The Church was formed in 1839 as The Free Baptist Church. On 28 December 1843, the Free Church Baptists bought the Tremont Theatre, built in 1827 in Greek Revival style. They renamed it the Tremont Temple and adapted it for use for religious worship. They did not charge for attending their church and had a racially integrated congregation.

Although the building was largely used for religious purposes, it also served occasionally as the venue for public events. An Egyptian mummy was displayed beginning on 28 September 1850, and Sam Houston gave a speech there against slavery on 22 February 1855. Boston had a strong community of abolitionists, both black and white. Wendell Phillips gave a speech there the day after Lincoln’s election: “the slave has chosen a President … Not an Abolitionist, hardly an antislavery man, Mr. Lincoln consents to represent an idea. A pawn on the chessboard. … we may soon change him for knight, Bishop or queen, and sweep the board (applause).” Frederick Douglass spoke there on December 3, 1860, in a hotly contested and even violent anti-slavery gathering that had to be quelled by Boston police.

The Temple was damaged by fire in April 1852; at the time, offices were occupied by music instructors, dentists, a taxidermist, and several artists: Fitz Henry Lane, Benjamin Champney, Mr. Kimberly, John C. King, B. F. Mason, Wellman Morrison, John Pope, and John W. A. Scott. It was also used for the storage of Thomas Thompson extensive art collection, largely destroyed. The temple suffered subsequent fires in 1879 and 1893 and was repaired.

The Temple was the site of Charles Dickens' first reading during his 1867–68 tour of the United States. Dickens read from "A Christmas Carol" and "The Pickwick Papers" during his two-hour reading on December 2, 1867.

The congregation called it Tremont Street Baptist Church and later Union Temple Baptist Church, adopting the name Tremont Temple Baptist Church in 1891. The Reverend George C. Lorimer served as pastor of the church for twenty-one years, interrupted by brief pastorships in other locations. He left in 1901, after guiding the congregation through construction and opening of a new building, to move to a New York City congregation.

The congregation had decided on a new, larger structure, which was completed and opened in May 1896. Designed by architect Clarence Blackall, it was intended to be a church with an auditorium and other spaces suitable for leasing for business purposes, in order to support church functions. The building originally was designed with retail stores on the ground floor and commercial offices on the upper floors. Revenue from business rents and rental of the auditorium for concerts enabled the church to continue to provide free seats to all worshippers.

At various times in the 20th century, films were screened at Tremont Temple, though commercial leasing ended in 1956. The auditorium was used December 31, 1985, for a staged production of the opera The Burning Fiery Furnace by Benjamin Britten.

== See also ==
- Black Nativity

== Image gallery ==
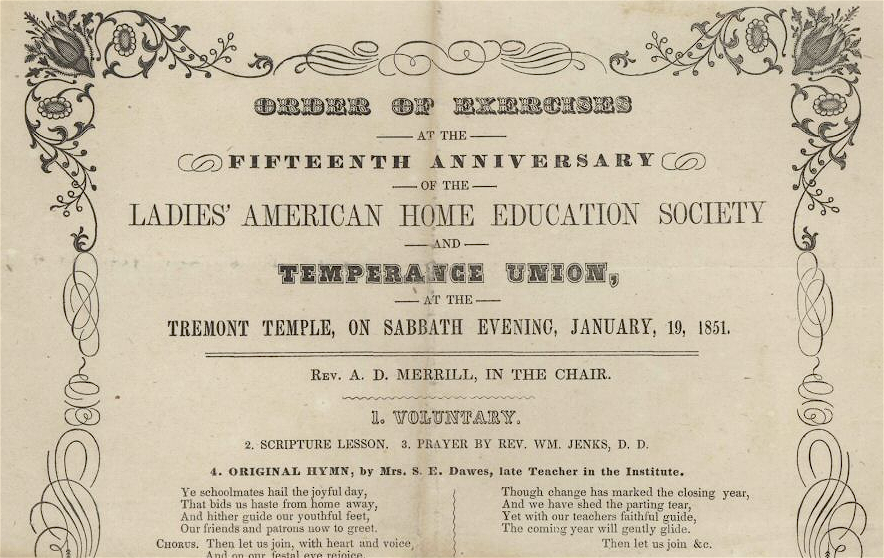
15th anniversary of the Ladies' American Home Education Society and Temperance Union, at the former Tremont Temple, on Sabbath evening, January 19, 1851

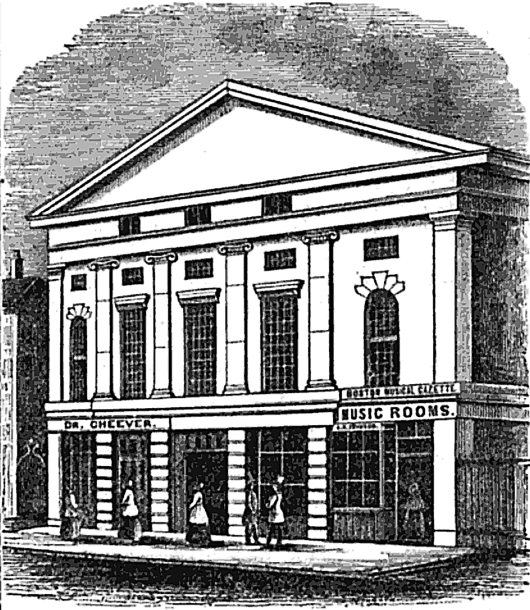
Former Tremont Temple, 1851

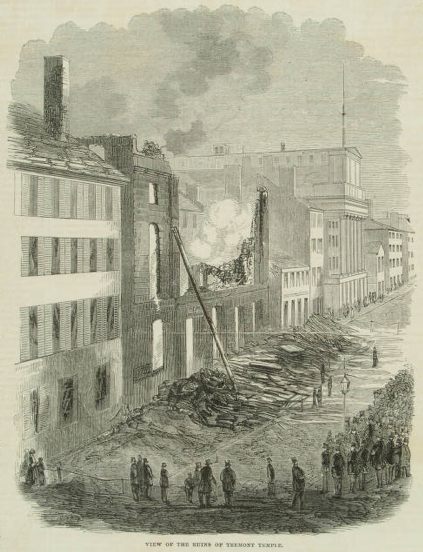
Ruins after the fire, 1852

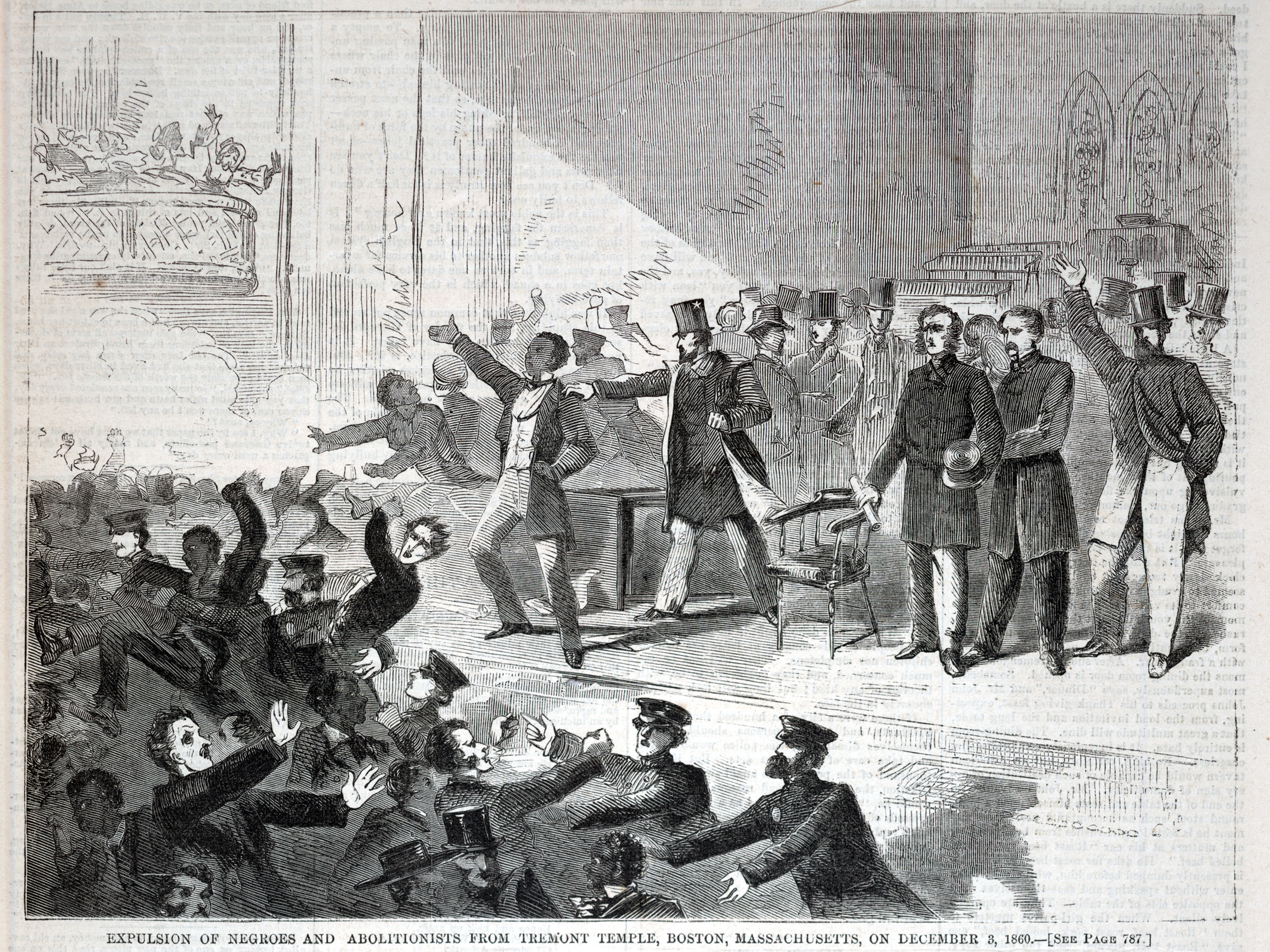
This illustration, published in Harper's Weekly. in 1860, depicts the "Expulsion of Negroes and abolitionists" from the temple

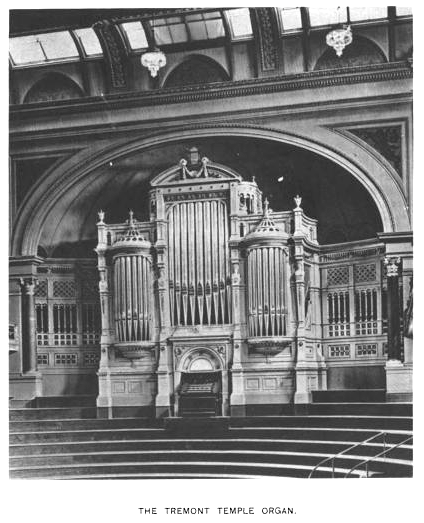
Former Tremont Temple interior, ca.1881

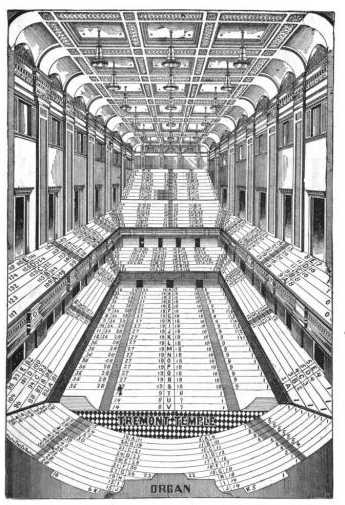
Interior, circa 1883

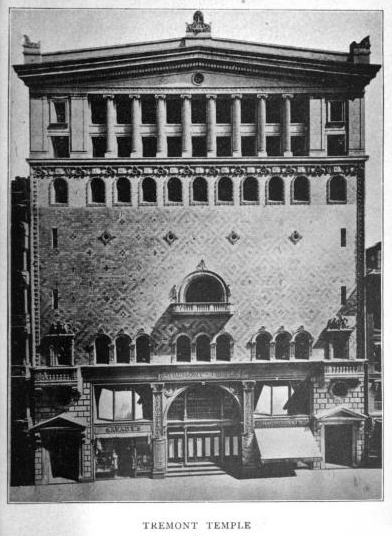
The building, circa 1904

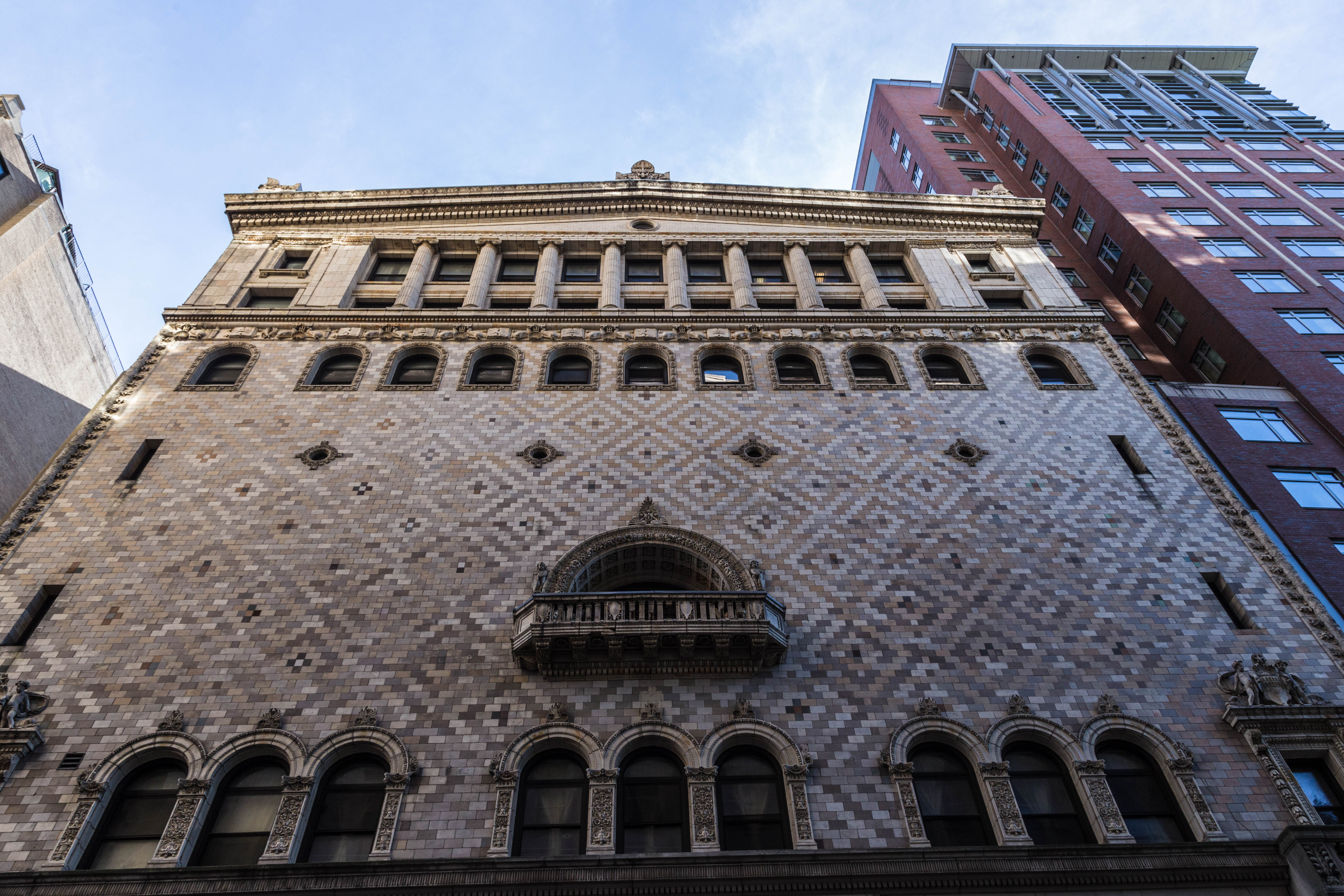
The facade of the building as it appears today

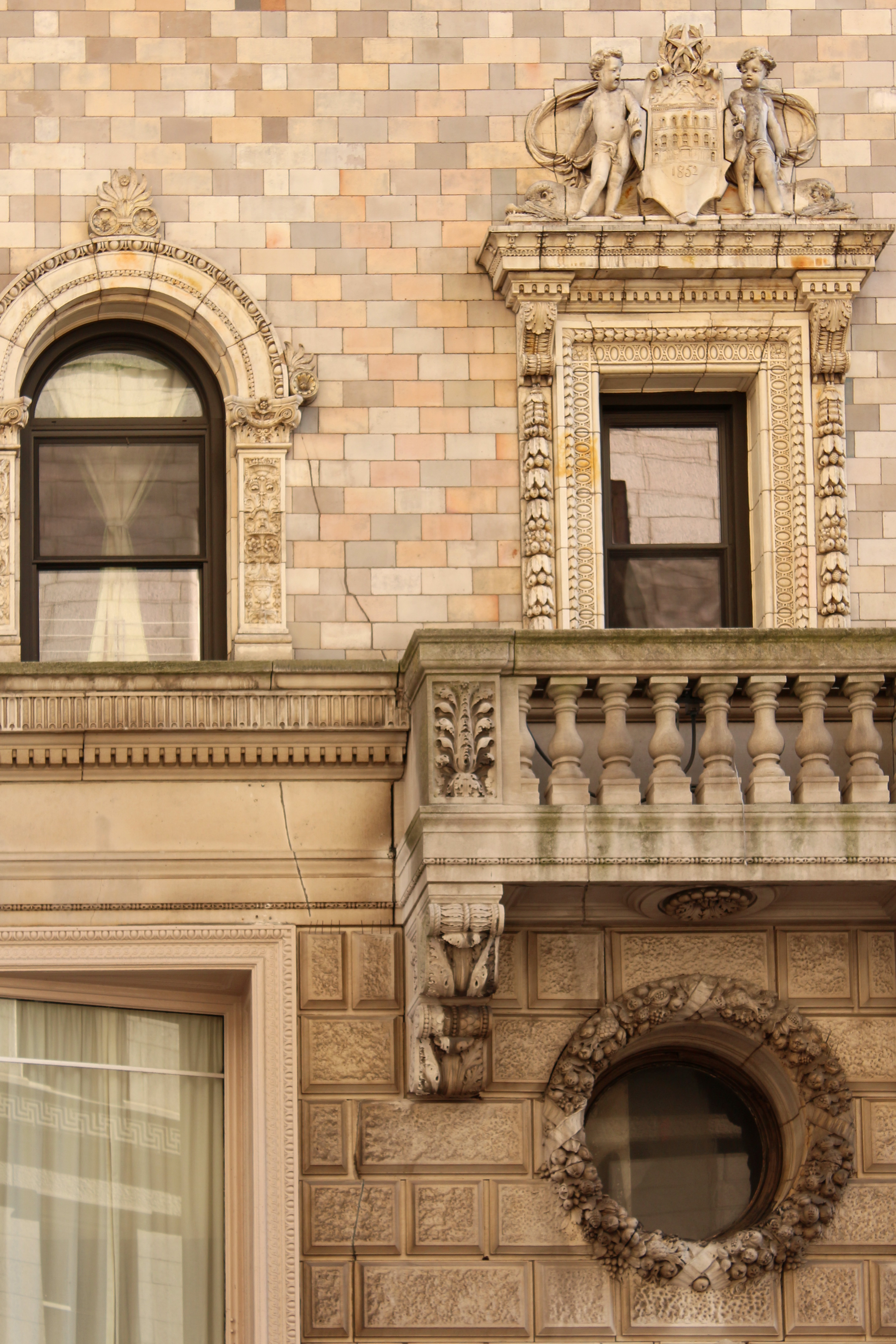
Details on the building's Renaissance Revival facade
