= John Ritto Penniman =

American painter (1782-1841)

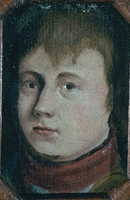
Self-portrait by J.R. Penniman, 1796 (Worcester Art Museum)

John Ritto Penniman (1782–1841) was a painter in Boston, Massachusetts, United States. He created portraits, landscapes, and allegorical paintings, as well as designs for engravings, such as the official seal of the city of Boston in 1822. He also worked as an assistant to Gilbert Stuart. Penniman died in 1841 in Baltimore.
