= David Claypoole Johnston =

American cartoonist (1799–1865)

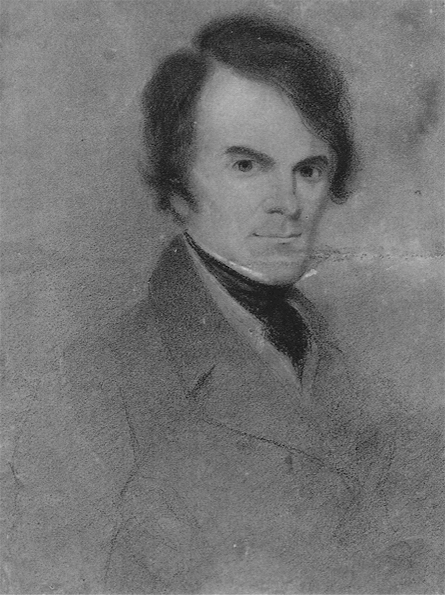
- Self-portrait by D.C. Johnston, c. 1830
- Born: March 25, 1799; Philadelphia
- Died: October 8, 1865; Dorchester, MA
- Known for: cartoonist

David Claypoole Johnston (March 25, 1799 – November 8, 1865) was a 19th-century American cartoonist, printmaker, painter, and actor from Boston, Massachusetts. He was the first natively trained American to master all the various graphic arts processes of lithography, etching, metal plate engraving, and wood engraving.

== Life and career ==
Johnston was born in Philadelphia, the son of William Johnston and Charlotte Rowson, an actress who was sister-in-law of author actress and educator Susanna Rowson. In 1815, Johnston had studied engraving as an apprentice of Philadelphia engraver Francis Kearney, and he himself became an engraver of original caricatures, which were too controversial for publishing. In 1821, he switched to a theatrical career, appearing for the first time at the Walnut Street Theatre on March 10, 1821, as Henry in Speed the Plough. He performed for five seasons with theatre companies in Philadelphia and Boston.

Afterward, he retired from the stage and set up an engraver's office in Boston. His most important early work was a series of etched and lithographed character portraits of well-known American and British actors. In the years between 1829 and 1849, he published nine numbers of his annual comic Scraps, made of four plates, each containing nine or ten separate humorous sketches.

== Image gallery ==
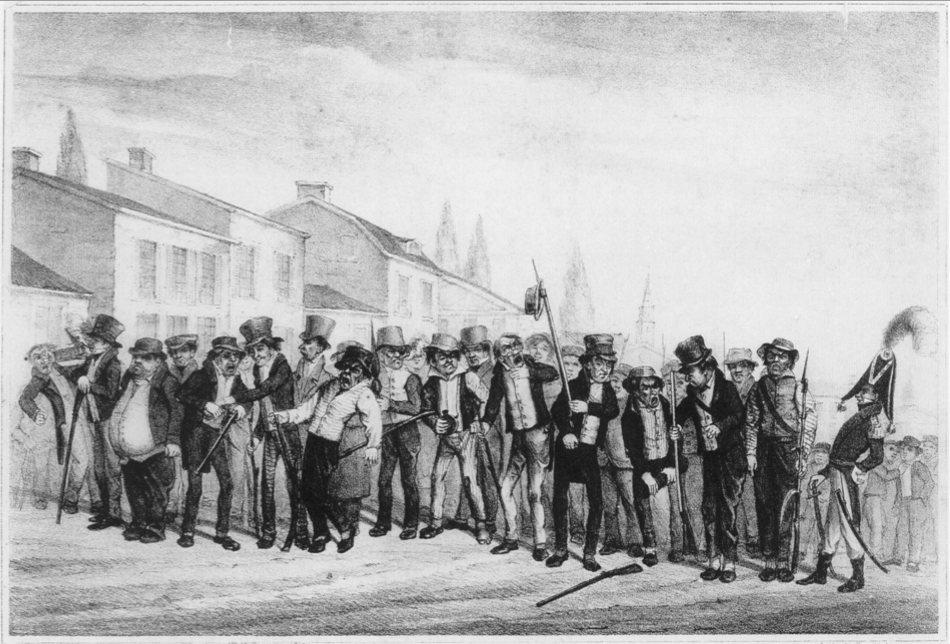
Militia Muster 1828

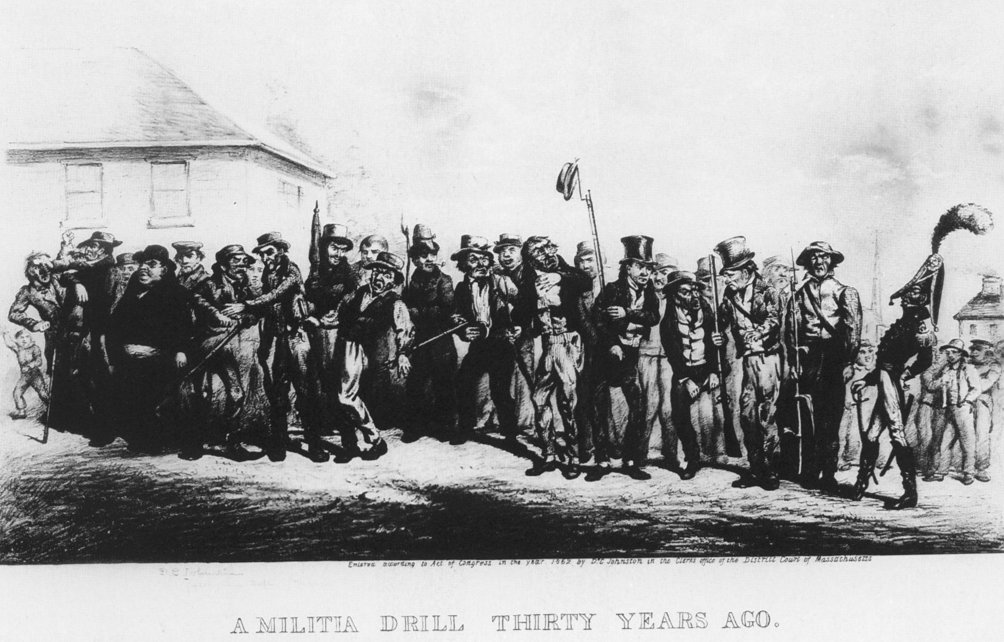
A Militia Drill Thirty Years ago [1862]

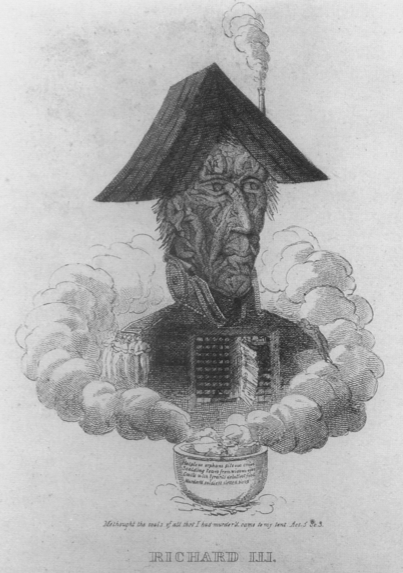
Richard III, 1828

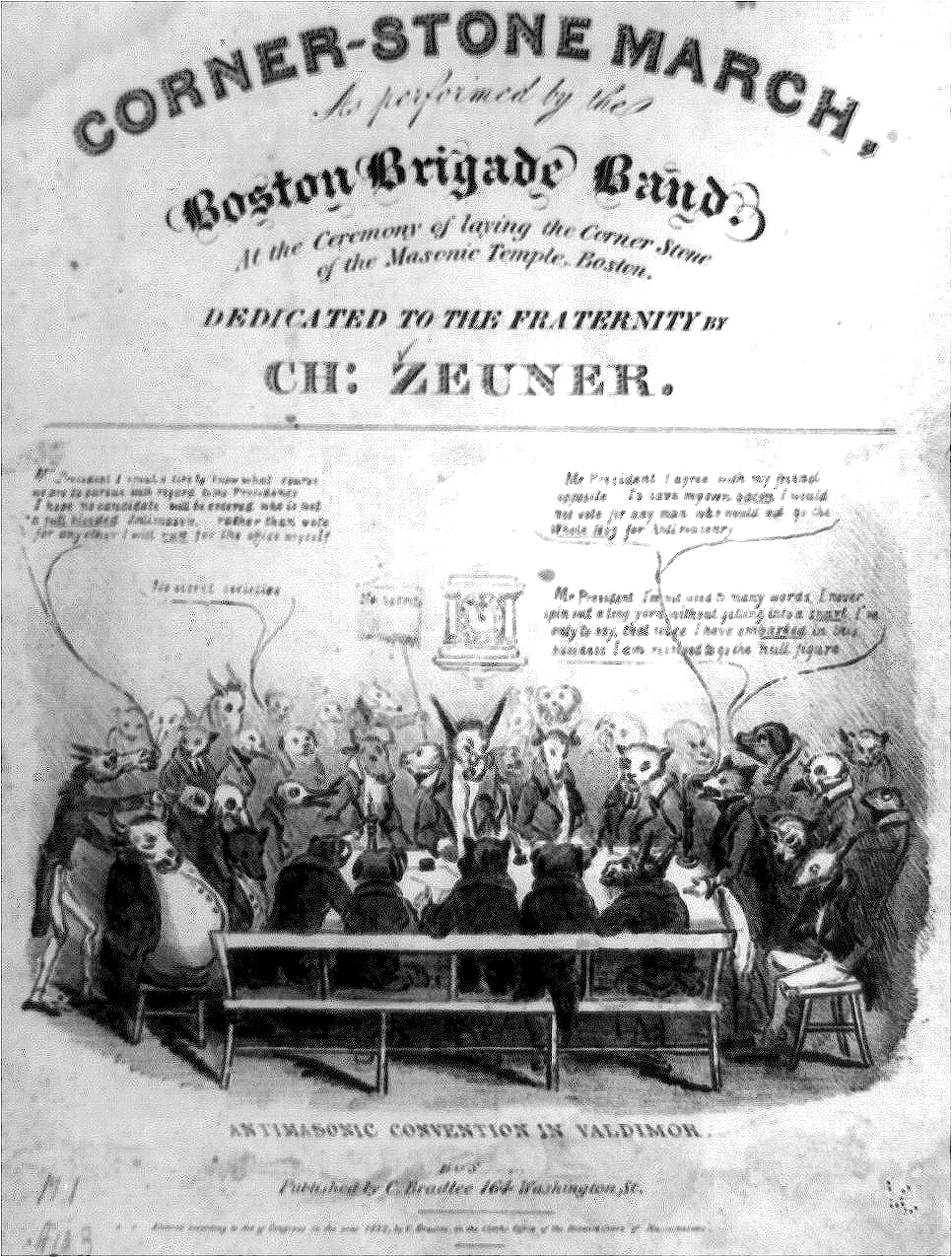
"Anti-Masonic Convention in Valdimor," cover illustration of Corner-Stone March, as Performed by the Boston Brigade Band, 1832

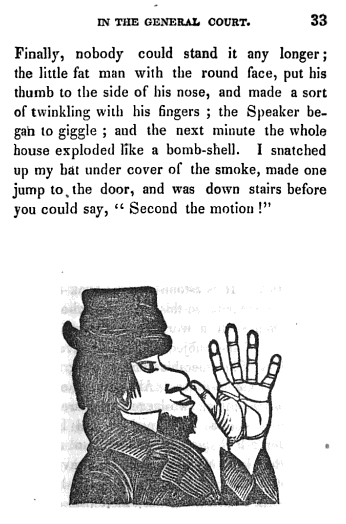
From: Yankee Notions 1838

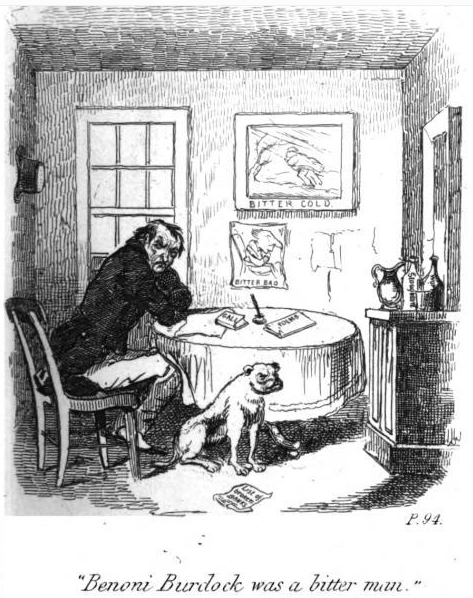
"Benoni Burdock was a bitter man." From: Yankee Notions 1838

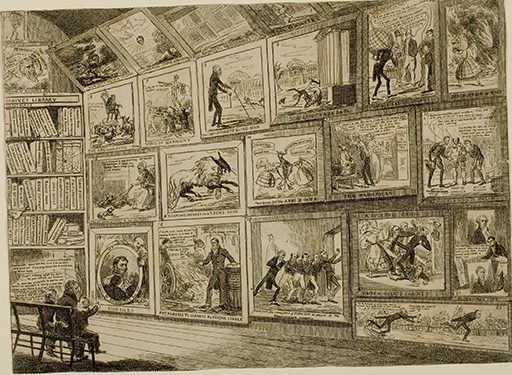
Exhibition of Cabinet Pictures

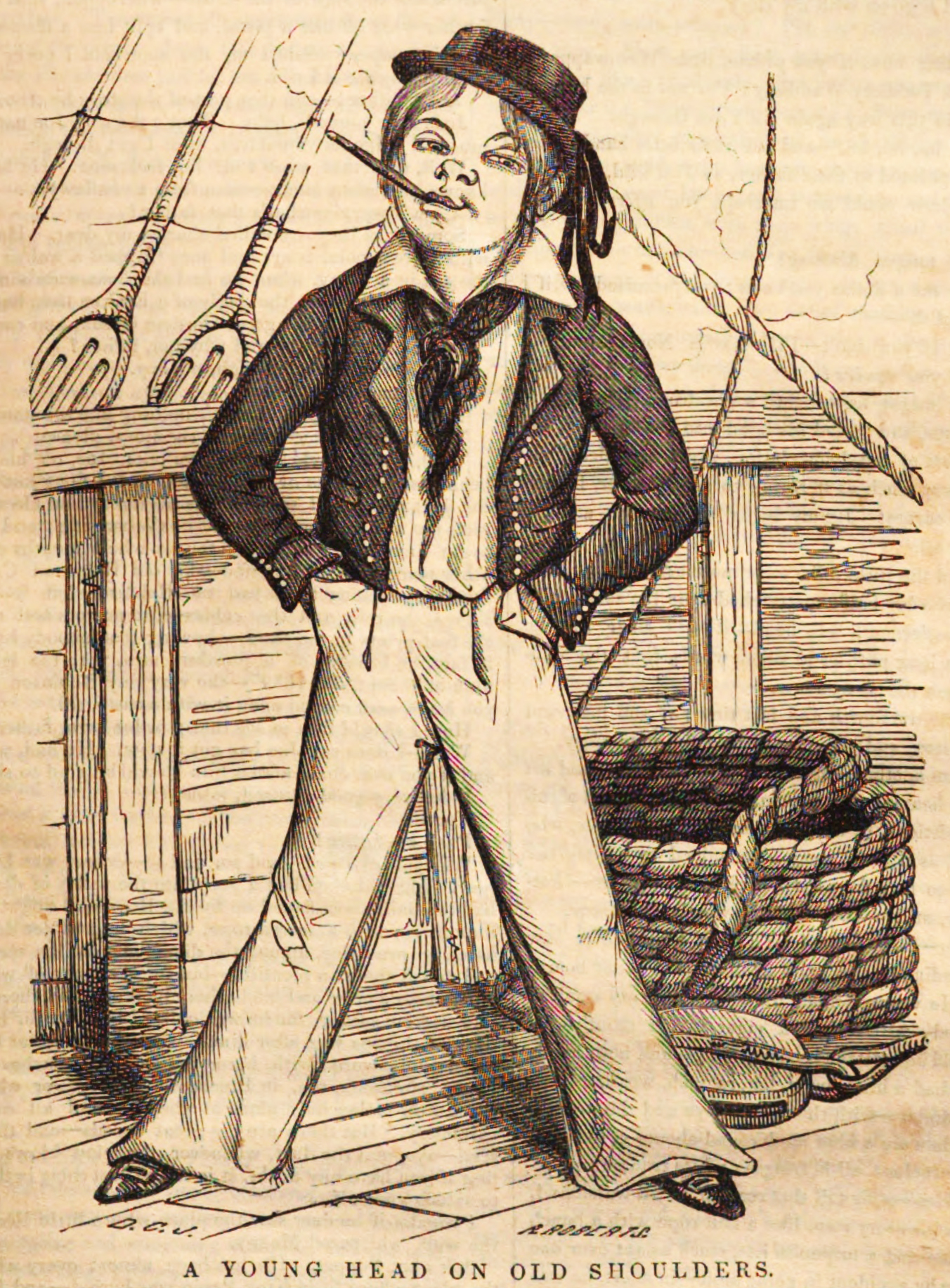
A Young Head on Old Shoulders. From: "Little Joe Junk and the Fisherman's Daughter" by John Neal in Brother Jonathan, March 12, 1842

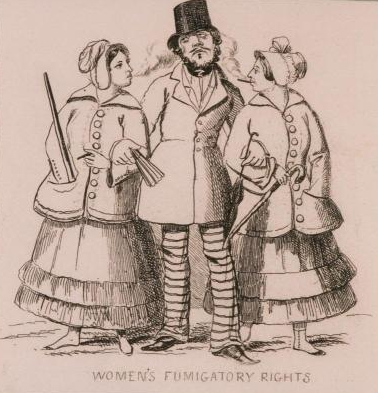
Women's Fumigatory Rights. From: Scraps, 1849

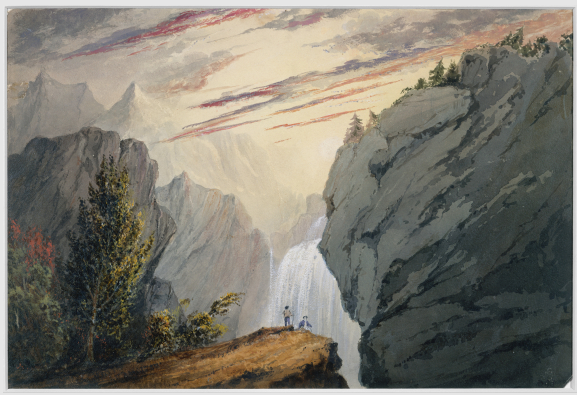
At the Waterfall, ca.1850 watercolor

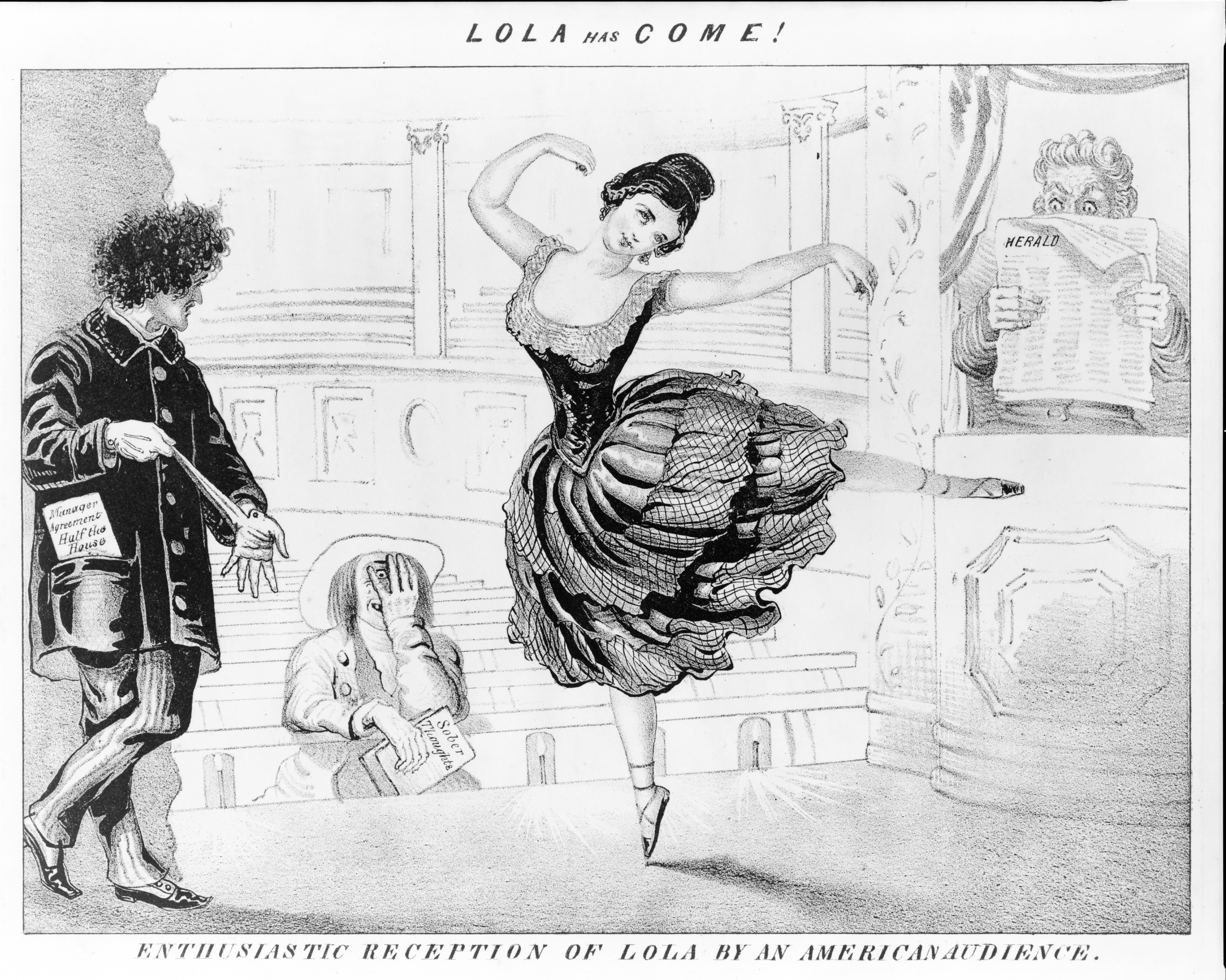
Lola Has Come, ca.1852

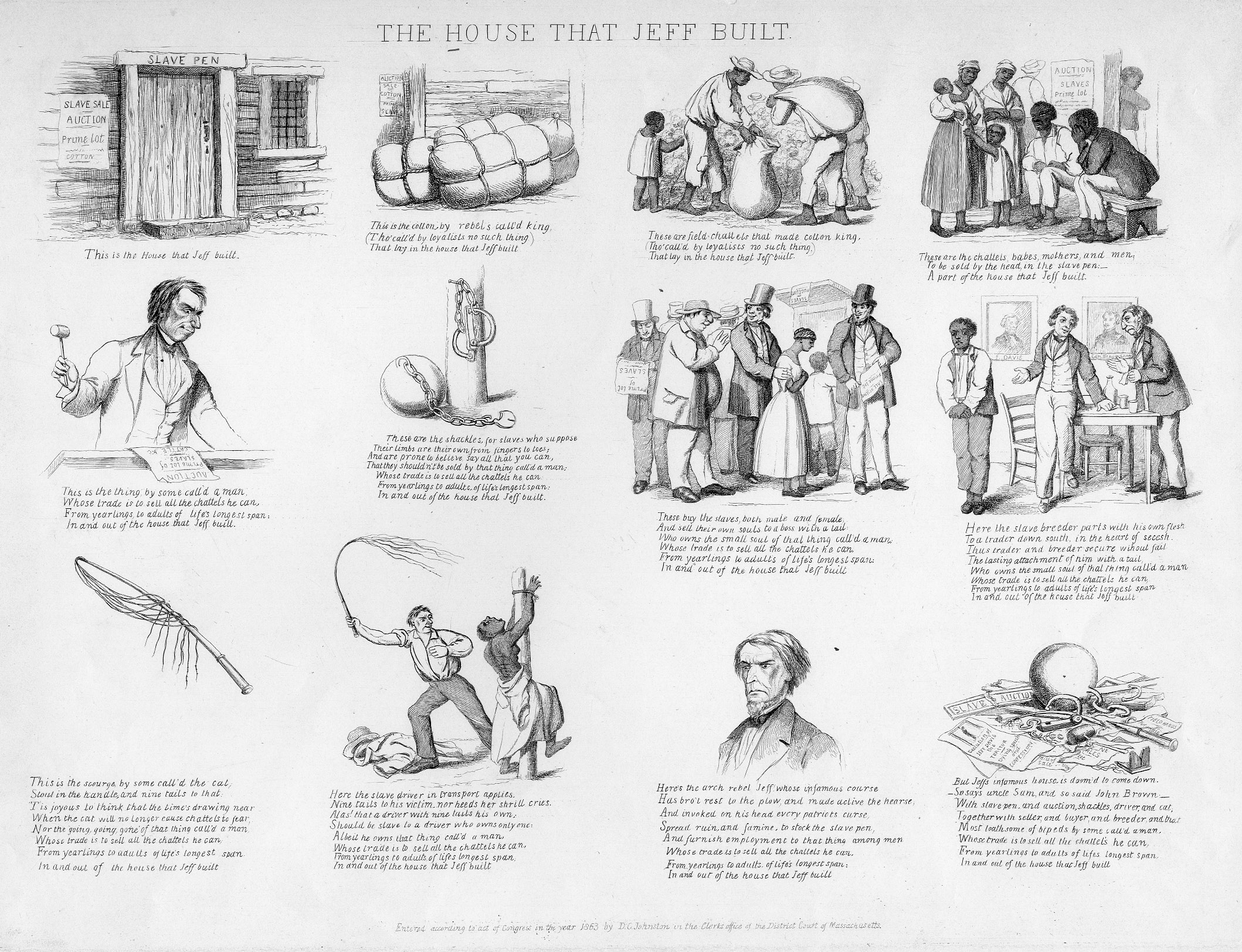
"The House That Jeff Built", denunciation of Jefferson Davis and slavery, 1863
