= Samuel Cooper Thacher =

American clergyman and librarian

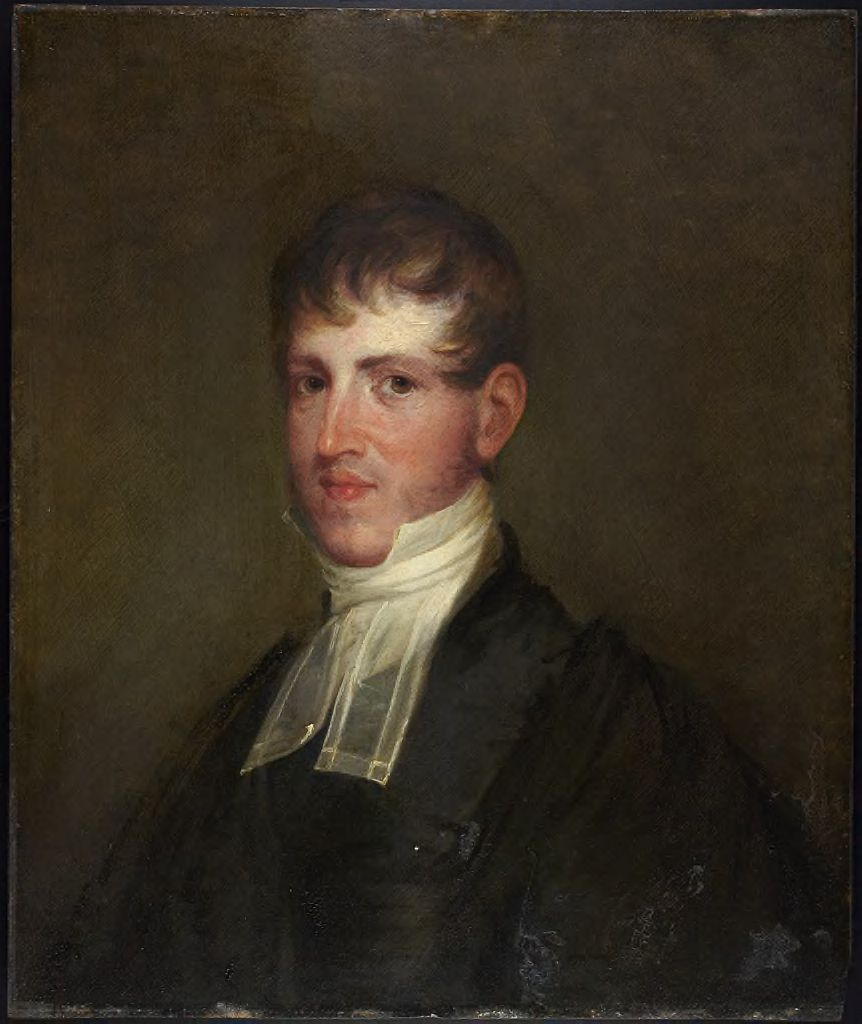

Orders
- Ordination: May 15, 1811

Personal details
- Born: December 14, 1785 Boston, Massachusetts, U.S.
- Died: January 2, 1818 (aged 32) Moulins. Allier, Kingdom of France
- Parents: Peter Thacher (father)
- Education: Harvard College (1804)

Pastor of New South Church in Boston, Massachusetts
- In office 1811–1818
- Preceded by: John Thornton Kirkland
- Succeeded by: F. W. P. Greenwood

Samuel Cooper Thacher (December 14, 1785 – January 2, 1818) was an American clergyman and librarian.

Thacher, who was born in Boston, on December 14, 1785, was sprung from a long line of preachers. His father Peter was the pastor of the Brattle Street Church in Boston, and his grandfathers were both ministers, including Peter Thacher, who in the beginning of the seventeenth century was a clergyman at Salisbury, England. It was not strange, that immediately after his graduation from Harvard College at the head of the class of 1804, he should have "all his hopes and wishes directed" to preparing himself for the ministry. He studied theology in Boston under Dr. Channing and then spent two years in Europe. Upon his return to the United States, he was in 1808 elected Harvard College librarian. This office he held for the term of three years.

At the inauguration of Harvard President John Thornton Kirkland on November 14, 1810, Thacher was appointed to deliver the Latin congratulatory address, a performance for which he received high praise. Not long after this event, Thacher was called to fill the pulpit of the New South Church in Boston, left vacant by Kirkland. His ordination took place May 15, 1811. He began his pastorate with enthusiasm and success, but before many years his health failed, and the remainder of his life was a brave but unavailing struggle against consumption. In August 1816, he sailed for England, hoping to benefit by the change. The first winter he passed at the dreary Cape of Good Hope, and the next fall he went to Moulins, France. Neither of these places helped him much, and at the latter he died, on January 2, 1818. There he was buried and over his grave is a monument bearing a Latin inscription by his friend and classmate Andrews Norton (Librarian, 1813–1821).

Thacher was elected a Fellow of the Harvard Corporation on February 19, 1816, but was present at only a few meetings before his departure for Europe. He was also a member of the American Academy. After his death his library, consisting of 676 lots, was sold at auction. By vote of the Harvard Corporation, the president was authorized to expend $50 at the sale on books for the college Library. Thacher wrote a number of articles for the Monthly Anthology, and published one sermon, preached at the dedication of the new church in 1814. His sermon on the Unity of God, in which he gives a clear exposition of the Unitarian doctrine, was printed in Liverpool in 1816 without his knowledge, and reprinted in Boston and also in Worcester the next year. In 1824, a volume of his sermons was issued, with a memoir by his successor at the New South church, the Rev. F. W. P. Greenwood.
