= Boston Society for the Diffusion of Useful Knowledge =

Educational society, founded 1829

The Boston Society for the Diffusion of Useful Knowledge (est. 1829) in Boston, Massachusetts, was founded "to promote and direct popular education by lectures and other means." Modelled after the recently formed Society for the Diffusion of Useful Knowledge in London, the Boston group's officers included Daniel Webster, Nathan Hale, Jacob Bigelow, William Ellery Channing, Edward Everett, Nathaniel L. Frothingham, and Abbott Lawrence. The society published the American Library of Useful Knowledge, a series of scholarly works by British and American authors. Public lectures on a variety of topics were held at Boston's Masonic Temple, and other venues.

== History ==
In 1829 the founders explained their reasons for creating the society:

"From infancy to the age of seventeen, the means provided in this city by public munificence and private enterprise, are ample. From seventeen to the age when young men enter on the more active and responsible duties of their several stations, sufficient opportunity does not appear to be afforded for mental and moral cultivation. At this period of life, when the mind is active and the passions urgent, and when the invitations to profitless amusements are strongest and most numerous, it is desirable that means should be provided for furnishing at a cheap rate, and in an inviting form, such useful information as will not only add to the general intelligence of the young men referred to, but at the same time will prepare them to engage more understandingly, with a deeper interest, and with better prospect of success, in the pursuits to which their lives are to be devoted.
The existing deficiency of such means is clearly a subject of regret; and the undersigned are of opinion that this deficiency may be most easily and fully supplied by courses of Lectures delivered in different parts of the city, under the auspices of a Society, whose sanction may secure to the Lecturers employed, the confidence and resort of the public. It is proposed that the first courses of Lectures should be given to those who are engaged in Trade and Commerce; and that they should include the subjects of Universal Geography and Statistics, and of the Moral, Natural, Political, and Legal Sciences, so far as they may be connected with commercial transactions."

Thus each year the society arranged several public lectures on substantial themes, delivered by substantial thinkers such as Horace Mann, George Bancroft and Ralph Waldo Emerson. Among the lecture attendees was Caroline Healey Dall.

In addition, as part of the society's effort to improve the minds of its members, it published a reading list. The short list of titles "recommended to those members of the Society, who may seek any direction as to the matter and the course of their reading" consisted of:

- David Hume's History of England
- Walter Scott's History of Scotland
- William Robertson's History of America
- John Marshall's History of the American Colonies
- Thomas Hutchinson's, George Richards Minot's and Alden Bradford's Histories of Massachusetts
- Caleb Snow's History of Boston
- William Gordon's American Revolution
- Henry Lee's Southern Campaigns
- John Marshall's Life of Washington
- Washington Irving's A History of the Life and Voyages of Christopher Columbus
- Life of Franklin, James Otis, Patrick Henry, Josiah Quincy, Fulton, the Signers of the Declaration of Independence
- 1st vol. of Malte Brun's Geography
- Timothy Flint's Valley of the Mississippi
- William Paley's Natural Theology
- John Mason Good's Book of Nature
- Jane Marcet's Conversations on Vegetable Physiology and Elements of Botany
- Isaac Ray's Conversations on Animal Economy
- Stewart's and Thomas Brown's Philosophy of the Mind
- Neil Arnott's Elements of Physicks
- Jacob Bigelow's Technology
- William Paley's Moral Philosophy
- Adam Ferguson on Civil Society
- William Blackstone's Commentaries on the Laws of England
- 1st vol. of James Kent's Commentaries on American Law
- Works of Alexander Hamilton
- Alexander Hill Everett's Europe and America
- Jean-Baptiste Say's Political Economy
- Willard Phillips on Insurance

The society also donated money for purchase of books to Boston's Mercantile Library Association and the Mechanic Apprentices Library Association.

== Lectures ==
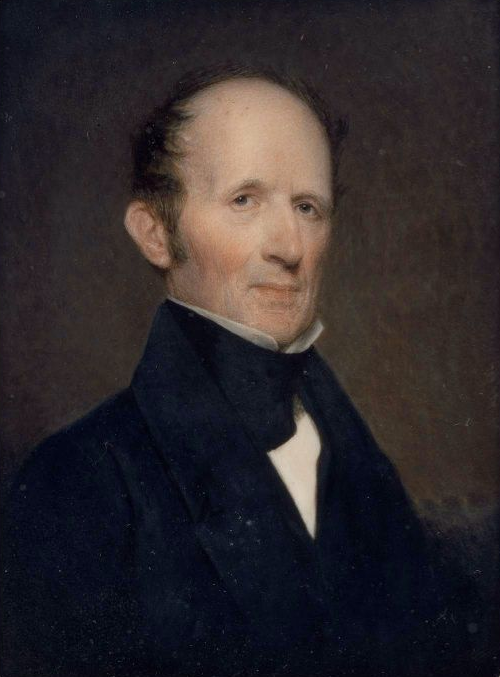
Portrait of lecturer John Pickering, by Alvan Clark (Museum of Fine Arts, Boston)

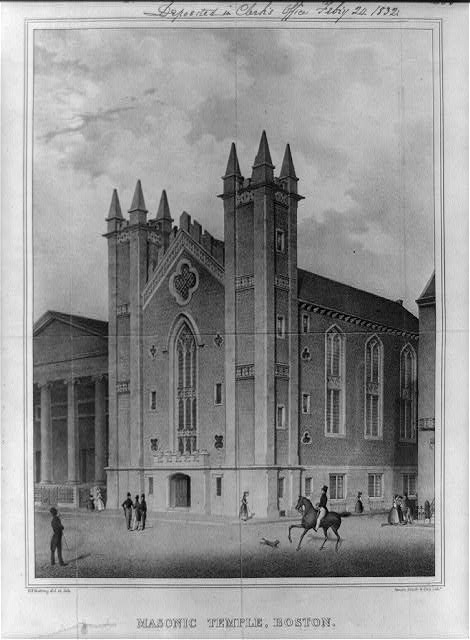
Masonic Temple, Tremont St., Boston, 1830s; engraving by Annin & Smith. Many of the society's lectures took place here

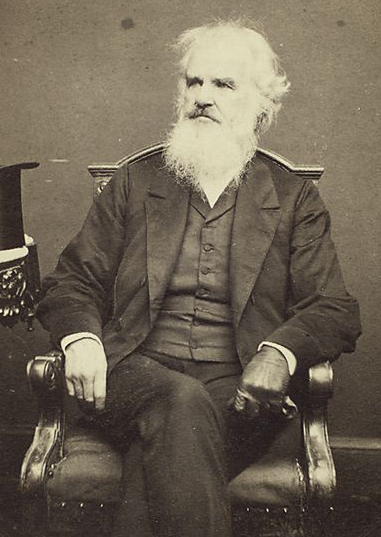
Portrait of lecturer John Pierpont

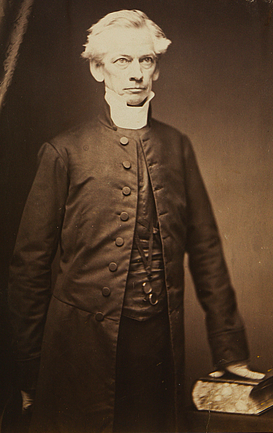
Portrait of lecturer Alonzo Potter

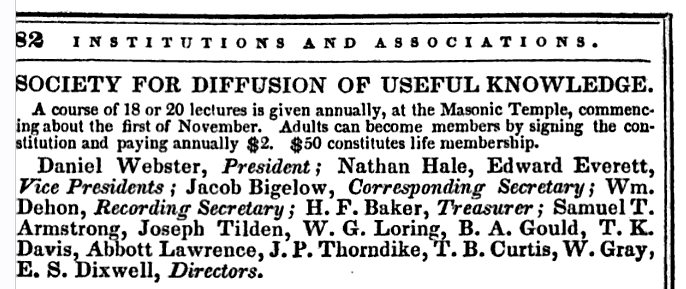
Boston Almanac listing for the society, 1838

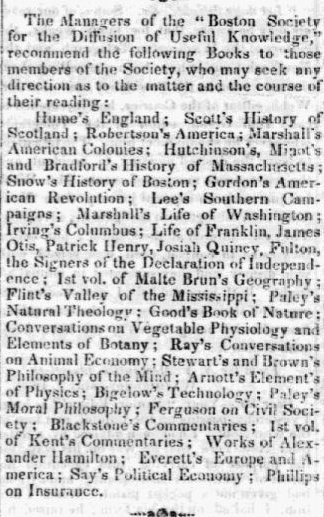
Reading list of the society, 1830

- 1829
  - Edward Everett: "The Biography of Franklin"
  - Walter Channing: "On Physical Education, Including the History of the Ancient Gymnasium;" "On the Means of Promoting and Preserving the Health of Communities, and the History and Operation of Quarantine Law;" "Aqueducts or the Means and Advantages of Supplying Cities with Water"
  - Francis Lieber: "Causes of the Decline of the Turkish Empire"
  - Chandler Robbins, M.D.: "Animal Mechanics"
- 1830
  - Alexander H. Everett: "The History of Civilization"
  - Alonzo Potter: "The Theory of Morals"
  - John Park: "On Sensation, the Source of Knowledge and the Means by Which Truth May Be Ascertained"
  - William Sullivan: "The Constancy of Human Nature Illustrated by the Physical and Moral Character of War in the Past Ages"
  - John Pickering: "Uncertainty of the Law"; "The Moral Sciences and Belles Lettres as Branches of Useful Knowledge"
  - Davis: "On Natural Sciences"
  - F.W.P. Greenwood: "The Nature and Power of Moral Circumstances"; "On the Uses and Abuses of Books"
  - James T. Austin: "On the Modern History of Massachusetts"
  - John Pierpont: "On the Value of Human Knowledge"
  - William J. Loring: "An Exposition on Some of the Elementary Principles of Political Economy"
  - Theodore Lyman: "Remarks on the Principal Events of the French Revolution of 1789"
- 1831
  - Benjamin A. Gould: "On Switzerland-the Glaciers-and Other Phenomena of the Alps, together with Passes over those Mountains"
  - J. V. C. Smith: "On the Natural History and Cultivation of the Honey Bee, as a Source of Domestic Economy"
  - Enoch Hale: "On Nutrition and on Digestion"
  - J. Greely Stevenson: "On the Varieties of Man"
  - John C. Gray: "On Taxation and Revenue"
  - Lemuel Shaw: "On Laws of Property"
  - Daniel Webster: "Introductory Lecture"
  - Jacob Bigelow: "The Cemetery at Mount Auburn"; "Architecture"
  - Francis C. Gray: "The Aborigines of America"; "Some Peculiarities of the American Form of Government"
- 1832
  - Chandler Robbins: Health
  - Gamaliel Bradford: "Apparitions"; "The Organs of Motion"
  - Franklin Dexter: "The Moral Right of Parties to Suit at Law"
  - J. Greely Stevenson: "The Cause of Diversities of Complexion and Figure in Mankind"
  - Charles P. Curtis: "The Benefit to the Public from the Establishment of a Court of Chancery in Massachusetts"
  - Enoch Hale: "Dews and Clouds"
  - John Farrar: "Natural Philosophy"
  - Abraham Mason: "The Art of Wood Engraving"
- 1833
  - John Pickering: "The Importance of the Study of Languages"; "Language Comprehending an Account of the Written Language of Ancient Egypt, Called Hieroglyphics, as Explained by Dr. Young and M. Champollion"; "Mexican and Peruvian Languages-and Telegraphic Languages"
  - Jonathan Barber: "Elocution"
  - Edward Everett: "Introductory Lecture"
  - George Ticknor: Shakespeare
- 1834
  - John Farrar: Astronomy
  - Caleb Cushing: "Man as the Agent and Object of Civilization"; "Moral and Intellectual Culture"; "Analysis of Social Organizations"; "Government"; "On Civilization and Social State of Christendom"; "The Fine Arts"
- 1835
  - Caleb Cushing: "Woman"; "The Discovery and Colonization of America"
  - Ralph Waldo Emerson: "Michel Angelo Buonarte"; "Martin Luther"; "John Milton"; "George Fox"; "The Biography of Edmund Burke"; English Literature; "Permanent Traits of the English National Genius"; "The Age of Fable"; "Chaucer"; "Shakespeare"; "Lord Bacon"; "Ben Jonson, Herrick, Herbert, and Wotton"
- 1836
  - Ralph Waldo Emerson: "Ethical Writers"; "Modern Aspects of Letters"
  - John Farrar: Astronomy
  - Daniel Webster: "The Progress of Popular Knowledge"
  - Theophilus Parsons: "The Progress and Prospects of Society"
  - John C. Gray: "The Forest Trees of the United States"
  - Rufus Choate: "The Literature of the Sea"
- 1837
  - William Sullivan
  - Alexander Young: "The Pequot War of 1637"
  - Charles W. Upham: "Roger Williams"; "Hugh Peters"; "Sir George Downing"; "The British Navigation Act of 1651"
  - Edward Everett: "Introductory Lecture"
  - William H. Gardiner: "Ancient Mexico"
  - George Putnam: "The Circuit of the Waters"
  - Edward T. Channing: "Modern Demonstrative Eloquence"; "Mental Habits of Writers"
- 1838
  - Edward T. Channing: "Richard Steele and the Periodical Essays of Queen Anne's Time"; "Literary Decisions"; "The Education of an Orator"
  - James Walker: "The Progress of Civilization as Affected by Systems of Philosophy"; "Materialism"; "Transcendentalism"; "Phrenology"; "Animal Magnetism"
  - Horace Mann: "Education-Its Necessity"; "Education-Its Processes"; "Education-Its Objects"
  - Jared Sparks: American Revolution
- 1839
  - William Adam: "India"
  - Francis C. Gray: English Language and Literature
  - Orville Dewey: "The Moral Philosophy of Human Life"; "The Moral Philosophy of History"
- 1840
  - Convers Francis: "The Relation of Literature to the Time"; "The Interpretation of the Past"; "The Huguenots in America"
  - John Brazer: "The Difference between English and Ancient Classical Poetry"
  - John Quincy Adams: "The Social Nature of Man and Its Influence upon the Moral Condition"
  - William H. Simmons: "The British Poets"; "The Poetry of Milton"; "Cowper and the Satirical Poets"; "The Poetry of Byron"'
  - Henry R. Cleveland: "Characters of Classical and Romantic Fiction"
- 1841
  - Charles Francis Adams: "Shakespeare""
  - John Quincy Adams: "The Chinese War"
  - Henry W. Bellows: "The Formation of Opinions"
  - John S. Dwight: "The Musical Life"
  - Henry Giles: "The Poet Burns"; "The Poet Crabbe"
  - Frederic Henry Hedge: "The Philosophy of Literature"
  - William Mitchell: Astronomy
  - John Lord: "Institutions of the Middle Ages"
- 1842
  - George Bancroft: "American Independence: A Consequence of the Reformation-Mayhew"; "The French War, A War of Revolution"; "Increase of Despotic Power in the European World"; "Boston in 1765"
  - Charles Eames: "The Spirit of American History"; "The Commercial System"; "The Unity and Result of Ancient History"
  - Henry Giles: "Elements and Illustration of Irish Character"; "Byron"
  - Francis C. Gray: "Shakespeare"
  - Oliver Wendell Holmes: "Astrology and Alchemy"; "Medical Delusions of the Past"; "Homeopathy"
  - Ephraim Peabody: "The British Power in India"
  - Josiah Quincy: "Introductory Lecture"
- 1843
  - Richard Henry Dana Jr.: "The Foundation of Influence"; "American Loyalty"
  - E. T. Fitch: "Music as Fine Art"
  - Edward Reynolds: Human anatomy
  - Thaddeus W. Harris: "Zoology"
- 1847
  - Louis Agassiz: "The Alps and Glaciers"

== See also ==
- Society for the Diffusion of Useful Knowledge, London (est.1826)
