= Colonial American astronomy =

Colonial American astronomy can be traced to the time when the English began colonizing in the New World during the 16th century. They brought with them their interest in astronomy. At first, astronomical thought in America was based on Aristotelian philosophy.

== England's expedition to the Outer Banks ==
During a British expedition to North Carolina's Outer Banks in the 1580s, astronomer and mathematician Thomas Harriot looked to the stars to determine why many of the natives that came in contact with the Europeans had died mysteriously. He determined that it was not the solar eclipse that he observed on their voyage to the new world nor the comet that appeared during his time on the island. His 1588 Briefe and True Report of the New Found Land of Virginia hints that instead of finding the answer in the heavens, it was the cruel treatment of the English toward the natives. He also mentioned a "perspective glass whereby we shewed manie strange sights." This was most likely a magnifying lens. Harriot later became one of the first users of the telescope after returning to England and rendered a drawing of the moon four months before Galileo.

== Harvard College and astronomy ==
In the Massachusetts Bay Colony, during the Puritan migration, a seminary of learning was established in 1636 known as New Cambridge. Many of its tutors came from Oxford and Cambridge Universities in England. New Cambridge, like its English predecessors, was saturated in Aristotelian metaphysics and logic. In 1639, it became known as Harvard College. The first president of Harvard and lone instructor for a period, Henry Dunster, taught his students the "astronomy of the ancients". The Earth was the center of the universe while nine transparent spherical orbs revolved around it.

Based on very meager information, Thomas Jefferson Wertenbaker suggests in The First Americans that Copernican astronomy, although not taught formally until later, started to emerge at Harvard College in 1670. In 1671 a physics class refused to read an assigned text that supported the Ptolemaic system. However, as early as 1659, one Harvard graduate, Zachariah Brigden, began to promote the new astronomy in the New England almanacs. Most astrological information came to the people by way of these almanacs.

== Astronomical almanacs ==
Interest in astronomy was evident as early as 1638 with the initiation of the first American printing press at Harvard College. In 1639, Stephen Daye began to print in Cambridge, Massachusetts, the first series of almanacs published in the Thirteen American Colonies, An Almanack Calculated for New England, by William Pierce. During the seventeenth century, astronomical almanacs began to appear in the American colonies, especially New England. These almanacs contained phases of the moon, tide tables, best times to plant, and the setting of religious holidays. They also contained pieces on the celestial sphere.

The Puritans believed that God was a great geometer and He revealed himself through mathematics which propagated His intricately rational plan. This scientific doctrine of the Puritans was an "assertion that the cultivated mind... is competent to gather accurate knowledge of things... because the mind is fundamentally commensurate with creation." This way of thinking encouraged New England almanac writers to accept the new astronomy. New England almanacs were compiled by young Harvard graduates who used them as a vehicle for popular essays on Copernican astronomy. This included, Zachariah Brigden from Connecticut, who wrote about the revolution of the six planets around the sun, the four satellites around Jupiter and the two satellites around Saturn in The New England Almanack of the Coelestial Motions for this Present Year of the Christian AEra 1659. Brigden had access to English almanac-maker and astronomer Vincent Wing's 1656 Astronomia Instraurata. Wing was the first to put the discoveries of Copernicus, Galileo, and Kepler into English. He published astronomical tables that made predicting eclipses more accessible.

Brigden opens the almanac with a quote from Wing "Twice shall this planet wheron we live, and it’s concomitant the moon, widdow each other of their Sun-derived luster." He ends the almanac with a short concise account of the Copernican system. This was most likely the first scientific essay written in the American colony.

One thing that remained in the Ptolemaic system for Brigden was the sphere of the fixed stars. There was also an uneasiness regarding the Bible as a barrier to the Copernican system. A copy of this almanac was sent to the Puritan clergy John Davenport of New Haven by John Winthrop the Younger. Davenport responded with a letter to Winthrop stating that although he does not agree with Brigden, he entitled Brigden to his opinion. Davenport showed lenience by not putting him on the Puritan index expurgatorius or expelling his membership from the church.

In the 1661 almanac, Harvard graduate Samuel Cheever, printed theories from Galileo, Boulliau, Gassendi, and Kepler and promoted the Copernican hypotheses. Harvard graduate, Thomas Brattle prepared An Almanack of Coelestial Motions of the Sun and Planets with their Principal Aspects for the year 1678, with work arranged in advance making it evident that Brattle "prepared his dissertation by computing the elements necessary to solar and planetary data."

These very rare booklets reveal the astronomical information that was held by the colonists' intellectual class. They also contained practical information such as the rising and setting of the sun and moon, guiding the scholar and the mariner, location of the planets and stars in conjunction and opposition, and providing longitude and latitude. The almanacs correctly predicted eclipses of the sun and moon, and provided an abundance of meteorological and historical data. Often found on the final pages of the almanac were brief articles that promoted the new astronomy.

== Royal Society Fellows in colonial America ==
In England the Royal Society was paving the way for new scientific thought which in turn reached its American colonies. The Royal Society fashioned its reputation by vigilantly developing and maintaining its membership as an assembly of gentlemen. "The reliable witnessing of experiments by gentlemen was the only sure way to establish matters of fact about the physical realm." With a list of members in the Society that included eighteen Americans, it is obvious that the Royal Society had a major influence in scientific development in the colonies in a variety of fields. The Royal Society encouraged their Fellows to participate in the scientific process by asking them to record the weather and share astronomical observations as well as any other events of scientific interest. John Winthrop the Younger, son of the first Massachusetts governor, John Winthrop, was among the original members.

Winthrop was temporarily residing in London when he was elected in 1663 as the first colonist elected Fellow and western correspondent. He was a man of great learning with an education in law who also mastered most of the new sciences. Winthrop's collection of books he brought back to America was remarkable. He is credited as being the first chemist and metallurgist in the American colonies while he practiced alchemy and medicine.

Winthrop also studied astronomy with his 3 1/2 foot refracting telescope. In 1664, he wrote a letter to Sir Robert Moray regarding a "fifth satellite of Jupiter" that he believed he observed. This was only fifty years after Galileo discovered the first four moons of Jupiter. His letter was cautious since he thought it may be a faint star close to the other satellites. Winthrop requested that his observations be validated by Lawrence Rooke, Professor of Astronomy at Gresham College, but nothing was verified. Dr. Edward Emerson Barnard, who was credited for discovering Amalthea, Jupiter's fifth moon, wrote "It makes me feel specially humiliated just now, for I have only caught the feeblest glimpses of the 5th satellite with the 40-inch during the past two years. Winthrop’s telescope must have been specially good for him to see this faint object with his imperfect instrument in 1664." Although today it is assumed that Winthrop probably did see a faint star, he is still credited for being a dedicated and vigilant observer of natural phenomenon.

"An exceptionally talented Puritan intellectual whose work in mathematics and astronomy was sought after by the scientific elite on both sides of the Atlantic" describes Royal Society Fellow Thomas Brattle who devoted much of his wealth to the pursuit of science. Not only did Brattle prepare almanacs, he also made celestial observations. For his keen observation of the Comet of 1680, Brattle was given a favorable mention in Sir Isaac Newton's Principia. He also speculated, independently of John Flamsteed, that even though the comet appeared to be two, it was a single comet that changed direction. His observation of a solar eclipse in 1694 was published in Philosophical Transactions of the Royal Society.

John Winthrop, grandson to John Winthrop the Younger, became a Fellow of the Royal Society in 1734. He collected geological specimens and demonstrated skills in classification and cataloging. In the area of astronomy, Winthrop observed the 1761 transit of Venus in St. John's, Newfoundland. His observations and recorded data were published in Philosophical Transactions of the Royal Society.

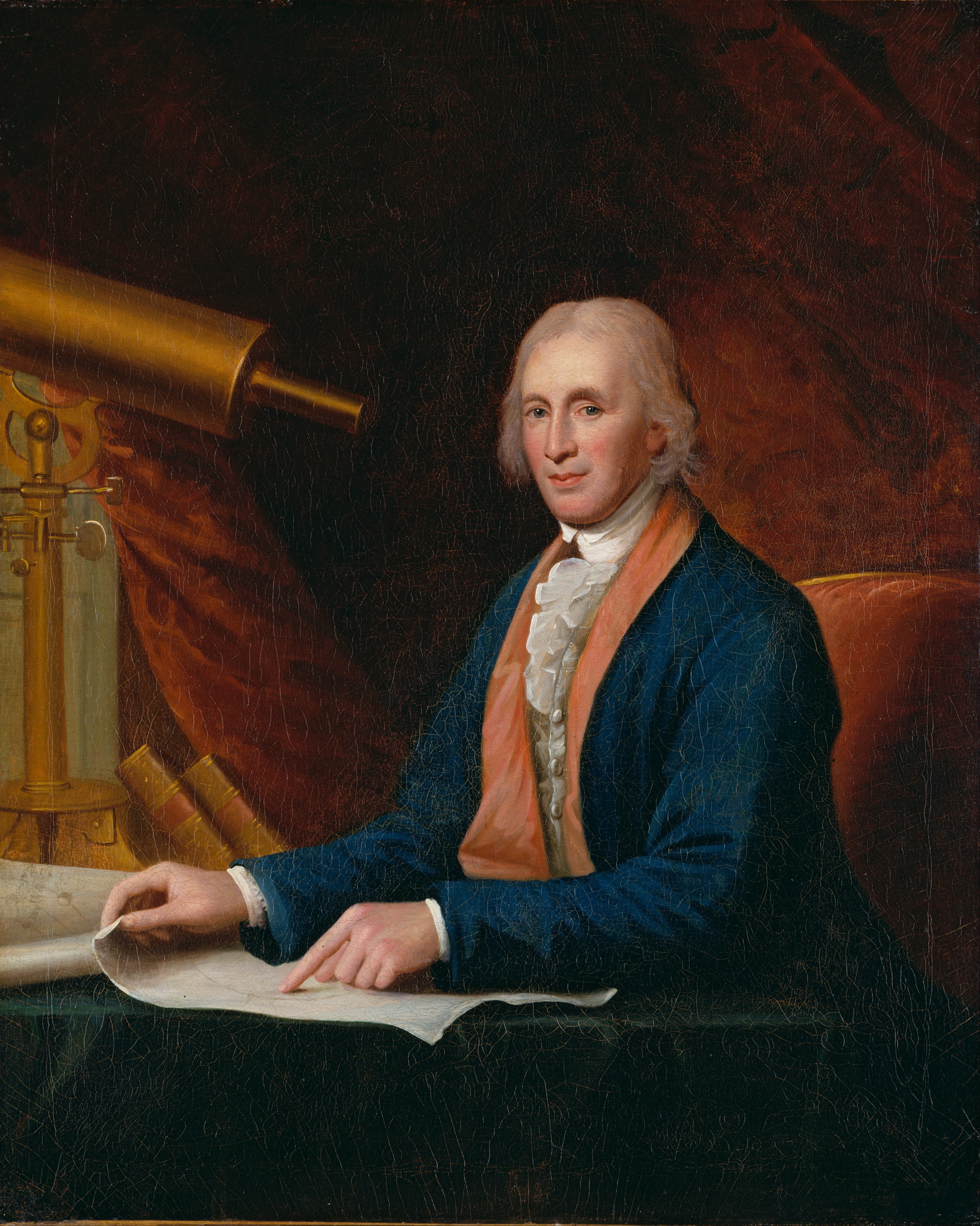
^{National Portrait Gallery} 1796 portrait of David Rittenhouse by Charles Willson Peale

Royal Society Fellow and an original member of the American Philosophical Society founded in 1741, David Rittenhouse, not only mastered Newton’s Principia as a teenager, he built clocks, orreries, and other scientific devices. It is believed that he built the first telescope and observatory in America. It was in this observatory on his farm that Rittenhouse observed the 1769 Venus Transit. His account was published in the American Philosophical Society's Transactions.

== The ‘Puritan and Science’ thesis ==
In her article Puritanism and the New Philosophy in 17th Century England (1935), Dorothy Stimson argued that the primary ingredient in the philosophical changes started by Francis Bacon was Puritanism. This argument was supported in Ancients and Moderns (1936) by Richard Foster Jones and ‘Puritanism, Pietism and Science’ (1938) by Robert K. Merton. Merton noted that there was a disproportional number of Puritan Fellows in the Royal Society compared to the English population. He also summoned the thesis of Max Weber connecting "the Protestant work ethic" with the rise of capitalism. The argument was that scientific pursuits were a type of "good work" and therefore a sign of election. "This-worldly asceticism which inspired Puritans to greater economic activity also motivated them to diligent and painstaking scientific enquiry." In 1975, Charles Webster builds on the argument in The Great Instauration: Science, Medicine and Reform, 1626-1660, claiming that the prevailing factor in English society in the mid-1600s was Puritanism and its relationship with the growth of the English scientific movement was extremely close. A longing to discern the universe's composition and reveal the force of the "Great Geometer" provided a sense of wonder at the universe's immensity and intricacy. Exploring "God’s great mechanism" was the perfect "good work" for the Puritan.
