= Samuel Kirkland Lothrop (clergyman) =

American clergyman (1804–1886)

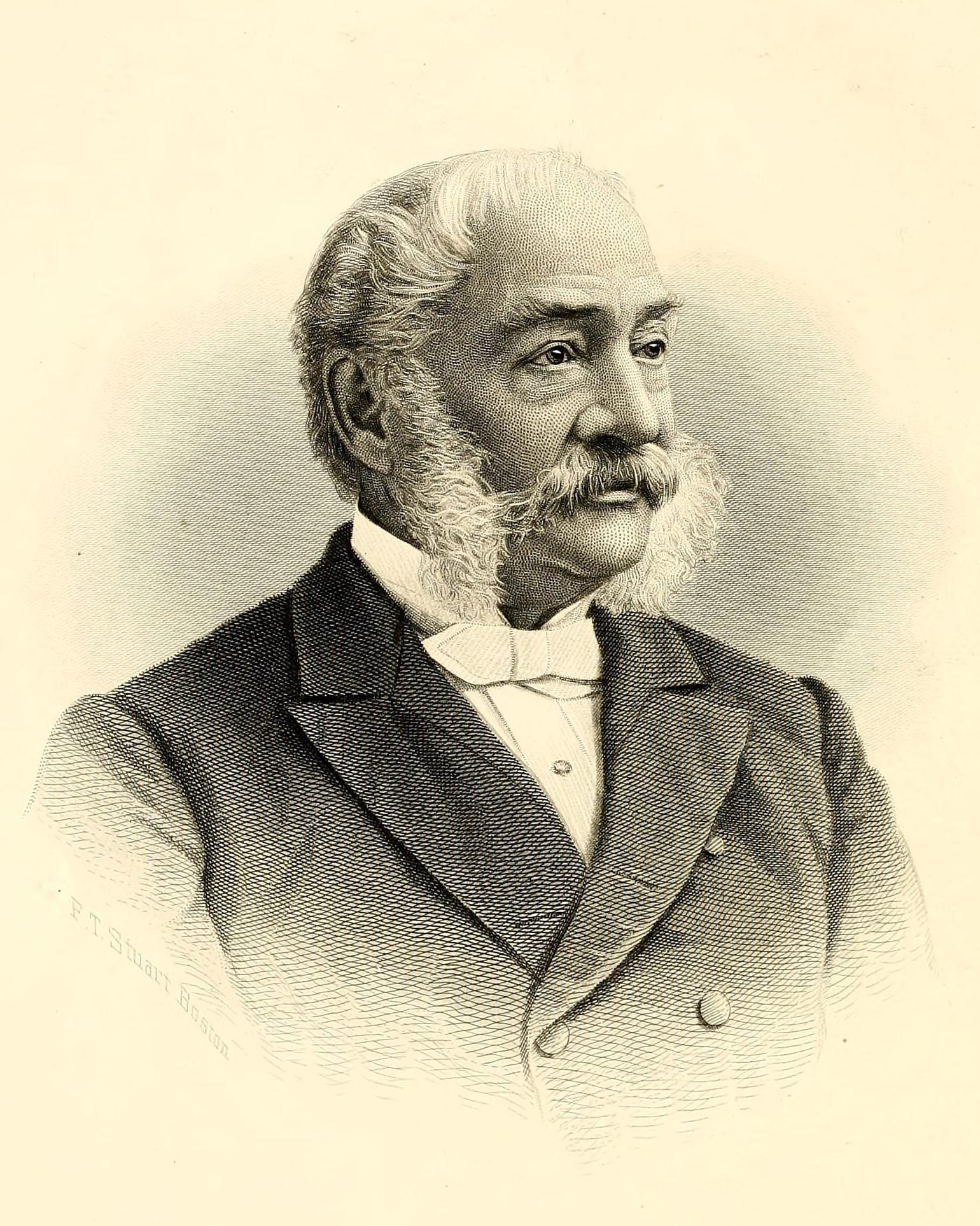
Samuel Kirkland Lothrop

Samuel Kirkland Lothrop (born in Utica, New York, 13 October 1804; died in Boston, Massachusetts, 12 June 1886) was an American clergyman. He was graduated at Harvard in 1825, and at the Harvard Divinity School in 1828. In 1829, he was ordained pastor of the Unitarian church in Dover, New Hampshire, and on 17 June 1834, took charge of the Brattle Square Church in Boston, Massachusetts. The degree of D.D. was conferred on him by Harvard in 1852. He was a delegate to the state constitutional convention of 1853. His society moved to a new building in 1873, but dissolved in 1876, when Lothrop resigned the pastorate. He was a member of the Boston School Committee for 30 years, and chairman of its committee on the English high school for 26. Among his literary works are a life of his grandfather, Samuel Kirkland, included in Jared Sparks' American Biography, and a History of Brattle Square Church. His grandmother was Jerusha Bingham Kirkland.
