= Alexander Young (historian) =

- Born: September 22, 1800; Boston, Massachusetts
- Died: March 16, 1854 (aged 53); Boston, Massachusetts
- Education: Harvard University (Grad. 1820; D.D. 1846)

Alexander Young was an American historian and Unitarian minister. He is most notable for publishing Chronicles of the Pilgrim Fathers, in which he is the first to label the 1621 harvest feast between the Wampanoag and the Pilgrims as the "first Thanksgiving."

== Life ==
Young was born on September 22, 1800 in Boston, Massachusetts, the son of Alexander Young. His father had co-founded the Massachusetts Chronicle, a Federalist newspaper. Young graduated Harvard University in 1820 and graduated from Harvard Divinity School in 1824. Young spent a year teaching at Boston Latin School before being ordained as the minister of Bostons New South Church (Unitarian). Young was made a member of Harvard's Board of Overseers and was corresponding secretary of the Massachusetts Historical Society from 1849 to 1854. Young died in Boston on March 10, 1854.

== Works ==
- A Discourse On The Life And Character Of The Hon. Nathaniel Bowditch (1838)
- A Discourse on the Life and Character of the Reverend John Thornton Kirkland (1840)
- Chronicles of the Pilgrim Fathers of the Colony of Plymouth, From 1602 to 1625 (1841)
- A Discourse Occasioned by the Death of the Hon. William Prescott (1844)
- Chronicles of the First Planters of the Colony of Massachusetts Bay, From 1623 to 1636 (1846)
