= Jerusha Bingham Kirkland =

- Born: Jerusha Bingham; October 15, 1743; Windham, Connecticut, U.S.
- Died: January 23, 1788 (aged 44); Clinton, Oneida County, New York, U.S.
- Other name: Jemima Bingham
- Occupation: missionary
- Spouse: Samuel Kirkland (m. 1769)
- Children: John Thornton Kirkland
- Relatives: Samuel Kirkland Lothrop (grandson); Eleazar Wheelock (uncle)

Jerusha Bingham Kirkland (October 15, 1743 – January 23, 1788) was a prominent colonial American pioneer in the missionary cause. During the years of her residence and labors among the Oneida people, where she and her husband, Rev. Dr. Samuel Kirkland, brought about many conversions to Christianity, Mrs. Kirkland was noted for her kind deeds as a nurse and medical benefactor to the Native Americans. Both she and her husband gained a wide influence among the indigenous people of the region, many of whom they were afterwards and during the American Revolutionary War, able to win over to the colonialist cause.

== Early life ==
Jerusha (sometimes referred to as "Jemima") Bingham, (Note: Logan (1912) confuses her as two different women. The biography of "Jerusha Bingham Kirkland" is on page 516. The biography of "Jemima Bingham" is on page 510.) (Note: Fowler (1876) also refers to her as "Jemima".) was born in Windham, Connecticut, October 15, 1743. Her parents were Joseph Bingham of Windham, and Sarah Wheelock, (Note: Young (1840) attempts to furnish a record of John Thornton Kirkland's descent from Miles Standish, by stating, in part, that Jerusha Bingham was the daughter of Mary Wheelock, whose mother's name was Mercy Standish. This is rebuked by Weaver (1860).) sister to Rev. Eleazar Wheelock, D. D., a successful laborer in missionary work among Indigenous Americans. Kirkland came of a devout Christian family, and was reared amid the privileges of her Connecticut home.

== Career ==
In Connecticut, in 1769, she married Rev. Dr. Samuel Kirkland a missionary who had who had begun work among the Oneida. Shortly after their marriage, she accompanied him to his post near Fort Stanwix, where Rome, New York, is now situated. The area was on the frontier, in dense forest inhabited by several Native American tribes. Their home, near the Oneida "Council House," stood in the forest. There, the couple began their missionary work. She continued the work despite the dangers.

Prior to his marriage, Rev. Kirkland made his home and pursued his missionary labors at the "Council House"; after a house had been prepared for Mrs. Kirkland, he still continued to preach and teach at the "Council House", addressing the Native Americans in their own language, which both he and his wife had acquired.

In 1772, Rev. Kirkland purchased a small homestead in Stockbridge, Massachusetts, for Mrs. Kirkland and their children.

Mrs. Kirkland visited the wigwams and instructed the women and children, who in turn flocked to her forest house. The women and children of the tribe were her chosen pupils. Seated in circles on the greensward beneath the spreading arches of giant oaks and maples, they listened to her teachings. She taught the women and children and by her example and patient work brought about a changed condition among these people. She prayed for them in the Oneida language.

Mrs. Kirkland and her husband were recommended by the Continental Congress as having adapted to labor among the Native Americans, and able to preserve their neutrality toward the Revolutionary War. During the period when the early wars threatened the destruction of the new nation by the Native Americans, she worked faithfully with her husband in that arduous and responsible work of pacification.

== Personal life ==
In the midst of her missionary labors, she was also a wife and mother of eleven children.

- twins, George Whitfield Kirkland (1770–1806) and John Thornton Kirkland (1770–1840)
- Mary Kirkland (1772–1772)
- Sarah Kirkland (1774–1828)
- Jerusha (Kirkland) Lothrop (1776–1862)
- Elizabeth Kirkland (1779–1779)
- Julia Kirkland (1781–1861)
- Samuel Kirkland (1782–1805)
- Joseph Kirkland (1783–1872)
- Eliza Kirkland (1784–1819)
- Timothy Kirkland (1785–1785)

The twins, George and John, were born at Herkimer, New York, August 17, 1770. When John achieved national prominence as president of Harvard College, his biographer wrote, “It was from a mother of distinguished public spirit, energy, wisdom and devotedness that he received the rudiments of his high intellectual and manly resolutions.”

Daughter Jerusha was the mother of the clergyman, Samuel Kirkland Lothrop.

Jerusha Bingham Kirkland died in Clinton, Oneida County, New York, January 23, 1788.
