= Massachusetts Charitable Mechanic Association =

American charitable organization

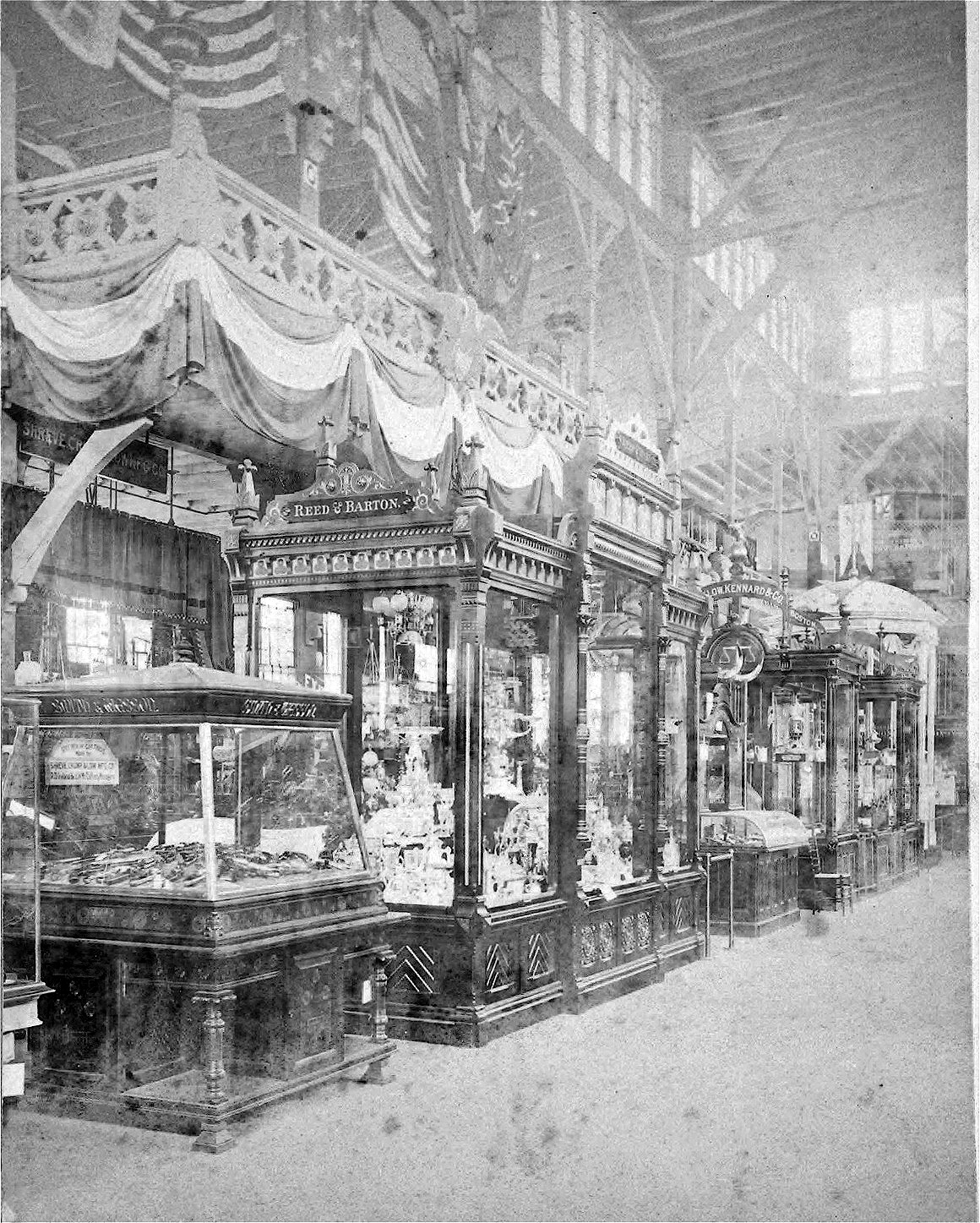
13th MCMA exhibit, Park Square, Boston, 1878

The Massachusetts Charitable Mechanic Association (est.1795) of Boston, Massachusetts, was "formed for the sole purposes of promoting the mechanic arts and extending the practice of benevolence." Founders included Paul Revere, Jonathan Hunnewell, and Benjamin Russell. Through much of the 19th century, the association organized conferences and exhibitions devoted to innovation in the mechanical arts.

== History ==
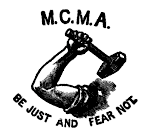

The group first met in 1795 at the Green Dragon Tavern. Paul Revere acted as chairman. Subsequent meetings took place at Concert Hall and elsewhere. The group officially incorporated in 1806. Its constitution proclaimed:

"It is universally admitted that the combined operation of the mechanic powers hath been the source of those useful inventions and scientific arts, which have given to polished society its wealth, conveniences, respectability, and defence, and which have ameliorated the condition of its citizens. Rational, therefore, is the inference, that the association of those who conduct those powers will prove highly beneficial to them, by promoting mutual good offices and fellowship; -- by assisting the necessitous; -- encouraging the ingenious; -- and rewarding the faithful."

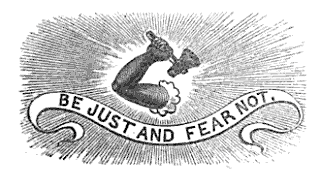

Founding members included tailors, hatters, hairdressers, bakers, blacksmiths, whitesmiths, goldsmiths, watchmakers, coopers, engine-builders, painters, printers, bookbinders, booksellers, curriers, shipwrights, riggers, sailmakers, ropemakers, cabinet-makers, housewrights, masons, bricklayers, paint-sellers, saddlers, farriers, furriers, cordwainers, silk-dyers. Among the first members were Paul Revere and Paul Revere, Jr., goldsmiths; Benjamin Russell, printer; David West, bookseller; Samuel Perkins, painter; Ephraim Thayer, engine-builder; Jedediah Lincoln, housewright; Edmund Hartt, shipwright; Samuel Gore, painter; and several dozen others. Later members included Joseph T. Buckingham, Alexander Parris and Thomas Waldron Sumner.

=== Festivals & exhibitions ===
Beginning in 1809 the association held "Triennial Festivals" which continued through the 19th century. The festivals alternated venues, sometimes taking place in Faneuil Hall, sometimes in the Music Hall, and elsewhere. From 1837, the association organized large exhibitions of mechanical innovations and related curiosities. The exhibitions, which took place every two years, were held in large indoor spaces such as Quincy Hall.

=== Library ===
In 1820, William Wood established a library that continued under the supervision of the main body of the association until 1828, when the newly formed Mechanic Apprentices Library Association took over. The Apprentices Library then operated for several decades thereafter. In 1892 the library ceased; its collections were "distributed throughout repositories in Boston.

=== Other activities ===
Throughout its history the association collected and distributed charitable funds to the needy.

During the early 19th century the association promoted efforts to expand educational opportunities for apprentices and other boys. One outcome was the establishment in 1821 of the first public high school in America, the English High School of Boston (originally the English Classical School). A number of prominent members of the association served on the school committee that created English High School. The school was also modeled after a similar effort by the mechanics of Edinburgh, Scotland.

It also ran "an evening school in the mechanical arts" 1820-1859. "In 1900 the first classes of the MCMA Trade School began. The Trade School provided classes in electrical wiring, drafting, and carpentry, among many others. During World War I, the enrollment dropped substantially and the school closed in 1917. Following this closure the MCMA promoted classes held at the Wentworth Institute of Technology in Boston."

Beginning in the late 1840s the association "invested in the Revere Hotel."

=== Buildings ===
Around the 1860s and 1870s the association's Mechanics Hall was located at Bedford Street and Chauncy Street. A new Mechanics Hall was constructed for the association in 1881 on Huntington Avenue, at West Newton Street near Copley Square. Architect William Gibbons Preston designed it. Like its predecessor, the new Mechanics Building featured an auditorium, sometimes referred to as the Grand Hall. The building was demolished in 1959. By 1988 the association conducted its business from quarters in Quincy, Massachusetts.

== See also ==
- Mechanics Hall (Boston, Massachusetts), Huntington Ave.

== Image gallery ==
MCMA exhibitions

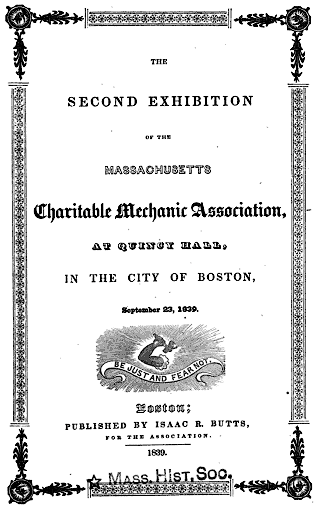
1839

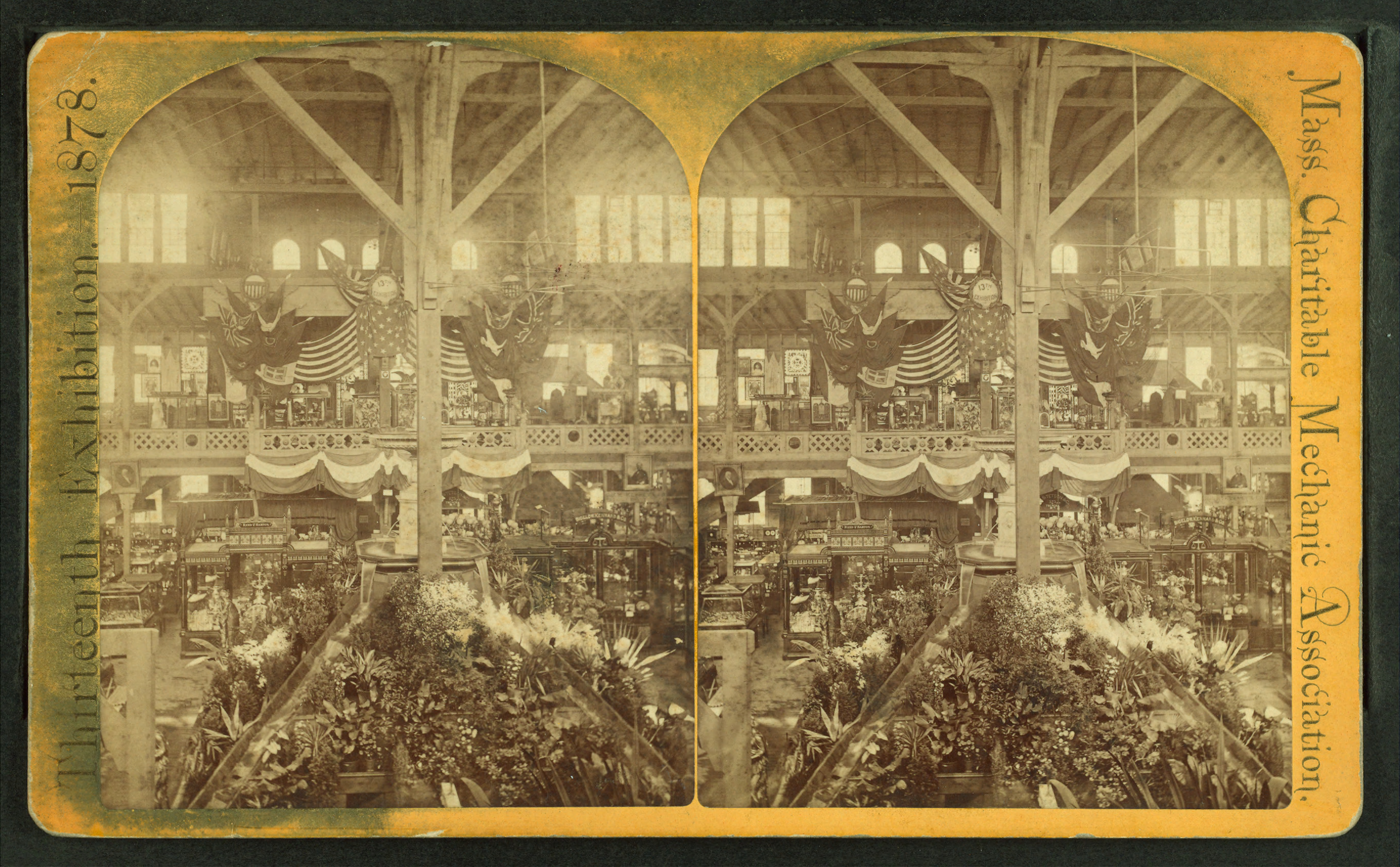
13th MCMA exhibit, Park Square, 1878

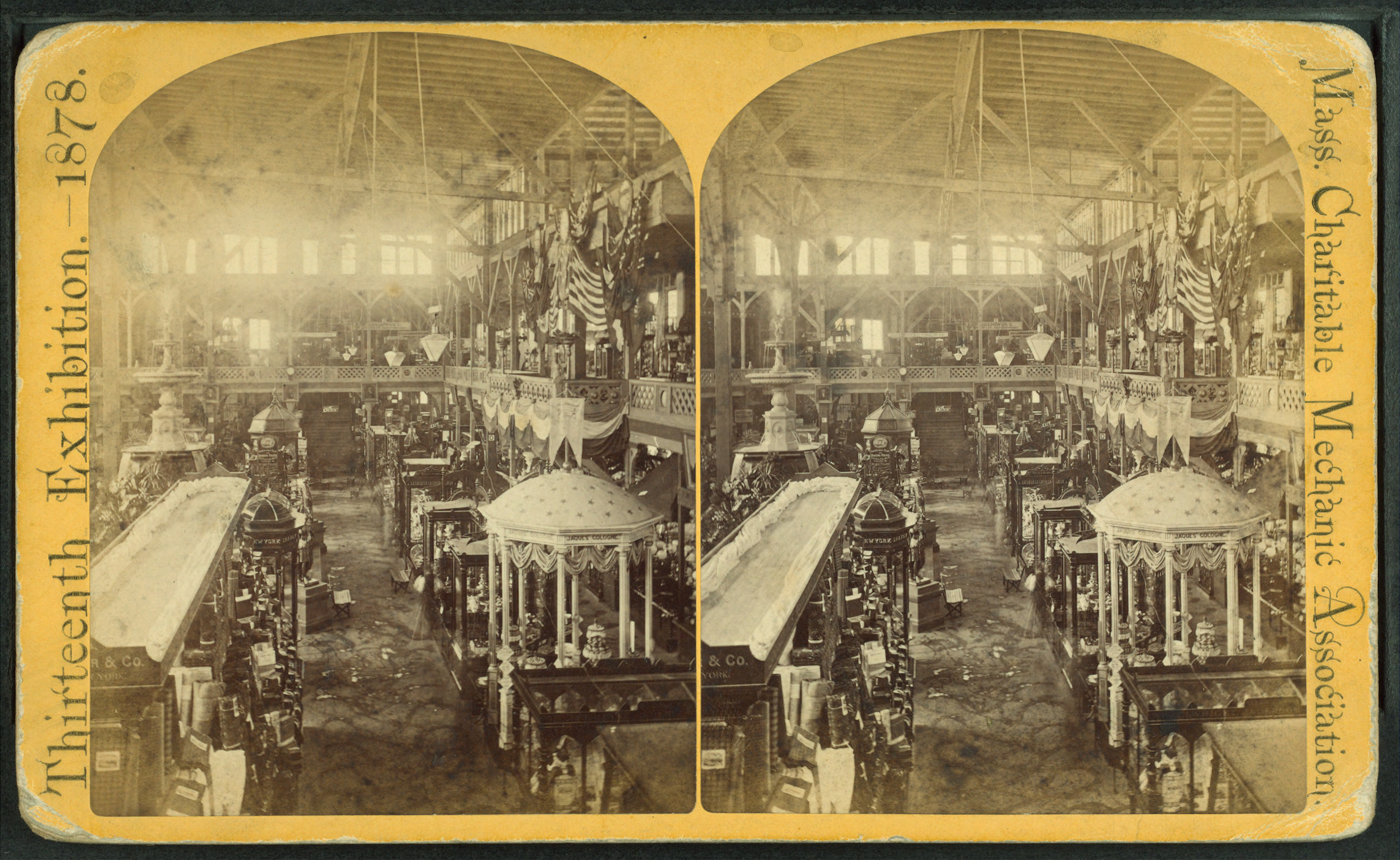
13th MCMA exhibit, Park Square, 1878

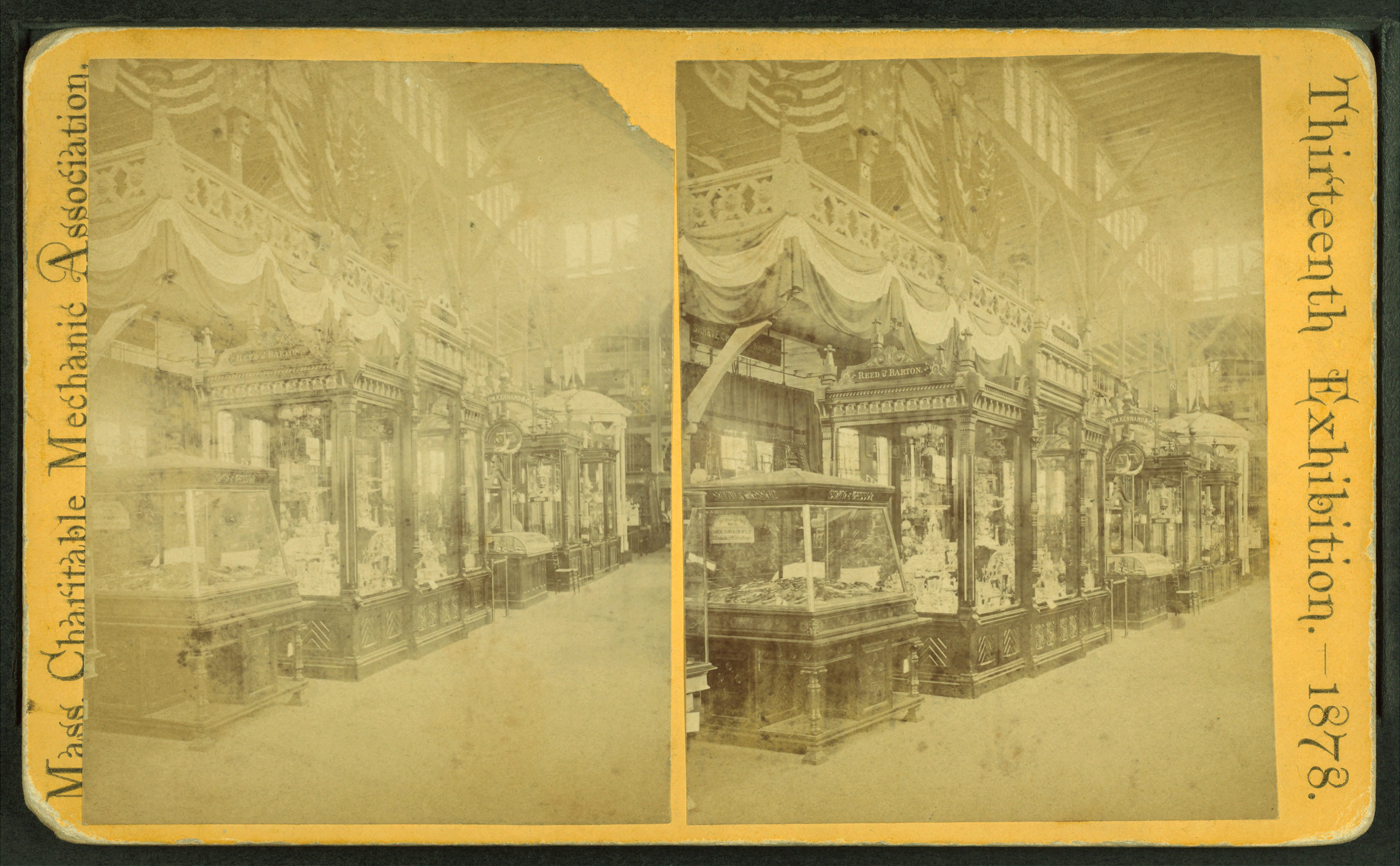
13th MCMA exhibit, Park Square, 1878

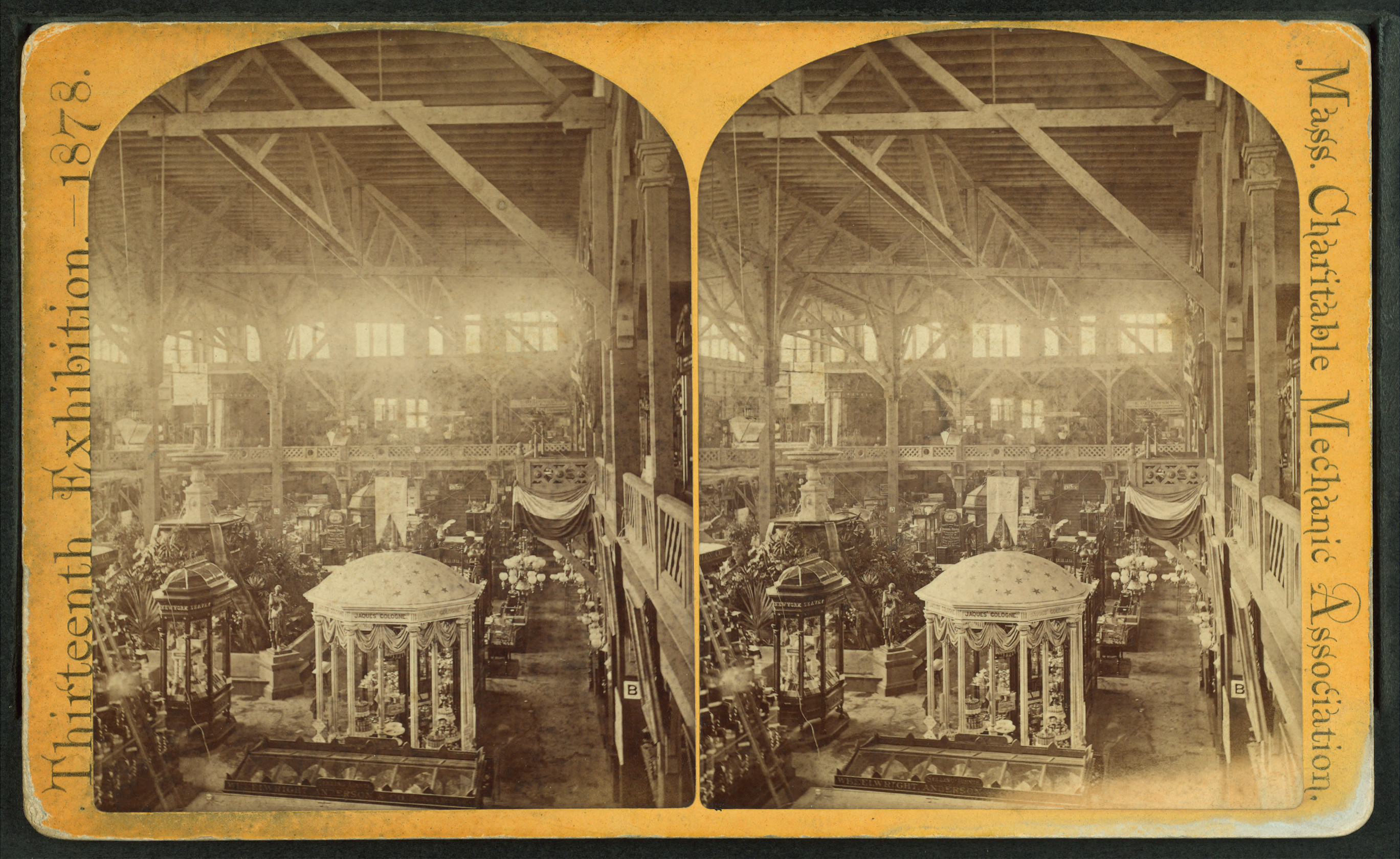
13th MCMA exhibit, Park Square, 1878

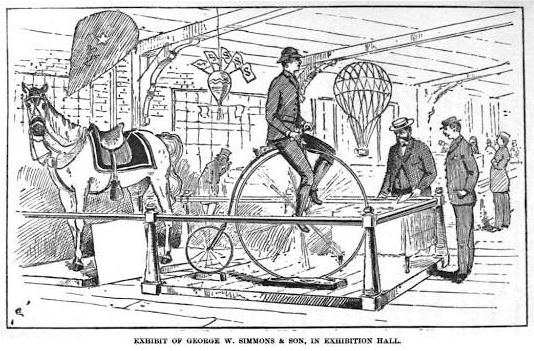
1881 MCMA exhibit

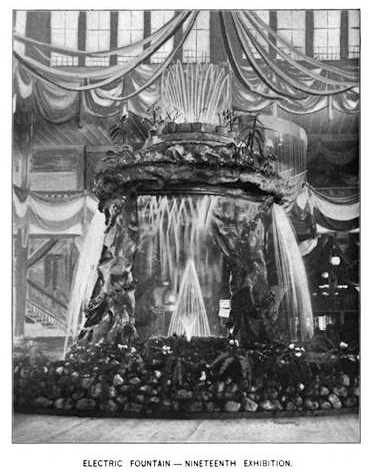
Electric fountain, 1895 MCMA exhibit

Mechanics Hall, Bedford Street (1860s-1870s)

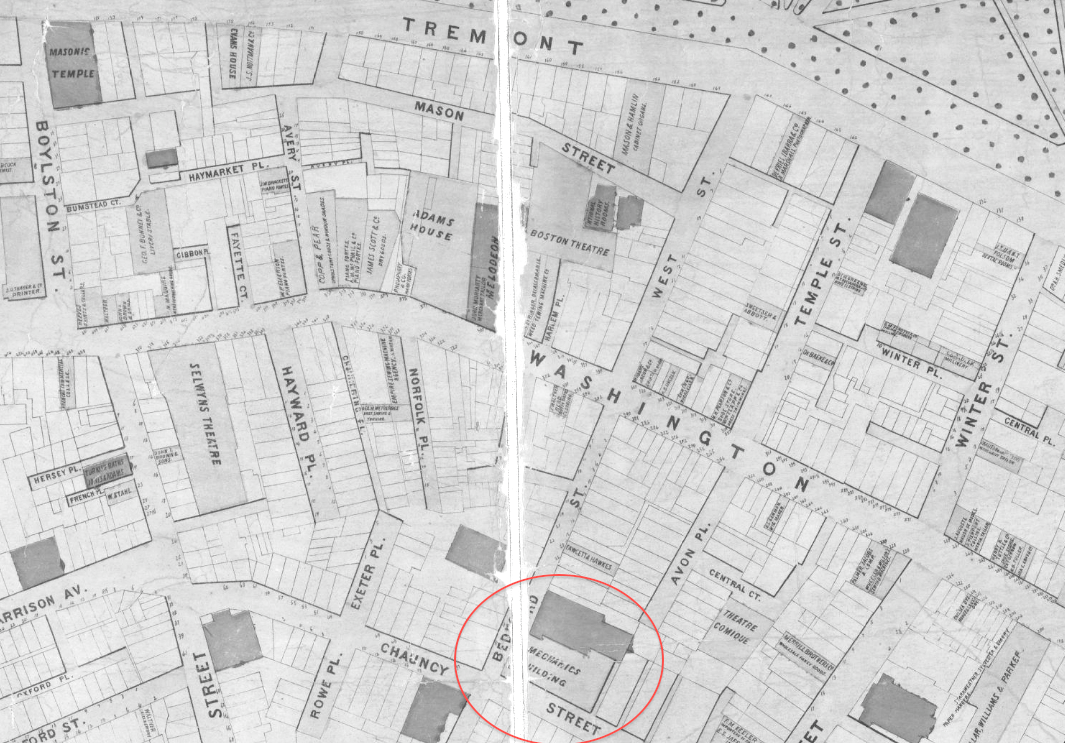
Detail of 1869 map of Boston, showing area of Mechanics Hall at Bedford and Chauncy Streets

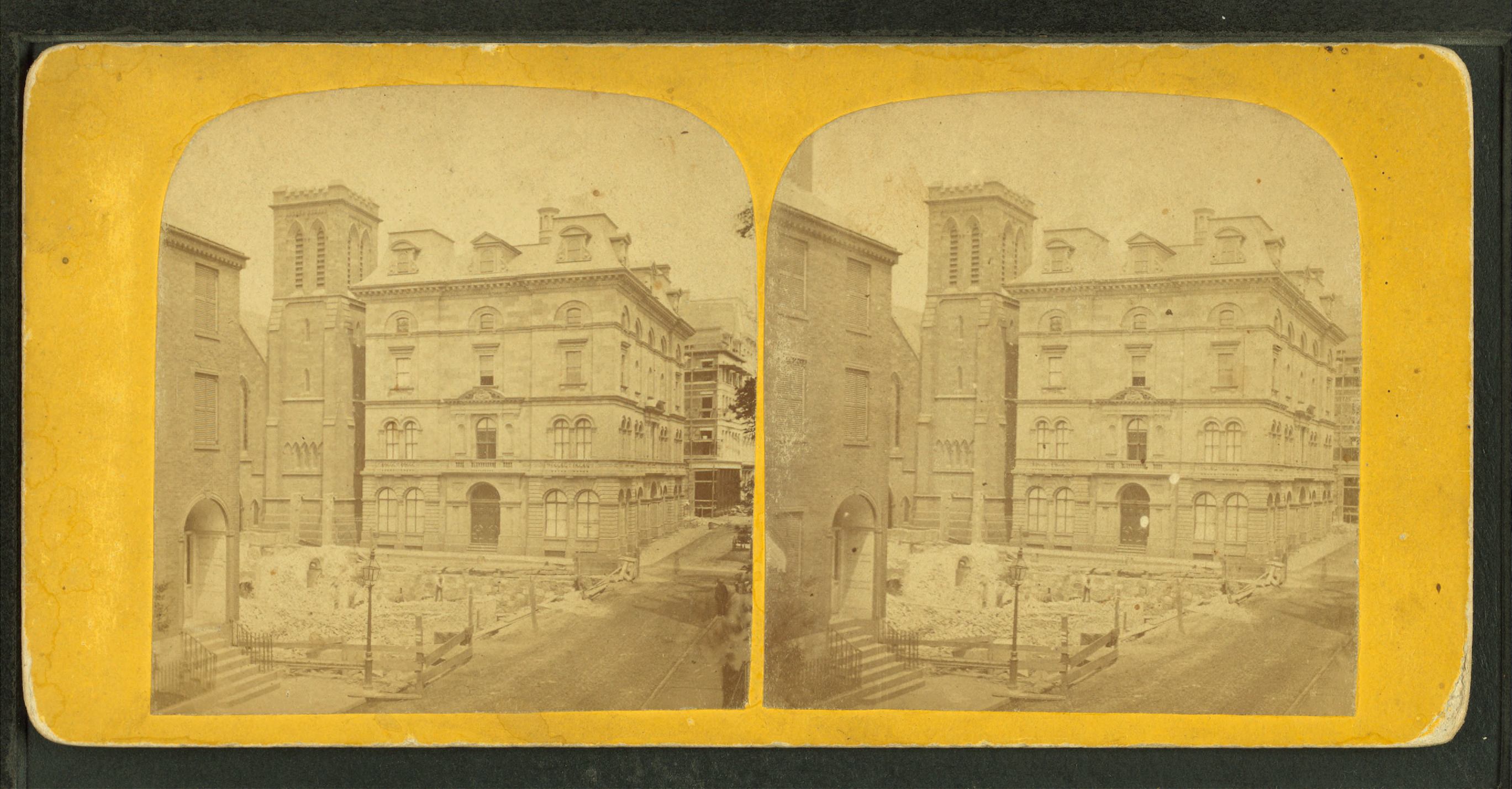
Mechanics Hall, Bedford St.

Mechanics Hall, Huntington Avenue (1881-1959)

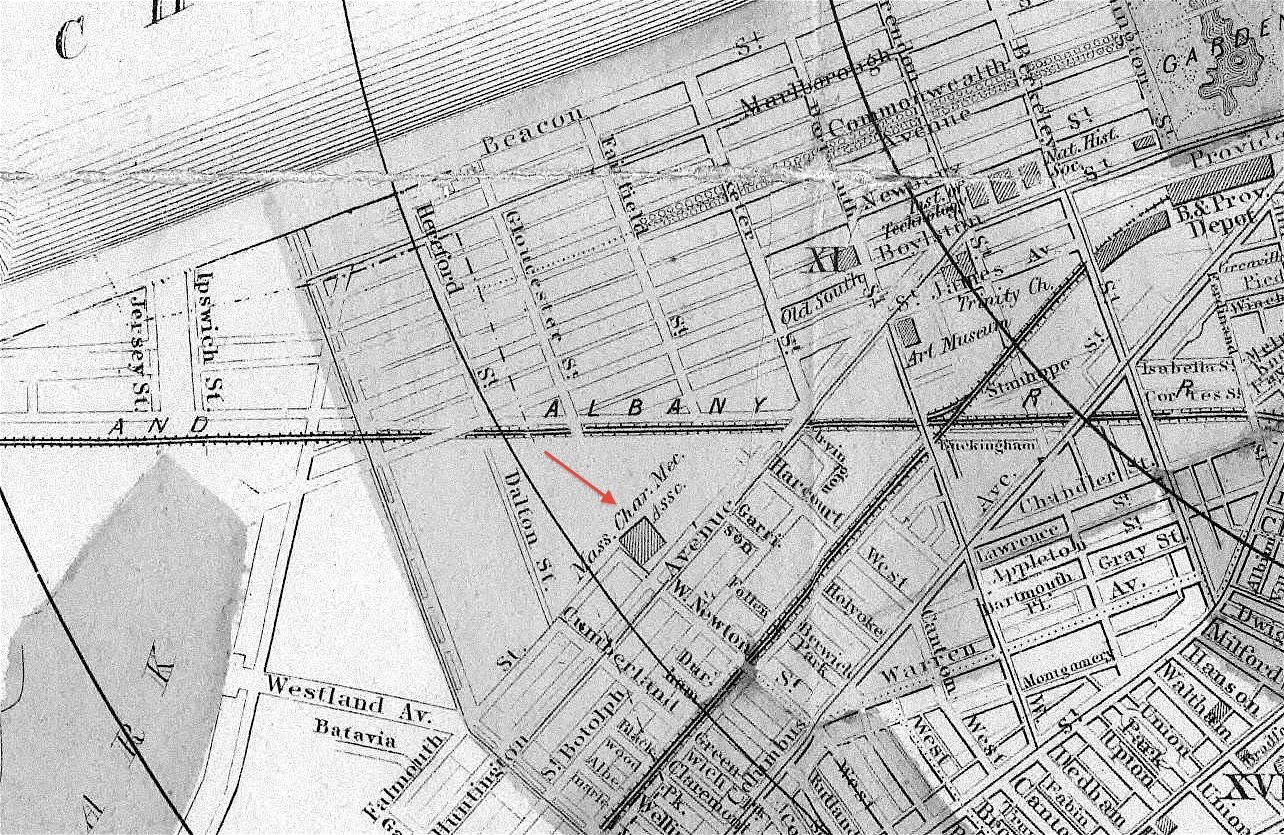
Detail of 1888 map of Back Bay, showing the new Mechanics Hall on Huntington Ave.

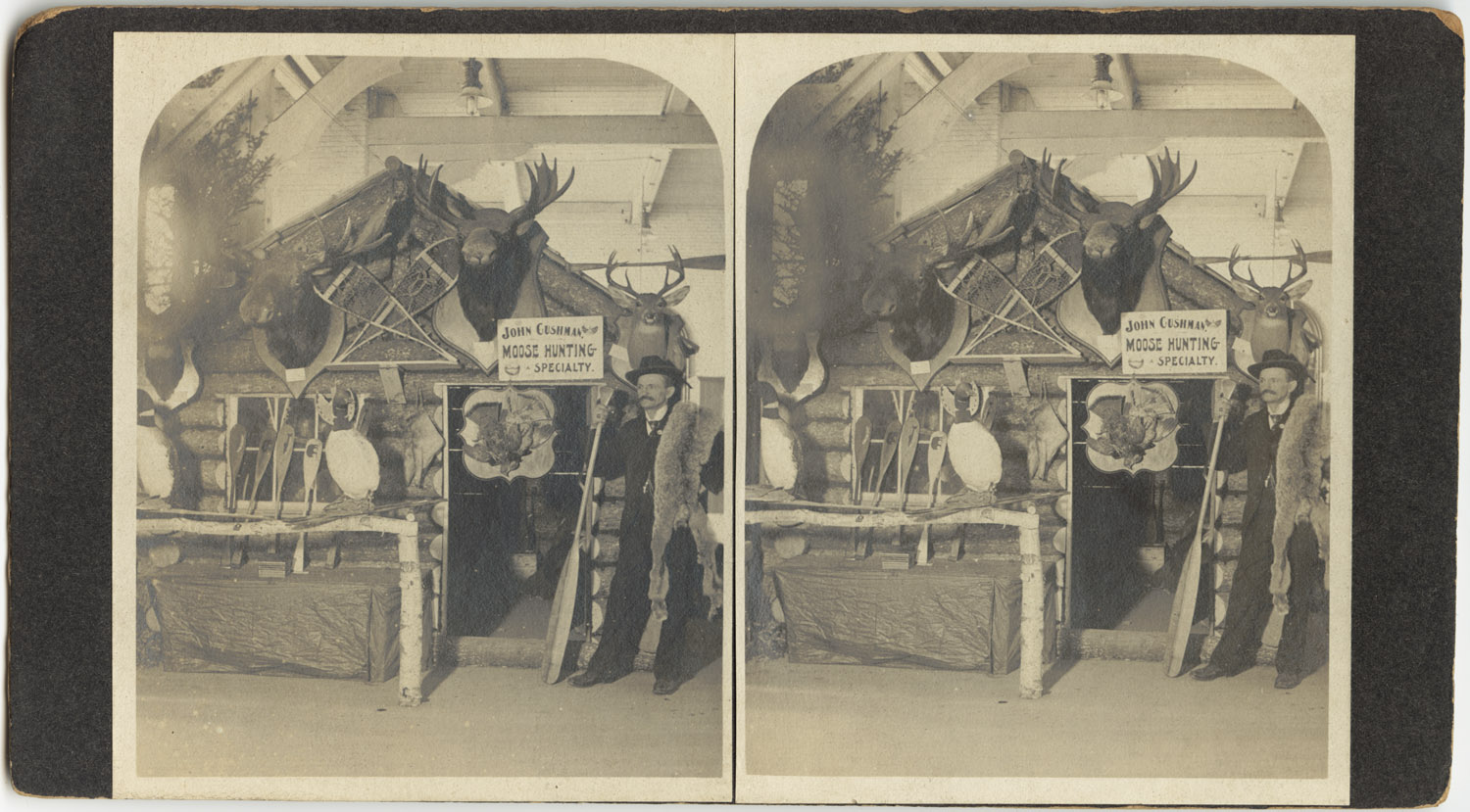
Sportsman's Show, Mechanics Hall, 19th century

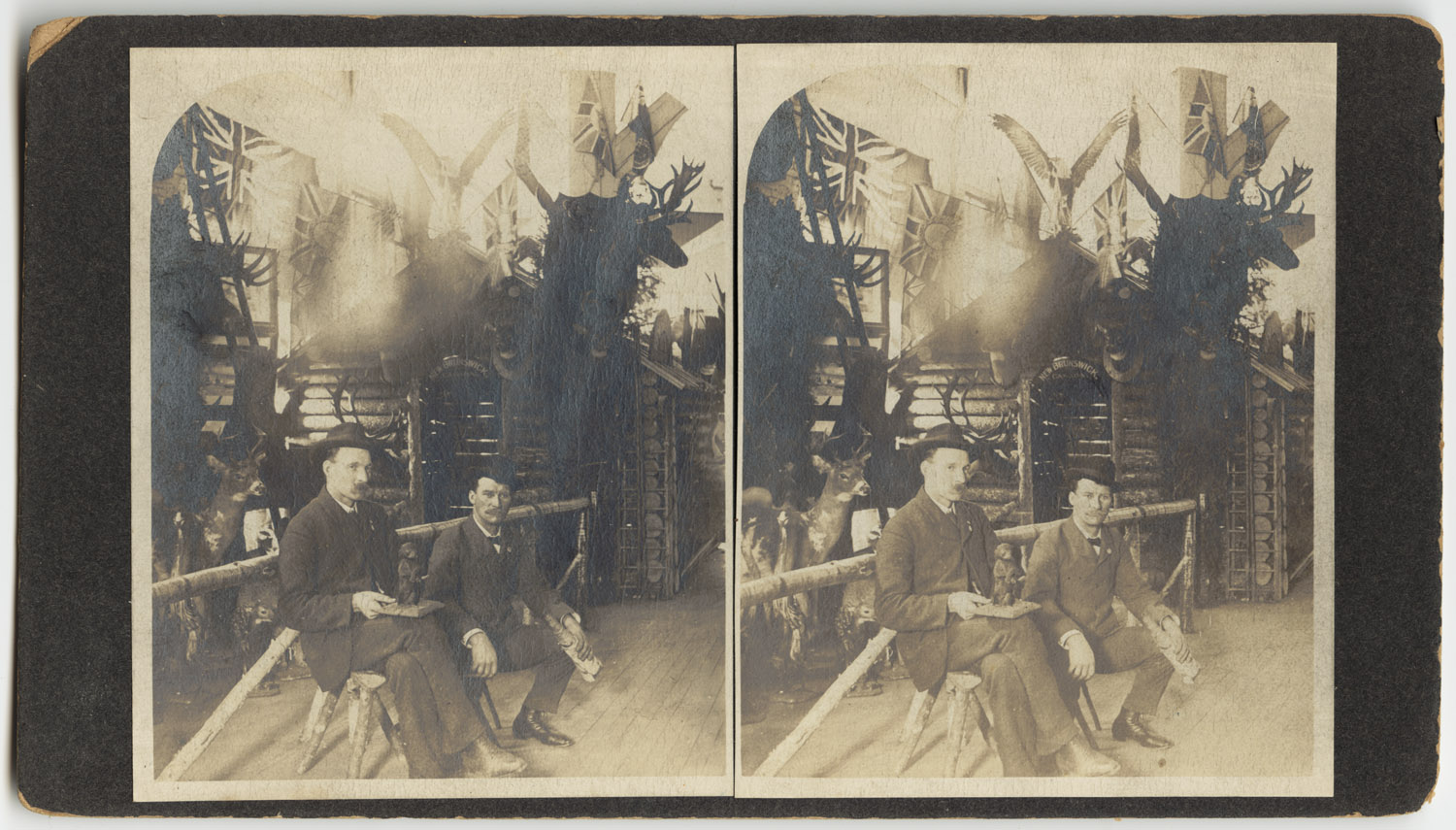
Sportsman's Show, Mechanics Hall, 19th century

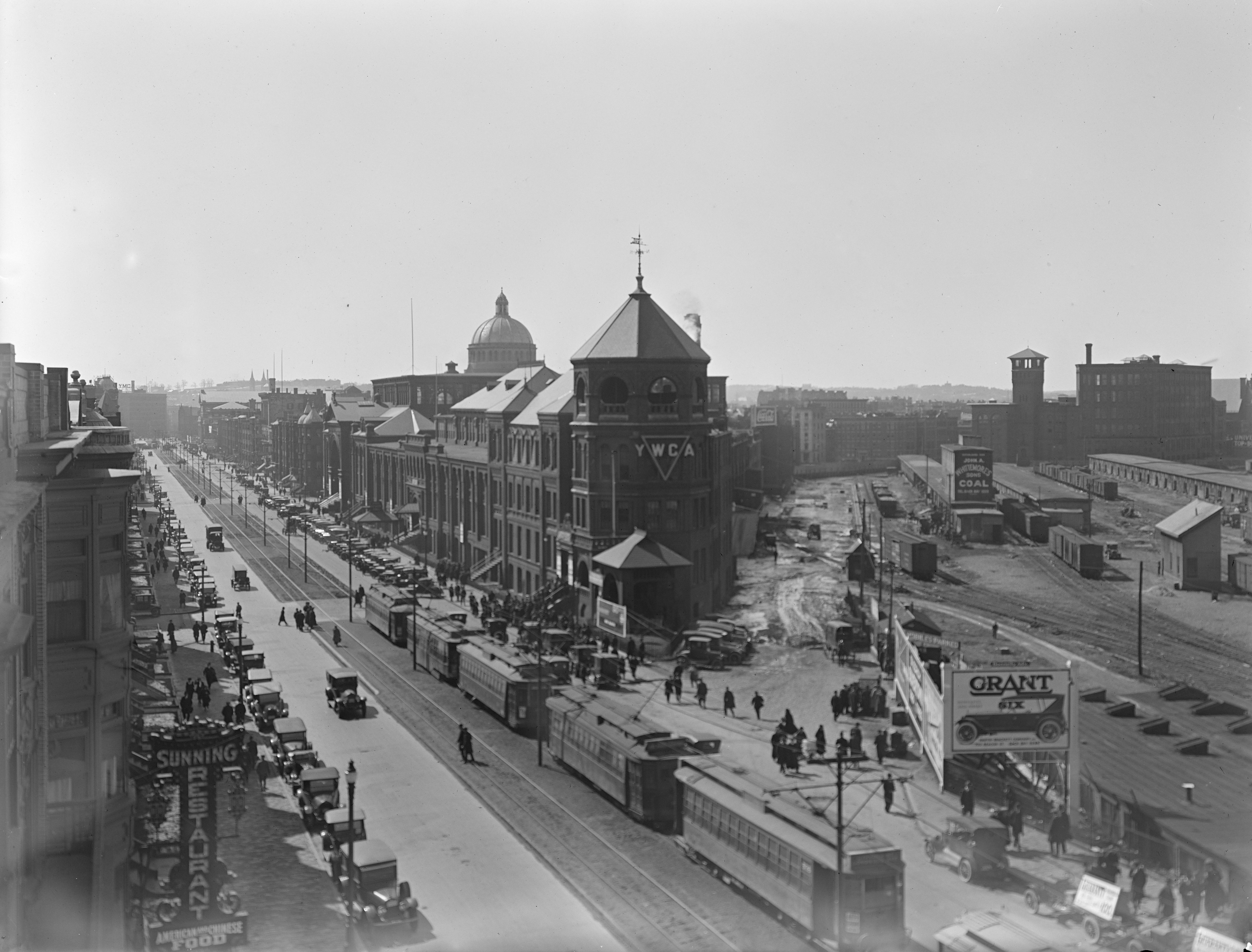
Mechanics Hall, Huntington Ave., 1920
