= Church Green Buildings Historic District =

Historic district in Massachusetts, United States

- U.S. National Register of Historic Places
- U.S. Historic district
- Boston Landmark
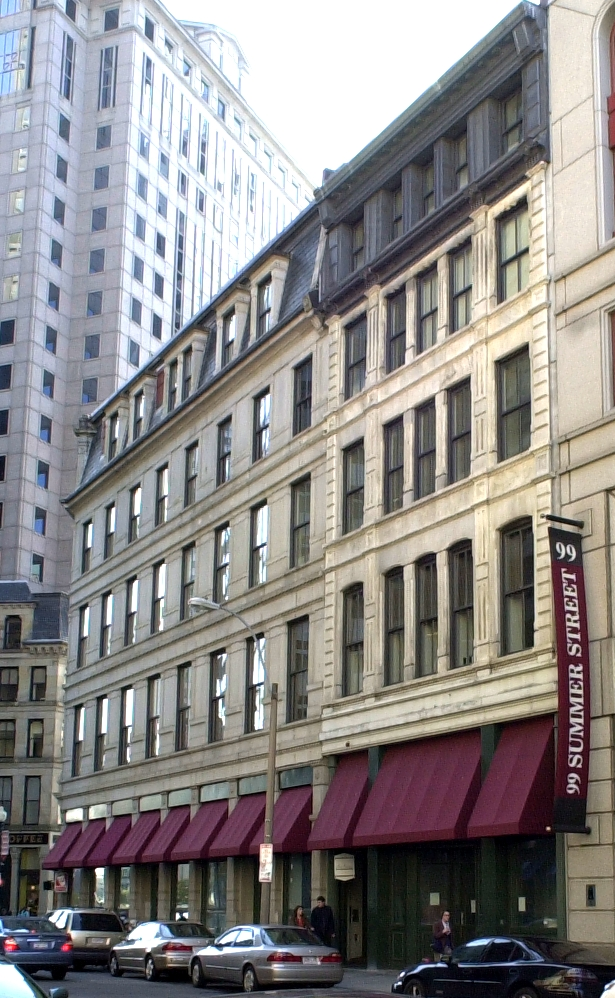

- Location within Boston Location within Massachusetts Location within the United States
- Location: 101–113 Summer St., Boston, Massachusetts
- Coordinates: 42°21′12.3″N 71°3′28.7″W
- Area: less than one acre
- Built: 1873
- Architect: Faxon, James Lyman; Bradlee, Nathaniel J.
- Architectural style: Second Empire, Italianate
- NRHP reference No.: 99001614

Significant dates
- Added to NRHP: December 30, 1999
- Designated BOSL: October 2, 1979

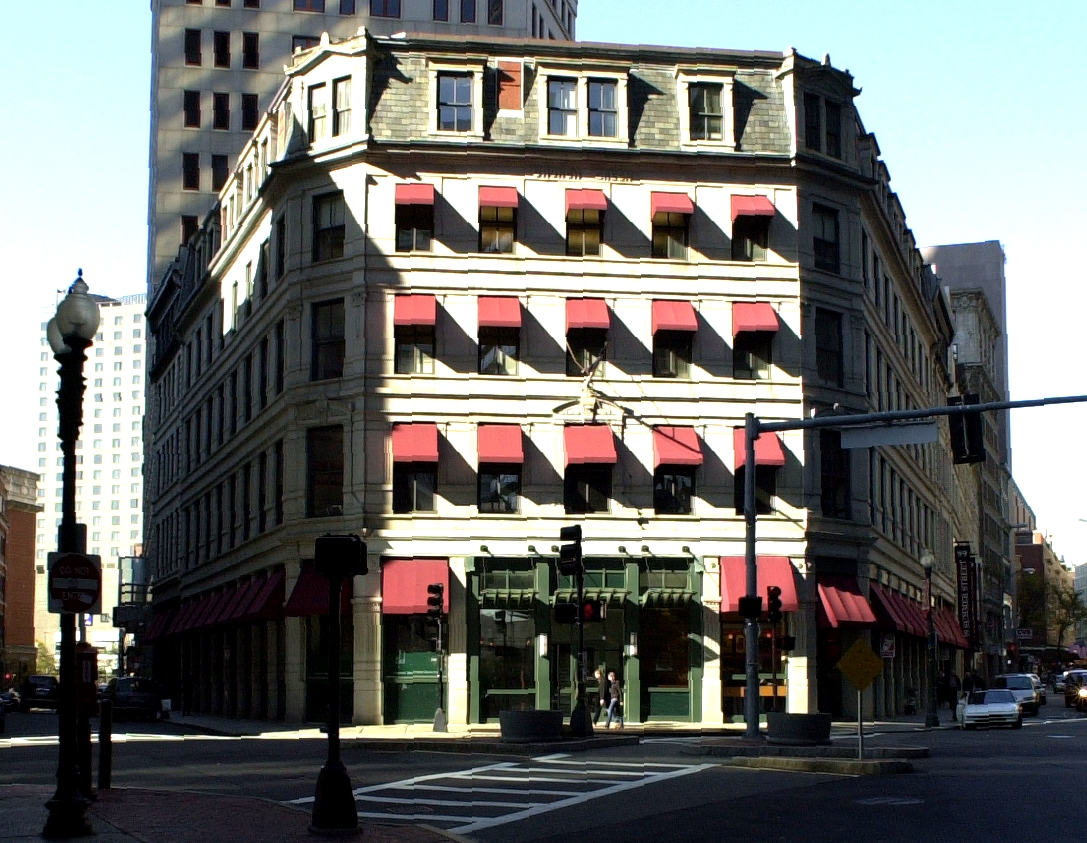

Church Green Buildings Historic District is a historic district at 101–113 Summer Street in Boston, Massachusetts.

It was built on the site of New South Church, which had been designed by Charles Bulfinch, following the destruction of the church in the Great Boston Fire of 1872. The building was originally used by trade association offices and warehouses for the leather trade. The design is thought to be by Jonathan Preston

The district was added to the National Register of Historic Places in 1999.

This building was designated as a Boston Landmark by the Boston Landmarks Commission in 1979.

== See also ==
- National Register of Historic Places listings in northern Boston, Massachusetts
