= Mechanic Apprentices Library Association =

The Mechanic Apprentices Library Association (1820–1892) of Boston, Massachusetts, functioned as "a club of young apprentices to mechanics and manufacturers ... whose object is moral, social, and literary improvement." Some historians describe it as "the first of the kind known to have been established in any country." Founded by William Wood in 1820, it also had an intermittent formal relationship with the larger, more established Massachusetts Charitable Mechanic Association. In its heyday, roughly 1820s-1850s, the Apprentices Library "[met] quarterly; ... [had] nearly 200 members, and a library of about 2000 volumes; connected with which [was] a reading room, gratuitously supplied with the best newspapers and magazines of the city, and a cabinet of natural history. In addition to these advantages, the association [had] lectures and debates in the winter, and a social class for the study of elocution in the summer."

== History ==
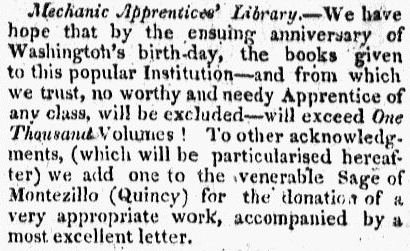
Newspaper item about the Boston Apprentices Library, 1820

Funds supporting the library derived from member dues and private donations. "Among the early donors were Governor Gore, Mr. William Phillips (who made a donation of $100), [and] admiral Sir Isaac Coffin. ... The merchants of Boston gave a valuable set of Rees' Cyclopedia." John Adams offered a donation in 1820. In 1844 Daniel Webster, as president of the Boston Society for the Diffusion of Useful Knowledge, gave $500 "for the purchase of books." Other donations were encouraged, for instance in local newspapers: "The mechanic apprentices of Boston desire information. They have not, of themselves, the means to possess it. Will our liberally-disposed citizens give it to them?" Readers in the library included future Boston mayors Joseph Wightman and Hugh O'Brien.

The Apprentices Library moved several times through the years. It "first opened in the old State House." Later it operated from Franklin Avenue (ca.1823), Congress Square (ca.1832), Tremont Row (ca.1838), Cochituate Hall on Phillips Place (ca.1856), Washington Street (ca.1861), and West Street (ca.1868).

In addition to maintaining the library, the association arranged lectures "every winter, ... generously made free to the public, as well as to the members." In 1839 John Quincy Adams delivered a lecture to the association on the topic of the late James Smithson's bequest "to the United States of America, to found at Washington, an establishment for the increase and diffusion of knowledge among men." Other lecturers included William Ellery Channing (1840), Ralph Waldo Emerson (1841), Rufus Choate (1857), and Herman Melville (1859).

As of 1850:

The association consists entirely of apprentices to mechanics and manufacturers -— of course embracing only minors. ... The affairs of the institution have been very ably and successfully conducted by its youthful members. The association occupies two rooms in Phillips Place, opposite the head of School Street; the one for reading and lecture-room (say 30 feet by 40) the other (say 30 by 15) for library and conversation room. The library is well selected to promote the intellectual culture of the class for whom it was intended. The reading department contains the principal newspapers and periodicals of the city, and many from different parts of the country, and is in a most flourishing condition. A cabinet of minerals and curiosities has been commenced; an annual course of free lectures is supported by the institution; an elocution class has been formed, the exercises of which consist in the reading of original compositions, declamation, and debate. ... The library is open three hours every Tuesday and Saturday evening. About 10,000 volumes are lent out annually.

Upkeep of the library presented challenges. By 1881, the once "flourishing institution" languished. "The decadence of the apprentice system has had a very damaging effect on it, so that it is impossible for apprentices, in sufficient numbers, to be found who will take interest enough in the old society to continue the work from which many men, now leading citizens and manufacturers, reaped so much benefit. The library, once numbering six thousand or seven thousand volumes, has, for months, been stowed away in a dusty room, affording no benefit to anybody. The library "was discontinued only when such action was made necessary by the lack of interest and patronage which was occasioned by the gradual abolition of the apprenticeship system."
