= New South Church (Boston, Massachusetts) =

Church in Massachusetts, United States

Coordinates: 42°21′12.41″N 71°3′28.62″W

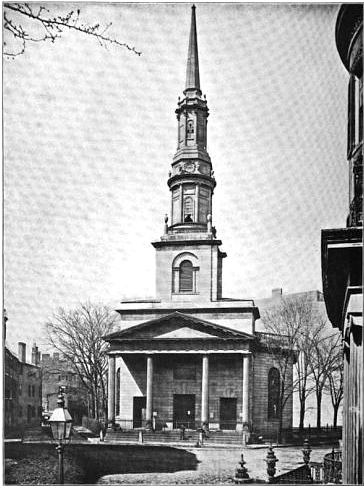
New South Church, on Church Green, Boston, c. 1858

New South Church (1714–1866) was a Congregational Unitarian church of the "New South Society" in Boston, Massachusetts, located on "Church Green" at the corner of Summer Street and Bedford Street. Pastors included Samuel Checkley and John Thornton Kirkland. In 1814 architect Charles Bulfinch designed a new building for the society; it was demolished in 1868. The congregation merged with the New South Free Church in 1866.

== History ==
=== 1714–1814 ===
Founders of the New South Church first met around 1714 at the "old Bull Tavern, at the corner of Summer and Sea Streets."

In 1715, the town of Boston deeded a parcel of land (65 by 45 feet (20 m × 14 m)) with a harbor view "to petitioners who proposed to build a church ... to be called the 'New South.' The father of Samuel Adams ... lived on Purchase Street, near Congress, and was one of the signers of the petition." Among the 44 initial subscribers were Samuel Adams Sr.; John Barton; Nicholas Boon; David Craige; Eleaz. Dorby; William Engs; Samuel Greenleaf; Henry Hill; Daniel Legre; Thomas Peck; Eneas Salter; Eneas Salter Jr.; Thomas Salter; Jonathan Simpson.

The new building was completed by 1719. It was "a convenient wooden building with a handsome steeple finished after the lonick order, in which is a bell." "It was of timber, 65 by 45 by 31 feet, with flat roof and battlements." Samuel Checkley was ordained as first pastor on April 15, 1719. "The covenant was signed on the same day" by several of the original subscribers, as well as Samuel Bridgham, John Clough, Thomas Downe, and Benjamin White.

=== 1814–1868 ===
In 1814 a new building was constructed, designed by Charles Bulfinch, at a cost of 2,188 pounds. It was built out of Chelmsford granite. "The first story of the steeple is an octagon, surrounded by 8 columns and a circular pedestal and entablature; an attic, above this, gradually diminishing by 3 steps of gradins, supports a second range of Corinthian columns with an entablature and balustrade from this, the ascent in a gradual diminution, forms the base of the spire, which is crowned with a ball and vane." In the first half of the 19th century "Summer Street was, beyond dispute, the most beautiful avenue in Boston. Magnificent trees then skirted its entire length, overarching the driveway with interlacing branches, so that you walked or rode as within a grove in a light softened by the leafy screen" of elms. Inside the church, the organ was built by Thomas Appleton.

In 1866, the church "was merged in the New South Free Church." The New South Society's William Tilden served as pastor there for several decades. The building was demolished in 1868. Today the former site of the Church Green is known as the Church Green Buildings Historic District.

=== Pastors ===
- Samuel Checkley (pastor 1719–1769; d.1769)
- Penuel Bowen (pastor 1766–1772)
- Joseph Howe (pastor 1773–1775; d.1775)
- Oliver Everett (pastor 1782–1792)
- John Thornton Kirkland (pastor 1794–1810)
- Samuel Cooper Thacher (pastor 1811–1818; d.1818)
- F. W. P. Greenwood (pastor 1818–1821)
- Alexander Young (pastor 1825–1854; d.1854)
- Orville Dewey (pastor 1857–1862)
- William P. Tilden (pastor 1862–1866)
