= Thomas Brattle =

American businessman, astronomer and college administrator

Thomas Brattle (June 20, 1658 – May 18, 1713) was an American merchant who served as treasurer of Harvard College and member of the Royal Society. He is known for his involvement in the Salem Witch Trials and the formation of the Brattle Street Church.

Brattle was also a mathematician, astronomer, and an experienced traveler.

== Early life ==
Coat of Arms of Thomas Brattle

Thomas Brattle was born on June 20, 1658, in Boston, Massachusetts Bay Colony, to Elizabeth Brattle née Tyng and Captain Thomas Brattle. He was the couple's second child, and the first son to survive past infancy. He had eight siblings, including William Brattle and Catherine Winthrop. Brattle's date of birth is often confused with the first-born son of the Brattle family (also named Thomas Brattle) – who was born on, and died on, September 5, 1657.

As a child, Brattle was exposed to radical forms of the Puritan faith, primarily through his father's participation in the controversial founding of the Third (South) Church, which advocated for ecclesiastical reforms. The church's membership included many notable members such as Samuel Sewall, Samuel Adams, and Benjamin Franklin. At one point in time, Thomas' father, Captain Brattle, was named the wealthiest man in the colony. After the death of his father, Thomas was appointed administrator of the estate on April 12, 1683, leaving him with a large sum of money and a healthy plot of land.

Before attending Harvard University in 1676, he attended the Boston Latin School. This school was open to all boys regardless of class, and served to educate and prepare the young men for university. The Boston Latin School is where Brattle met influential Puritan leader Cotton Mather. Although the two men agreed on many social and political ideologies later in life, they did not see eye to eye during their time at the Boston Latin School. It is documented that Thomas Brattle and other schoolmates enjoyed picking on Cotton Mather (to the point where he wrote to his father, Increase Mather, and requested to come home early). After his time at the Boston Latin School, Brattle attended Harvard University and received an AB in mathematics and science.

== Education ==
In 1676, Brattle graduated from Harvard College with an A.B.. Brattle developed marked skill in mathematics and science. Brattle was interested in many areas including mathematics, architecture, and astronomy.

Brattle gained most of his education on his own due to the bad leadership at Harvard in his undergraduate years. He used whatever books that were available and studied with John Foster and Dr. William Avery. Brattle wrote a letter to John Flamsteed, a mentor of his, stating that no one at Harvard could teach him mathematics so he took it upon himself to do so. Thomas and a group of other prominent colonists studied several comets that appeared in the late seventeenth century. He wrote several essays on these comets.

Brattle later travelled abroad and then settled in Boston in 1693, where he pursued a short business career and gave several gifts to Harvard. That same year, he was appointed as the Harvard College treasurer and he served in that position for twenty years until his death. During his time as treasurer, the finances of the college grew exponentially. Brattle was a member of the intellectually elite Royal Society. The Royal Society was a new group of scientific thinkers that practiced a more intense and rational thought process. This group grew much larger in the eighteenth century when it was headed by Sir Isaac Newton. Sir Isaac Newton was so impressed with Brattle's work that he planned to procure his papers on astronomy and math after Brattle's death in order to benefit the Royal Society. In an attempt to obtain them, Newton tried to make his brother, William Brattle, a member of the Society, however William declined. In 1711, Brattle attempted to use a mathematical algorithm in order to end smallpox. Although he failed, it can be seen that Brattle was heavily involved in education and scientific discovery. Brattle made more substantial contributions to science than any other American of the day.

== Personal life ==
Brattle's mother was Elizabeth Brattle and his father Captain Thomas Brattle, who was one of Boston's wealthy maritime merchants.

Brattle was an accomplished amateur mathematician and astronomer which eventually led him to becoming the unofficial professor of mathematics and astronomy at Harvard. There he taught and trained students in return for their assistance in his research. His work was directly influenced by the ideas of Robert Boyle and John Flamsteed, which he communicated to his students. In addition to being a professor, he became the treasurer of Harvard College. Circumstantial evidence indicates that he designed Stoughton Hall at Harvard and his own Brattle Street Meeting House.

Brattle lived in London from 1682 to 1689 in order to study science. There he was involved in both scientific communities which can "help us understand a good deal about the progress of scientific expertise in colonial New England," since he was able to communicate information to both communities. Among his accomplishments, he was also a member of Royal Society, and Ancient and Honorable Artillery Company of Massachusetts.

Brattle was also the principal founder of the Brattle Street Church, which broke away from the Congregational church. This sparked an intense dispute between Brattle and famous Puritan minister, Cotton Mather. Rather than being similar to the Puritans, his church was more like the Church of England. He was eulogized by the Reverend Benjamin Colman as "worth Christian philosopher, who was also the glory of his country in respect to his excelling knowledge of mathematics".

== Legacy ==
=== Salem Witch Trials ===
Brattle participated in the Salem Witch Trials as one of the observers and commentators. Later, he was one of personages who became more open about their criticisms of the trials. Along with Robert Calef and Thomas Maule, he was particularly critical of the procedures adopted.

On October 8, 1692, Brattle wrote a letter to an unnamed English clergyman containing his sentiments. The letter was circulated widely in Boston at the time, and it continues to be studied for its reasoned attack on the witchcraft trials in Salem. The "highly literate" and "satirical tone" of the letter was seen as writing beyond its time, leading Perry Miller to call it a "milestone in American literature." Brattle denounced the persecution of suspected witches, and his letter revealed a "chink in the armor" of Puritan ideology. Brattle presents a compelling argument against the legal premises and procedures involved in the afflictions, accusations, and executions, with a particular focus on the invalidity of spectral evidence in proceedings. He argued that the procedures were so contrary to established practice and were dire in their consequences.

Brattle's letter was designed to illustrate the wrongful convictions that the Court of Oyer and Terminer made during this time as they based their evidence on witchcraft from intangible evidence. He was careful to not critique the "Salem Gentlemen", which he referred to as the judges and ministers, but rather focused on critiquing the methods they used. After Governor Phips read Brattle's letter, he ordered that the courts could no longer use intangible evidence as a source to convict individuals of witchcraft. Phips dissolved the court entirely within the same month. Six months later, the Superior Court of Massachusetts took over the remaining witchcraft cases and no one else was found guilty thereafter. Although Brattle's letter was written after 20 people were already wrongfully convicted, his powerful letter helped shape the future of Salem.

=== Church Reformation ===
As a result of the reaction toward theological, political, and cultural transformations that affected the whole of New England in the later half of the 17th century, the Brattle Street Church was formed as a result of radical development in the evolution of colonial congregationalism - bringing reason and religion together in a new church. The Congregational Church was broadly catholic, but used conservative principles of congregationalism (that just liberty and privilege should be allowed to all, while imposing nothing upon an individual). Although it did not make any radical changes from contemporary theological consensus - its foundation did represent the first concrete fragmentation of a previously united New England Congregational Community.

Outside of his involvement in the Salem witch trials, Brattle and his younger brother William provided new radical ideas that the Puritan Church did not agree with. Brattle preached some of these more liberal ideas in the church he founded, the Brattle Street Church, which led to an argument with Puritan minister Cotton Mather. Also, both Thomas and William improved Harvard College. Thomas donated money many times, served as treasurer of the college, and was an unofficial professor of astronomy and mathematics. When Brattle died, he left the New World with a new rational approach towards thought.

=== Other achievements ===
Brattle is also credited as being the first person to import an organ to the colonies.
