= F. W. P. Greenwood =

Unitarian Minister

The Reverend F. W. P. Greenwood D.D.
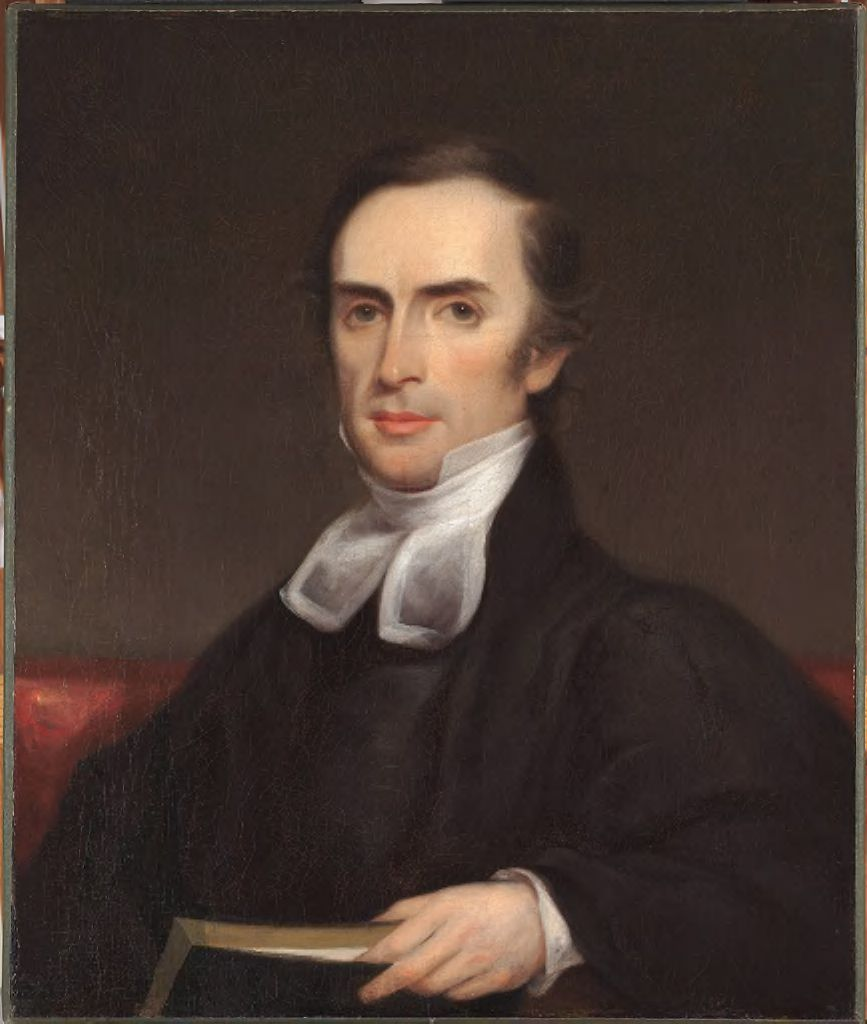
- Portrait of Greenwood by Joshua Henshaw Hayward

Orders
- Ordination: October 1818

Personal details
- Born: Francis William Pitt Greenwood; February 5, 1797 Boston, Massachusetts, US
- Died: August 2, 1843 (aged 46) Dorchester, Massachusetts, US
- Buried: Copp's Hill Burying Ground
- Spouse: Maria Goodwin
- Education: Harvard College (1814)

Minister of King's Chapel in Boston, Massachusetts
- In office 1824–1843
- Preceded by: Samuel Cary
- Succeeded by: Ephraim Peabody

Pastor of New South Church in Boston, Massachusetts
- In office October 1818 – June 1821
- Preceded by: Samuel Cooper Thacher
- Succeeded by: Alexander Young

Francis William Pitt Greenwood (February 5, 1797 - August 2, 1843) was a Unitarian minister of King's Chapel in Boston, Massachusetts.

== Biography ==
Francis William Pitt Greenwood was born February 5, 1797, in Boston, Massachusetts. He was the oldest son of Dr. William Pitt Greenwood and Mary Langdon. Greenwood was educated at Harvard College and graduated in 1814. Following graduation, he studied theology under the Rev. Dr. Henry Ware Jr. and became pastor of New South Church in and was ordained in October 1818. He left this position after about a year, following a sudden illness of "bleeding from the lungs," and spent nearly two years in England. While in England, Greenwood wrote home and resigned his pastorship at New South Church in June 1821.

After returning to the United States in the fall of 1821, he lived for a time in Baltimore, Maryland, in hopes of improving his health living in a milder climate. Here, he preached in the pulpit of the Unitarian Church led by his friend, Rev. Jared Sparks. In May, 1824, Greenwood married Maria Goodwin of Baltimore, by whom they had one son.

In the summer of 1824, he returned to Boston to become associate minister of King's Chapel, serving under his mentor, James Freeman, of whom he would later write his biography. In 1827, following Freeman's retirement and death, Greenwood became pastor of King's Chapel. He revised the church's liturgy and later prepared a popular hymnbook, which was adopted by many other churches. During his tenure, he established a Sunday School for children of the parish. His pastorate was interrupted various times by a recurrence of illness, and in 1837, he traveled to Cuba on the advice of doctors.

He wrote for and edited the Christian Examiner throughout the 1820s and 1830s. His 1826 series, "Letters on Missions," was especially noted as being controversial for its severity in tone. Greenwood's writings were also published in the Boston Journal of Natural History and The Token and Atlantic Souvenir. In April 1825, Greenwood was elected a member of the Massachusetts Historical Society. He was also one of the first members of the Boston Society of Natural History and was elected a Fellow of the American Academy of Arts and Sciences. Greenwood also received an honorary Doctor of Divinity from Harvard College in 1839.

He preached his last sermon on May 22, 1842, at a church in Salem, Massachusetts and died August 2, 1843, in Dorchester, Massachusetts at the age of 46, due to his lingering illness. Greenwood was buried at Copp's Hill Burying Ground in the North End of Boston.

His sermons were published in 1844 in two volumes by his friend a parishioner, former Boston Mayor Samuel A. Eliot.

== Works ==
- A Sermon delivered on the twenty-fifth anniversary of the Boston Female Asylum, Sept. 23, 1825.
- Greenwood and G.B. Emerson, eds. The classical reader. 1826.
- Funeral sermon on the late Hon. Christopher Gore: formerly governor of Massachusetts. Preached at King's Chapel, Boston, March 11, 1827. Boston: Wells and Lilly, 1827.
- Lives of the twelve apostles. 1828. 2nd ed., 1835. 3rd ed., 1846.
- Prayer for the Sick: A Sermon Preached at King's Chapel, Boston, on Thursday, August 9, 1932, Being the Fast Day Appointed by the Governor of Massachusetts, On Account of the Appearance of Cholera in the United States. Boston: L.C. Bowles, 1832.
- A History of King's Chapel, in Boston. 1833.
- Memoir of the Rev. James Freeman. Collections of the Massachusetts Historical Society. 1836.
- Spring. The Token and Atlantic Souvenir. 1838.
- A Description of the principal fruits of Cuba. Boston Journal of Natural History, Volume 2. 1839.
- The Sea. The Boston Book, Volume 3. Boston: Light and Horton, 1841.
- Sermons to Children. Boston: James Munroe, 1841.
- The Spirit's Song of Consolation. American common-place book of poetry. 1841.
- Sermons of the Rev. F.W.P. Greenwood, in Two Volumes. Boston: Charles C. Little and James Brown, 1844.
