= Brattle Street Church =

Church in Boston, Massachusetts (1698–1876)

Coordinates: 42°21′37.08″N 71°3′28.44″W

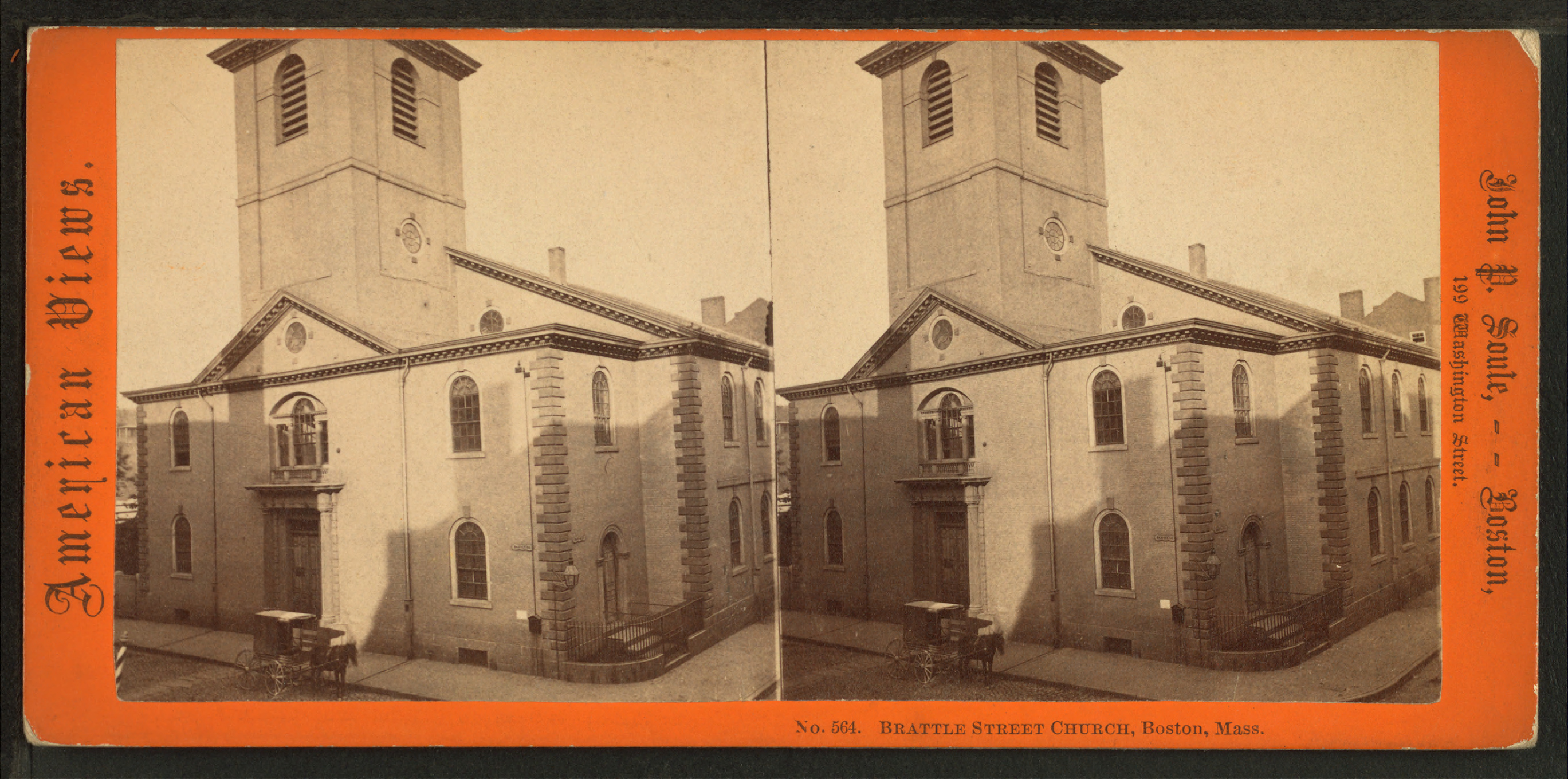
Brattle St. Church, designed in 1772 by Thomas Dawes

Brattle Street Church (1698–1876) was a Congregational (1698 – c. 1805) and Unitarian (c. 1805–1876) church on Brattle Street in Boston, Massachusetts.

== History ==
=== 17th century ===
In January 1698, "Thomas Brattle conveyed the land on which the meeting-house was to stand; and on the 10th of May, 1699, a formal invitation was extended to Benjamin Colman... to be its minister." To distinguish itself in contrast to Boston's three other Congregational churches, the new fourth church issued a manifesto that detailed a somewhat relaxed attitude toward rigid Calvinist practices. Thomas Brattle probably designed the unpainted, wood, meetinghouse-style building for the church, erected in 1699. The building had a "main entrance in the bell tower (while retaining a secondary entrance on the long side) and ...[a] pulpit at the opposite end ...[and] rounded or compass windows."

=== 18th century ===
In 1717 and 1724, the church hosted "the first singing school in Boston." The wood church building of 1699 was replaced in 1772 with a brick structure, designed by Thomas Dawes. (John Singleton Copley had also submitted a design proposal, but Dawes' plan won.). For the new building, John Hancock "gave a thousand pounds, and a bell." Around 1778, William Billings ran a "highly praised singing school" at the church.

Hans Gram played organ in the late 18th century. Parishioners included John Hancock, Samuel Adams, Joseph Warren, John Adams, Abigail Adams, Richard Clarke, Elizabeth Greenleaf, Jane Mecom, John Lowell, Lydia Hancock, Henry Cabot Lodge, James Bowdoin (1676–1747), and many others. "Cato, favorite servant of the [John] Hancocks... received his freedom at age thirty, married, and baptized his children at the prestigious Brattle Street Church, all the while continuing to serve the town's leading family."

Henry Cabot Lodge, a parishioner in his youth, noted: "It was a fine old eighteenth-century church with a square tower, in which was embedded a cannon-ball said to have been fired and lodged there by the American batteries at the siege of Boston. The interior was in the classical style of Wren, much in vogue in the province in the days of Anne and the first Georges. A huge mahogany pulpit, the gift of John Hancock, towered up darkly in the center of what would have been called the chancel in any other than a Puritan church."

=== 19th century ===
In 1872, the Brattle Street church building was demolished. Work on a new church building in Back Bay began in 1873. Designed by architect Henry Hobson Richardson, it opened in 1875, and is known as the Brattle Square Church. The church "became extinct in 1876." The church building was sold in 1882 to the First Baptist congregation.

== Ministers ==
Through the years, ministers included:

- Benjamin Colman (1699–1747)
- William Cooper (1716–1743)
- Samuel Cooper (1747–1783)
- Peter Thacher (1785–1802)
- Joseph Stevens Buckminster (1805–1812)
- Edward Everett (1814–1815)
- John Gorham Palfrey (1818–1831)
- Samuel Kirkland Lothrop (1834–1876)

== Alternate names ==
At various times in its history, the Brattle St. Church was also known as:

- The Brattle Square Church
- The Brattle Street Congregational Church
- The Brattle Street Meeting House
- The Church and Society in Brattle Street
- The Church in Brattle Square
- The Manifesto Church
- The Religious Society in Brattle Street
- The Society in Brattle Street

== Images ==
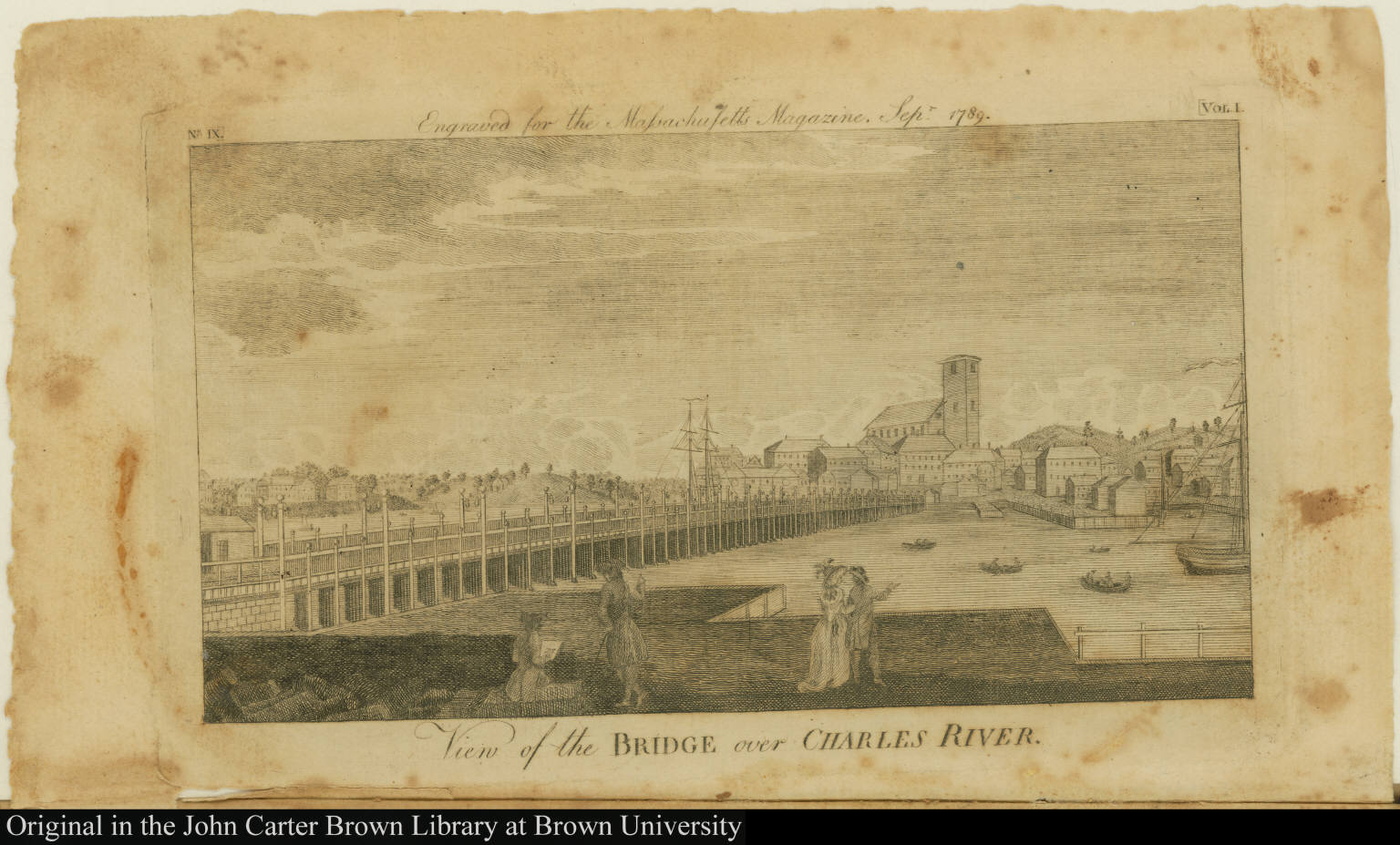
View of Brattle St. Church and Boston's West End, looking from across the Charles River in Cambridge, 1789

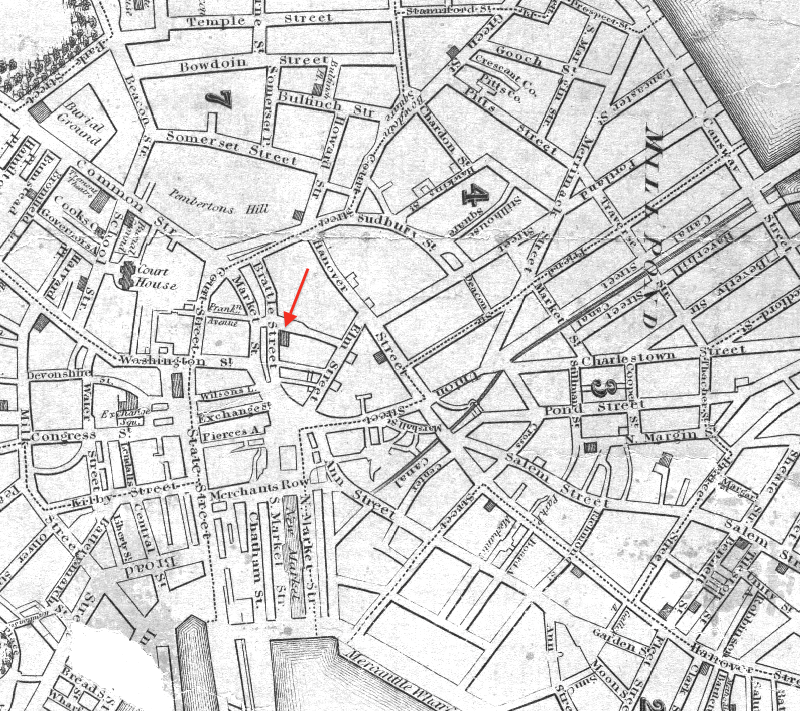
Detail of 1829 map of Boston, showing location of Brattle St. Church

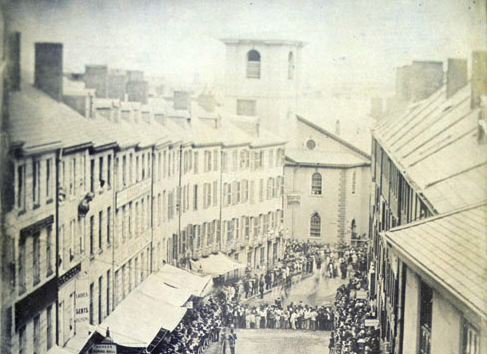
View of Brattle St. and church, 1855 (Bostonian Society)

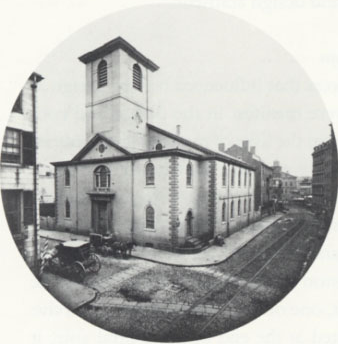
Brattle St. Church, Boston, 1859. Photo by J.J. Hawes

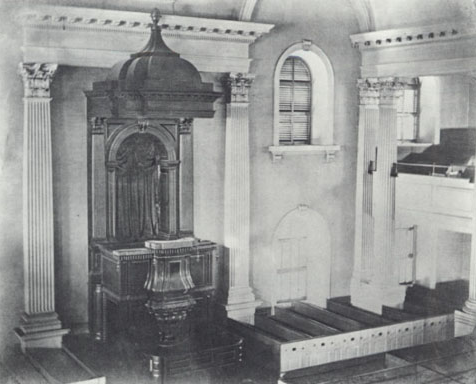
Interior, Brattle St. Church, Boston, c.1860s
