= Orville Dewey =

American Unitarian minister (1794–1882)

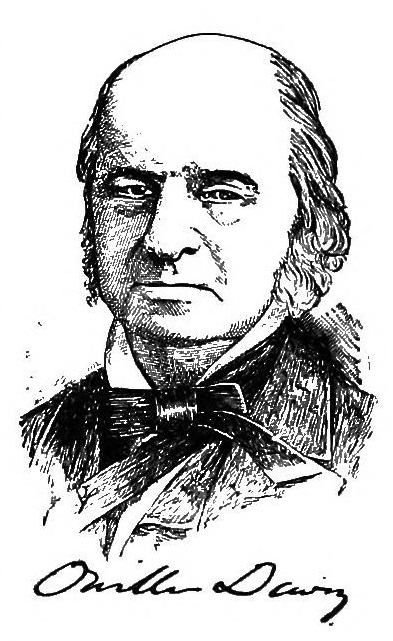
- Born: March 28, 1794; Sheffield, Massachusetts
- Died: March 21, 1882 (aged 87); Sheffield, Massachusetts
- Education: Williams College Andover Theological Seminary
- Occupation: Minister

Orville Dewey (March 28, 1794 – March 21, 1882) was an American Unitarian minister.

== Early life ==
Dewey was born in Sheffield, Massachusetts. His ancestors were among the first settlers of Sheffield, where he spent his early life, alternately working upon his father's farm and attending the village school. He was naturally thoughtful, and was encouraged in his love of reading by his father. His mother's piety had great influence in the formation of his character. The strict Calvinism that colored the religious life around him was greatly tempered by his intercourse with his cousin, Paul Dewey, who was an able mathematician and a skeptic with regard to the prevailing theology.

Dewey's parents had him so thoroughly prepared for College that he entered the sophomore class in Williams College, where he was graduated in 1814. He then returned to Sheffield, where he engaged in teaching, and afterward went to New York, becoming a clerk in a dry goods house. He was graduated at Andover Theological Seminary in 1819, and for eight months was agent for the American Education Society, having declined an immediate and permanent pastorate on account of his unsettled views regarding theology.

Notwithstanding a very candid expression of his opinions, he was offered a pulpit in Gloucester, which he accepted temporarily. He soon became a Unitarian, and was appointed to be the assistant of Dr. William Ellery Channing, in Boston, with whom he formed a lasting friendship, and whose Church he supplied during its pastor's travels in Europe.

== Career ==
In 1823 he became pastor of the Unitarian Church in New Bedford, remaining there for ten years, until he went to Europe on account of his health. In the early 1830s, he wrote a Phi Beta Kappa address at Harvard. That is a pre-Transcendentalism oration. He was called to the second Unitarian Church of New York in 1835, which during his ministry built the Church of the Messiah. In 1840, he was elected to the National Academy of Design as an Honorary Academician. In 1842 his health again failed, and he went a second time to Europe, returning in 1844.

He was compelled to resign his charge in 1848, and retired to his farm in Sheffield, where he prepared a course of lectures for the Lowell Institute of Boston, on the "Problem of Human Life and Destiny", which course was repeated twice in New York, and delivered in many other cities. This was followed by a second Lowell course, in 1855, on the "Education of the Human Race", which was widely repeated. Dr. Dewey was called to a church in Albany, where he remained one year, and to Washington, D.C., where he spent two years.

In 1858 he again settled in Boston as pastor of the New South Church, but retired after four years of service. He returned to his farm in Sheffield, where he resided until his death.

He lectured frequently, and appeared in public for the last time in the old Congregational Church at the centennial celebration, June 18, 1876. His controversial articles and sermons were reprinted in a cheap form by the Unitarian Association. His first book was Letters on Revivals. His works were issued in a collected edition (1 vol., London, 1844), and reissued (3 vols., New York, 1847). His daughter, Mary Elizabeth Dewey, born in Sheffield, was an author and editor; she translated George Sand's novel The Miller of Angibault and edited Life and Letters of Catharine M. Sedgwick (New York, 1871).

Orville Wright was named after him.
