= Samuel Kirkland =

American Presbyterian minister and missionary (1741–1808)

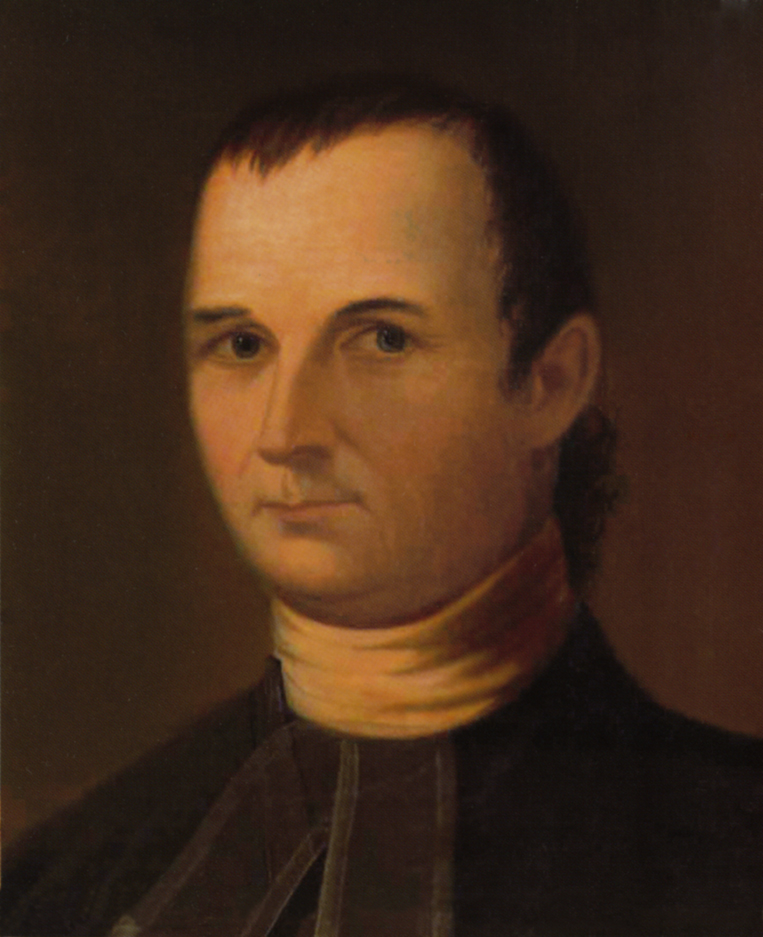
Portrait of Samuel Kirkland by Augustus Rockwell

Samuel Kirkland (December 1, 1741 – February 28, 1808) was a Presbyterian minister and missionary among the Oneida and Tuscarora peoples of central New York State. He was a long-time friend of the Oneida chief Skenandoa.

Kirkland graduated from the College of New Jersey (later Princeton) in 1765. In 1793 as part of his missionary work with the Oneida tribe he founded a seminary, the Hamilton-Oneida Academy in Clinton, New York. The seminary admitted both Euro-American and Oneida boys. Kirkland named it in honor of Treasury Secretary Alexander Hamilton, who was a member of the first Board of Trustees of the Hamilton-Oneida Academy. The Hamilton-Oneida Academy was chartered as Hamilton College in 1812.

A student of the Iroquoian languages, Kirkland lived for a number of years with the Haudenosaunee. He helped negotiate the land purchases that New York State made from the Haudenosaunee after the American Revolutionary War, acquiring his own land in the process.

== Early life and education ==
Samuel Kirkland was born on December 1, 1741, in Norwich, Connecticut. He was educated in common schools and at the College of New Jersey (later Princeton), where he graduated in 1765. He was soon ordained as a Presbyterian minister and wanted to proselytize Native Americans.

== Career ==
Kirkland began his missionary work as a protégé of Reverend Eleazar Wheelock in Connecticut at his Moor's Indian Charity School (later relocated to New Hampshire as Dartmouth College). Kirkland met Joseph Brant, a Mohawk who became a war leader against the rebels during the American Revolutionary War while at the school. Kirkland and Wheelock parted company in 1770. Kirkland moved to central New York, where he became a missionary to the Haudenosaunee, especially the Oneida and Tuscarora located at the western end of the Mohawk River Valley. He acted as an adviser and ambassador to the Haudenosaunee during the American Revolutionary War. At a time when four of the Six Nations allied with the British, he helped persuade the Oneida and Tuscarora to assist the American revolutionaries.

Warfare in the Mohawk Valley caused widespread destruction in both the colonial frontier settlements and multiple Haudenosaunee villages, as one side and another conducted retaliatory attacks. After the war, Kirkland maintained good relations with the Haudenosaunee. In 1790 he was visited by the Italian explorer Paolo Andreani who reported on his observations of Kirkland and the Oneida people. Andreani noted that Kirkland had collected basic word lists of over 200 languages. He also saw how Kirkland conducted Sunday services with translated psalms. The participants were teased by other members of the tribe but the congregation was sincere and they abstained from hunting and other work on Sundays.

Kirkland played a key role in organizing purchases of lands from the Oneida on behalf of New York state, in the process securing large parcels of the Oneida land for himself and his friends. Kirkland's assistant James Dean was present at every land cession from the Oneida to the state of New York between 1785 and 1818. He was elected a Fellow of the American Academy of Arts and Sciences in 1790. Kirkland helped negotiate treaties and keep peace between the Haudenosaunee, who were relocated to smaller reservations, and the European settlers. He is considered by some to be the peacekeeper between the Haudenosaunee and the settlers after the war, when settlers did not sufficiently distinguish between former allies and those nations who had been enemies and responsible for destruction. In addition, the wave of migration from New England brought multiple Yankees eager to acquire land, and they encroached on the Haudenosaunee both before and after land purchases by the state.

Long interested in education, in 1793 Kirkland founded the Hamilton-Oneida Academy as a boys' school in central New York to meet demand from the new European-American settlements. (This later developed as Hamilton College.) It was a time of the development of boys' schools throughout the state, followed in the nineteenth century by girls' schools.

== Marriage and family ==
On September 19, 1769, Samuel Kirkland married Jerusha Bingham (1743–1788) in Lisbon, Connecticut. Several of their eleven children became prominent. Their son, John Thornton Kirkland (1770–1840) was President of Harvard College from 1810 to 1828. Their eldest daughter, Jerusha Kirkland, (1776–1862) married John Hosmer Lothrop (1769–1829).

The Kirklands' granddaughter Frances Eliza Lothrop (1809–1893) married John Hiram Lathrop (1799–1866). A graduate of Yale with a law degree, he became a teacher and, in 1840, the first President of the University of Missouri at Columbia. The couple were honored by a large memorial stained glass window in Grace and Holy Trinity Cathedral in Kansas City, Missouri, where descendants of both the Lathrops and the Kirklands are members of the Parish.

== Legacy and honors ==
- The town of Kirkland, New York, is named after Samuel Kirkland.
- Kirkland College, a former liberal arts women's college in New York that merged with Hamilton College was named for Samuel Kirkland.
