= John Thornton Kirkland =

President of Harvard University

The Reverend John Thornton Kirkland
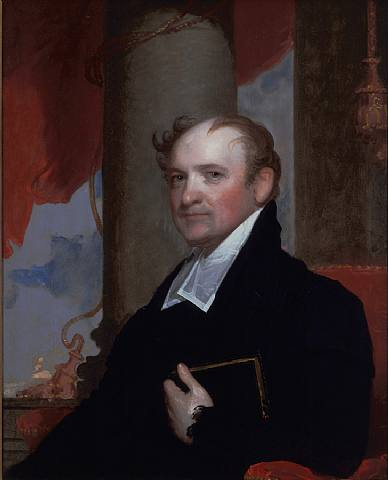
- Portrait by Gilbert Stuart, circa 1816

15th President of Harvard University
- In office 1810–1828
- Preceded by: Samuel Webber
- Succeeded by: Josiah Quincy III

Personal details
- Born: August 17, 1770 Herkimer, New York
- Died: April 26, 1840 (aged 69) Boston, Massachusetts
- Parents: Samuel Kirkland; Jerusha Bingham Kirkland

John Thornton Kirkland (August 17, 1770 – April 26, 1840) was an American Unitarian Congregational clergyman who served as President of Harvard University from 1810 to 1828. As an undergraduate, he was a member of the Hasty Pudding. He is remembered chiefly for his major renovations to the university structure and the so-called "Augustan Age" that Harvard went through under his leadership. Kirkland House, one of Harvard's undergraduate "houses," or residence halls, was named in his honor.

== Biography ==
John and his twin brother, George, were born at Herkimer, New York, August 17, 1770. Their parents were Rev. Dr. Samuel Kirkland and his wife, Jerusha Bingham Kirkland. She was a niece of Rev. Eleazar Wheelock, D. D.

John Kirkland studied as a child at Andover and thereafter enrolled at Harvard College at the age of 15. He finished his degree there and noted in a brief autobiography that he had achieved excellence and received recognition from his professors there but also had "wasted much time, much money, some virtue, and some health." He was particularly noteworthy in his studies of Latin and metaphysical sciences.

Kirkland's studies were briefly interrupted by a stint in the military during Shay's Rebellion in the winter of 1787, when he served under General Benjamin Lincoln. His patriotism was fervent and often discussed in both his speeches and later biographies on his life.

Kirkland finished his degree at Harvard in 1789 and was then enlisted as head tutor of metaphysical studies. He maintained this role until 1794, when he was invited to serve as pastor of the New South Church, a role he would fill for 16 years.

In 1810, Kirkland was elected President of Harvard University. He served as president for 18 years, and retired from the position in 1828 after suffering a stroke and a period of bad health. His resignation came as a complete shock to the community. He was remembered fondly by his students as a thoughtful, genuine, and amiable man who was more a friend than a superior.

Kirkland's presidency is thought by some to be one of the greatest in the university's history. It has been described as the "Augustan Age" of Harvard, as he oversaw an enormous overhauling of the university's finances, operation, and curriculum. He served with very little controversy, a record marred mostly by the so-called "Great Rebellion" in 1820 that saw almost an entire class expelled and a personal conflict with Dr. Nathaniel Bowditch, to whom some at the time attributed Kirkland's resignation.

Oliver Wendell Holmes describes him thus, in his study of Ralph Waldo Emerson: "His 'shining morning face' was round as a baby's, and talked as pleasantly as his voice did, with smiles for accents and dimples for punctuation.... It was of him that the story was always told,--it may be as old as the invention of printing,--that he threw his sermons into a barrel, where they went to pieces and got mixed up, and that when he was going to preach he fished out what he thought would be about enough for a sermon, and patched the leaves together as he best might."

His contemporary George Ticknor described Kirkland's sermons as "full of intellectual wealth and practical wisdom, with sometimes a quaintness that bordered on humor."

Kirkland served as pastor of the New South Church in Boston, 1794–1810. He was elected a Fellow of the American Academy of Arts and Sciences in 1799. Kirkland was a founding member of the American Antiquarian Society in 1812. His wife Elizabeth Cabot was the daughter of Congressman George Cabot.

== Works ==
Kirkland left behind many speeches, sermons, and dialogue over his lengthy career. He also left behind numerous letters, mostly to his nephew, which are preserved in various archives around the country. Harvard University's archives hold most of his documents relating to his term as President of the university. He had a few preferred publishers, most notably Jeremy Belknap, at whose funeral Kirkland delivered the eulogy. He left behind a small autobiography, written shortly after he graduated from Harvard. Some notable works include:

(1795) 'A Sermon, Preached before the Ancient and Honorable Artillery Company.'

(1800) 'A Discourse Occasioned by the Death of General George Washington.'

(1816) 'A Discourse, Presented before His Excellency Caleb Strong.'

Academic offices
Preceded by Samuel Webber	President of Harvard University; 1810–1828	Succeeded by Josiah Quincy III
