= John Henry Bufford =

American lithographer (1810–1870)

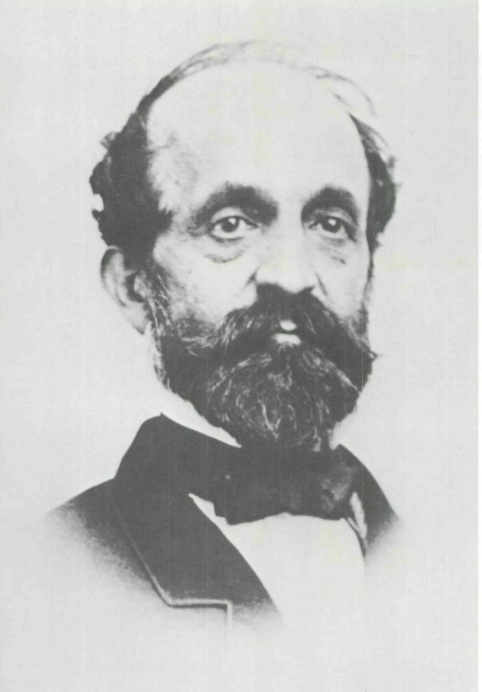
John Henry Bufford, ca. 1860

John Henry Bufford (1810–1870) was a lithographer in 19th-century Boston, Massachusetts.

== Biography ==
Bufford trained "in the Pendleton shop in Boston from 1829 to 1831."

In 1835 he moved to New York, where he "worked independently for five years while accepting commissions from George Endicott and Nathaniel Currier." Bufford returned to Boston in 1839, and became "chief artist" in the print shop owned by Benjamin W. Thayer (who had bought the Pendleton outfit)."

By 1844, the shop's name changed to J.H. Bufford & Co. (1844–1851)." By one assessment, "Bufford's firm produced lively, accomplished images in many forms, including sheet music, city views, marine views and landscapes, book illustrations, reproductions of paintings, commercial depictions of factories, and contemporary genre views; ... [and] lithographic portraits copied from daguerreotypes." Artists who worked for Bufford included Francis D'Avignon, Winslow Homer, and Leopold Grozelier. Clients included music publisher William H. Oakes.

In the 1840s-1860s Bufford lived in Roxbury and worked on Washington Street:

- J.H. Bufford & Co. (1844–1851), 204-206 Washington St.
- J.H. Bufford (1851–c. 1852), 260 Washington St.
- Bufford's Lithographic & Publishing House, also known as Bufford's Print Publishing House, 313 Washington St. (c. 1857–1864)
- John H. Bufford (c. 1869), 490 Washington St.

After Bufford's death in 1870, his sons Frank G. Bufford and John Henry Bufford, Jr. continued the business. By 1879, "J.H. Bufford's Sons, Manufacturing Publishers of Novelties in Fine Arts" worked from offices at 141-147 Franklin Street, Boston; and in 1881–1882 expanded the enterprise as far as New York and Chicago.

== Images ==
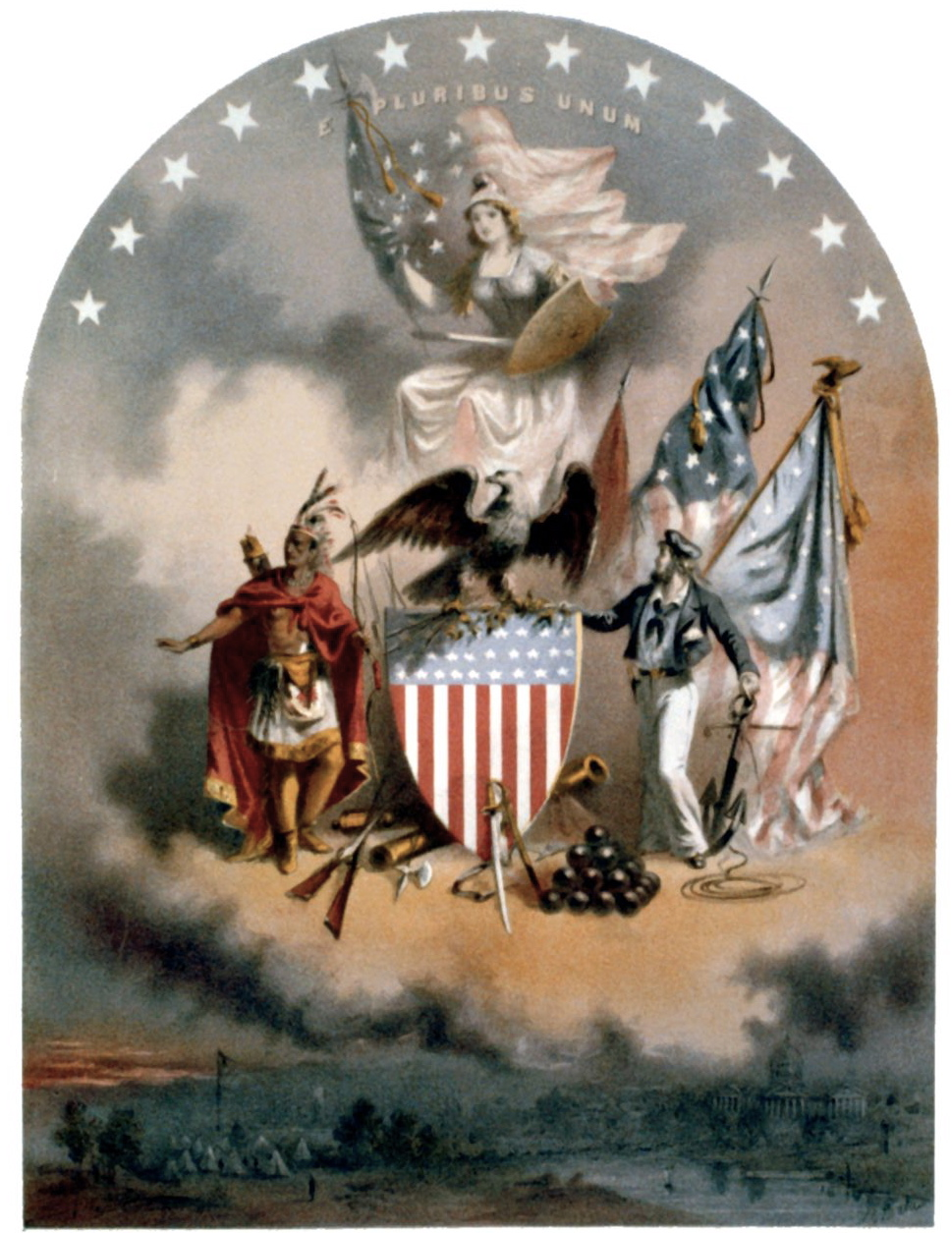
Lithograph issued from Bufford's Print Publishing House, Boston, 1864

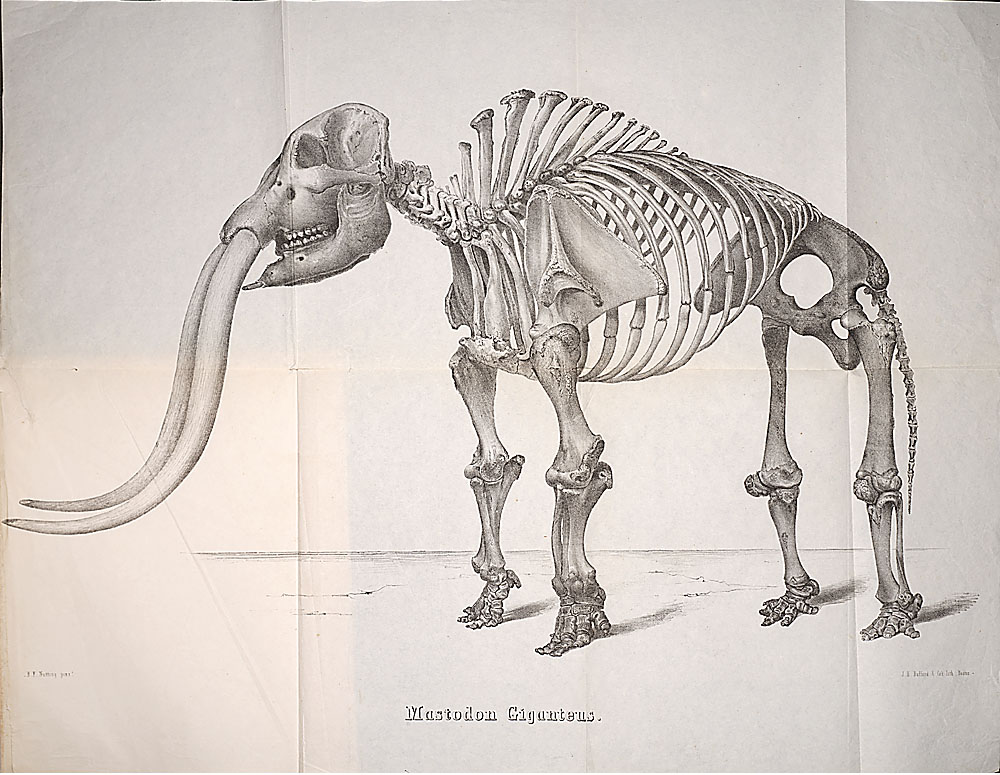
Mastodon, 1852

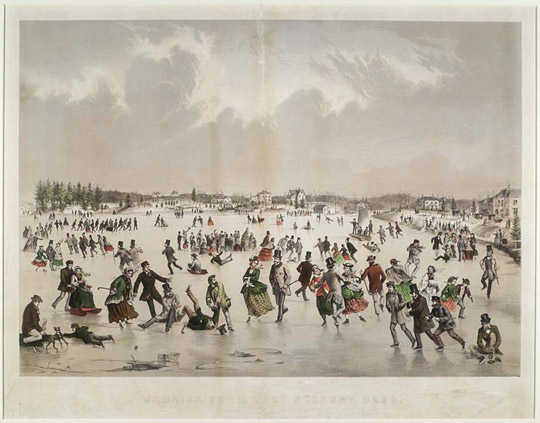
Jamaica Pond, 1859

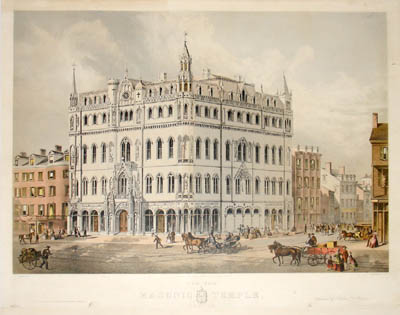
Masonic Temple, Boston, 1865 (designed by M.G. Wheelock)

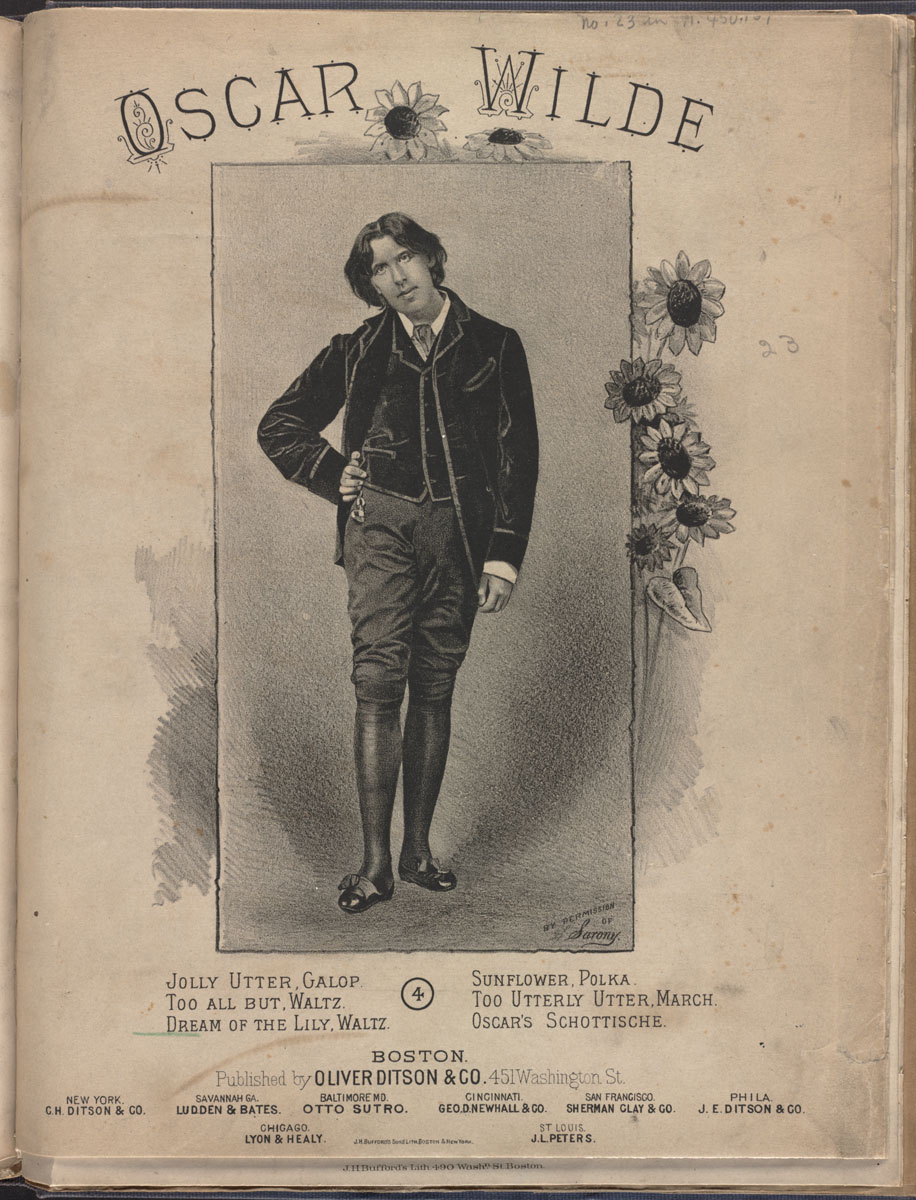
Sheet music (Oscar Wilde)

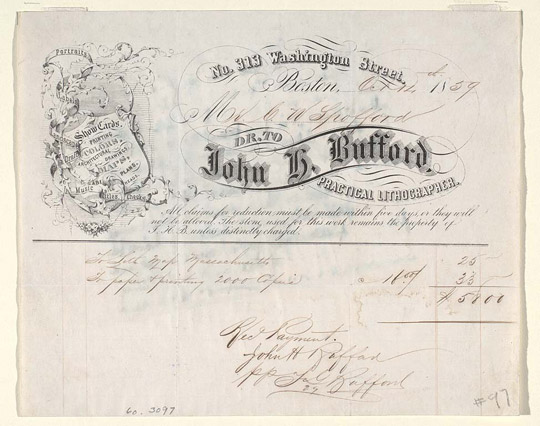
"John H. Bufford. Practical Lithographer. Washington St., Boston"

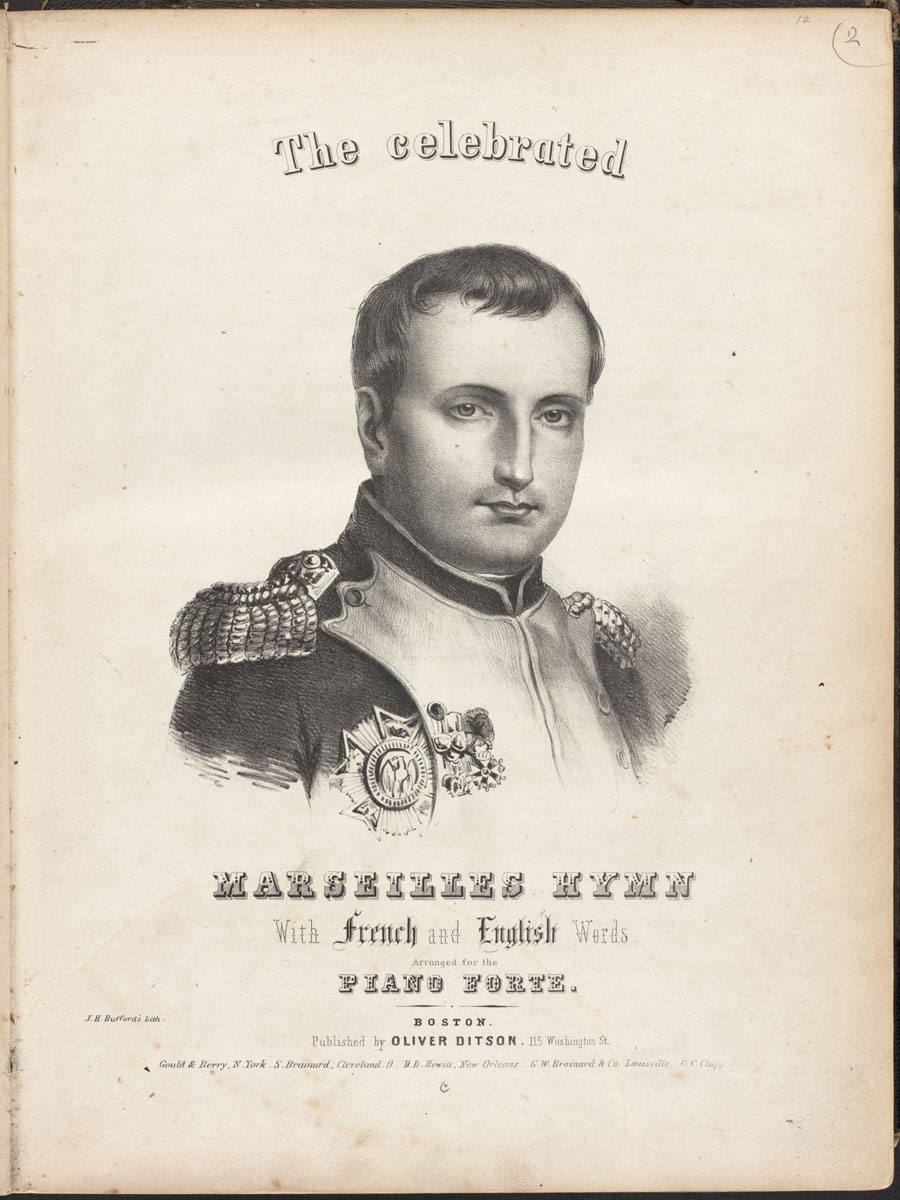
Sheet music (Napoleon)

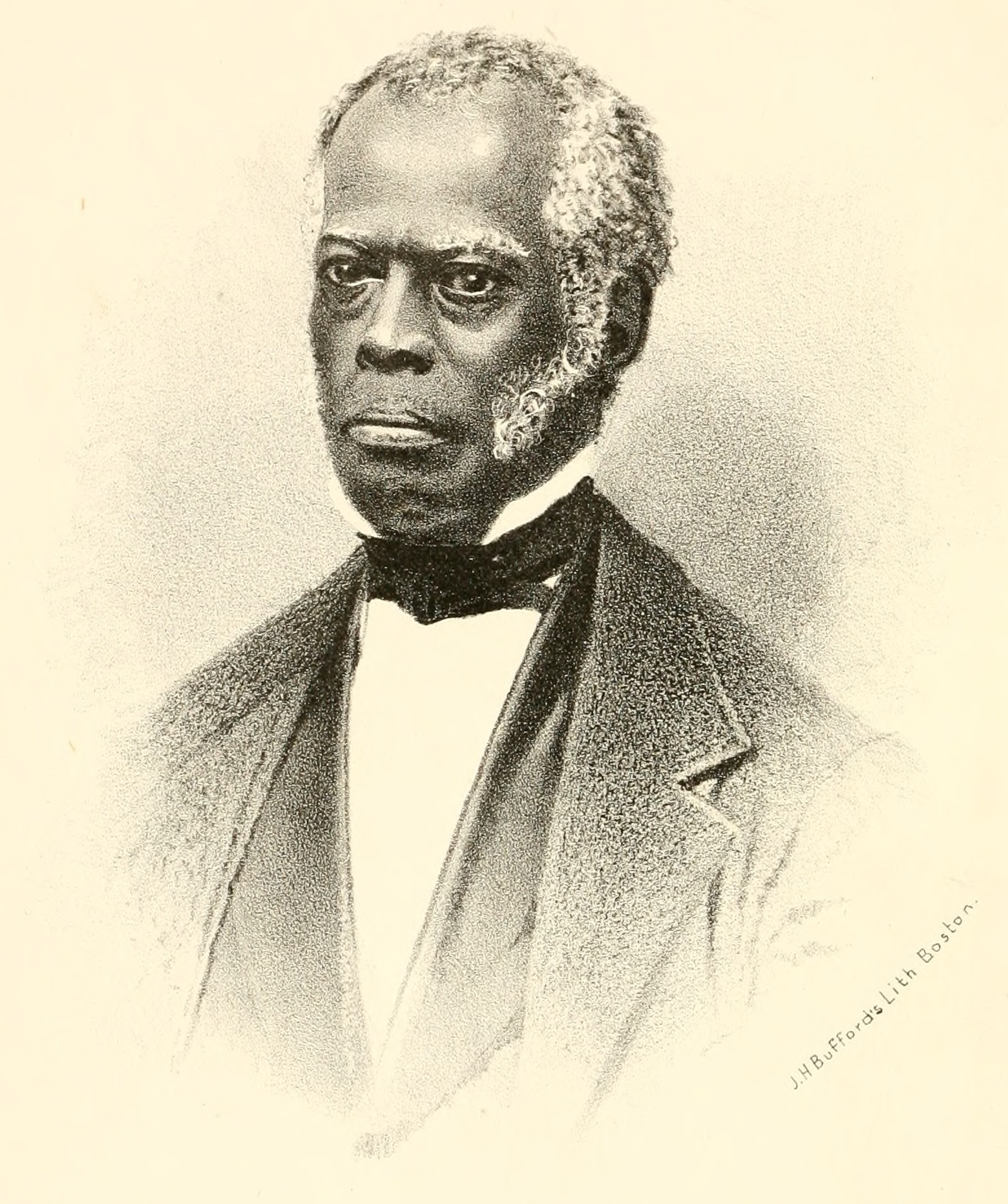
Lunsford Lane, c. 1863

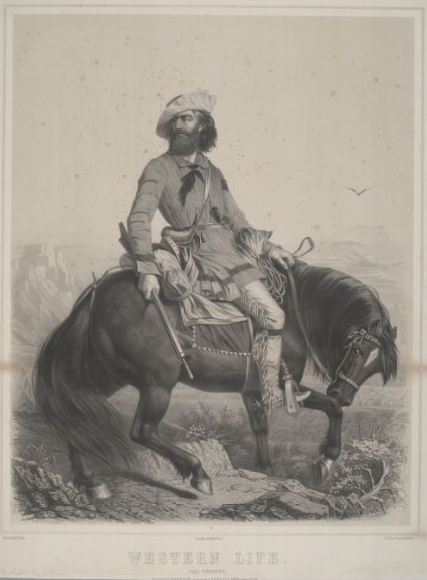
Western life: the trapper, 19th century

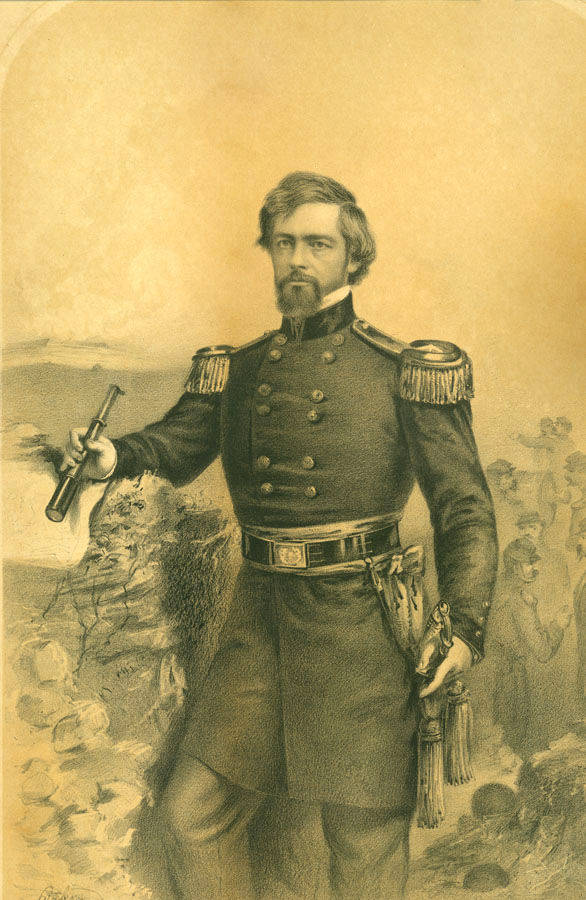
Brigadier General Isaac Ingalls Stevens, 1861 (Washington State Historical Society)
