= Benjamin F. Nutting =

American artist (c.1803–1887)

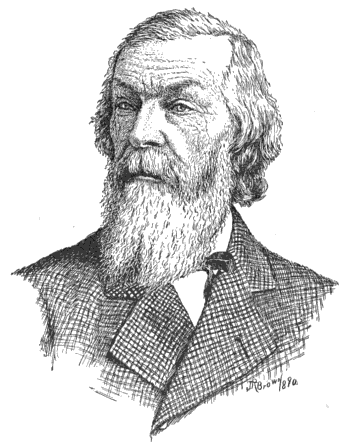
Portrait of B.F. Nutting

Benjamin Franklin Nutting (c. 1803 – 1887) was an artist in Boston, Massachusetts, in the 19th century. He taught drawing in local schools, published do-it-yourself drawing instruction materials, and showed his artwork in several exhibitions.

== Biography ==
Nutting graduated from the Boston Latin School in 1816. He began working as an artist in Boston around 1826, painting portraits, and also drawing "on stone for lithographers" such as Pendleton's Lithography (ca.1828-1833); Annin & Smith; and B.W. Thayer & Co.

He taught drawing at the Chauncy-Hall School; and the Roxbury Latin School (c. 1876). As a teacher and artist, he was associated with the Boston Artists' Association. He also worked as "an artist, drawing teacher and lithographer" for Francis Oakley in Boston, probably in the 1850s-1860s. In 1880, he taught drawing/painting on West Street.

Nutting showed frequently in art exhibitions. His work appeared at Boston's American Gallery of Fine Arts (1835); and the Boston Art Association (1844) Several of his paintings were displayed in 1851–1852 in the gallery of the New England Art Union. He exhibited 2 oil paintings in the 1847 exhibit of the Massachusetts Charitable Mechanic Association; and his watercolor "A New England Farm" was included in the association's 1884 exhibit. His watercolor "Apple Branch and Jug" was included in the 1880 exhibition of American Art at the Museum of Fine Arts, Boston.; and his watercolor "A New England Kitchen" was exhibited in the Lydian Gallery, Chicago, in 1880. He also showed works at the Boston Art Club (1873, 1875–1876).

== Images ==
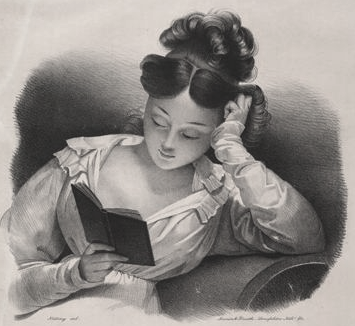
La Lecture. Drawn by Nutting; published by Annin & Smith-Senefelder Lithography, c. 1830

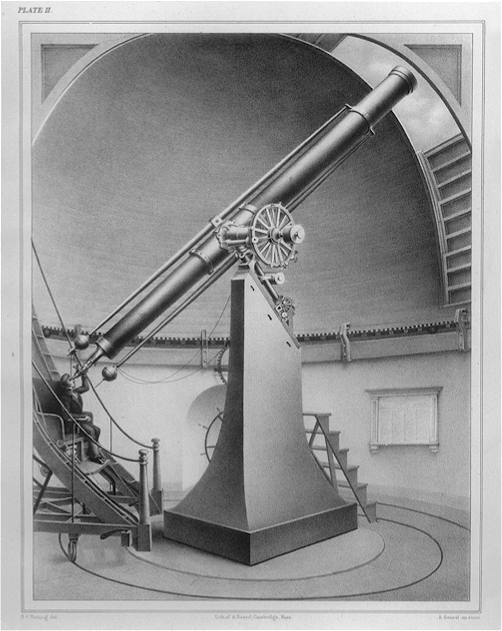
Cambridge U.S. Equatoreal. Drawn by Nutting; lithograph by A. Sonrel, 1849

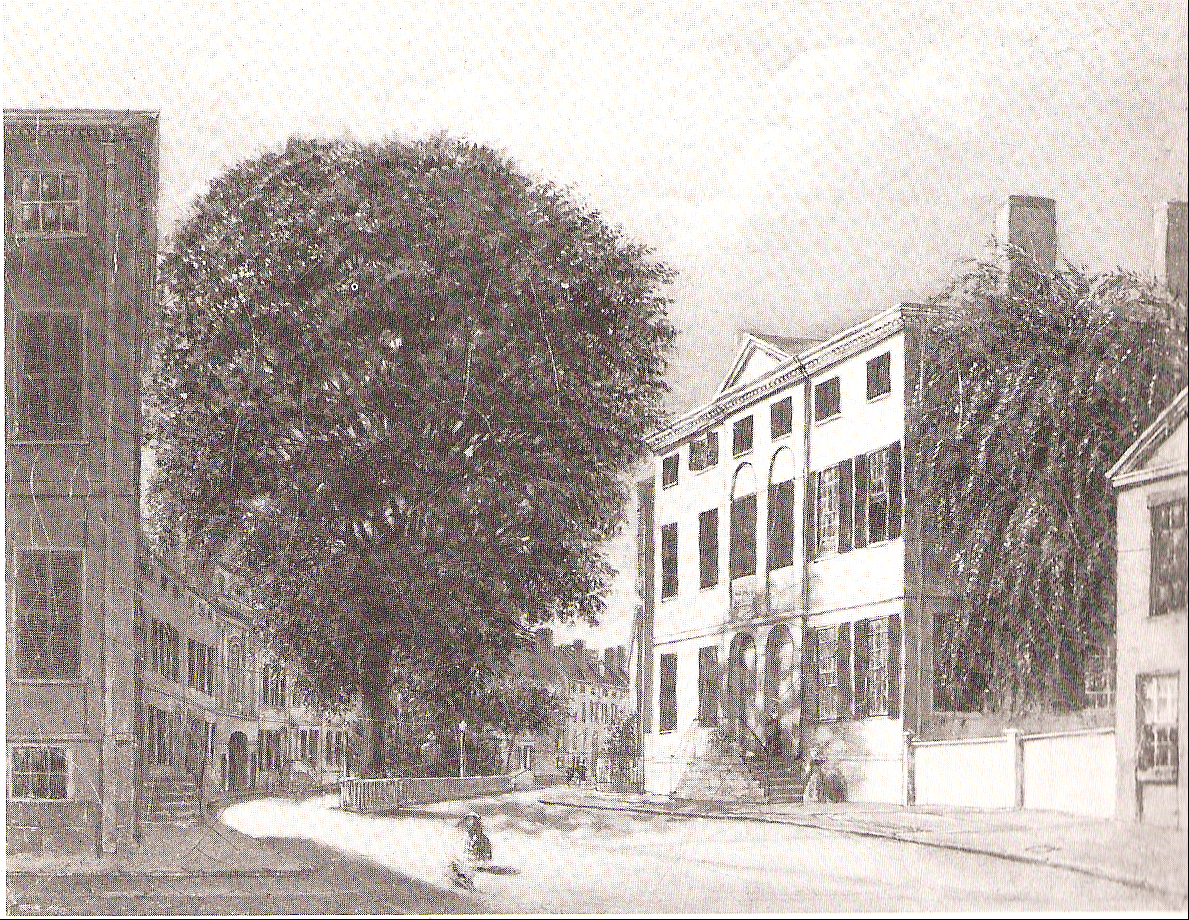
Franklin Place, Boston, c. 1850

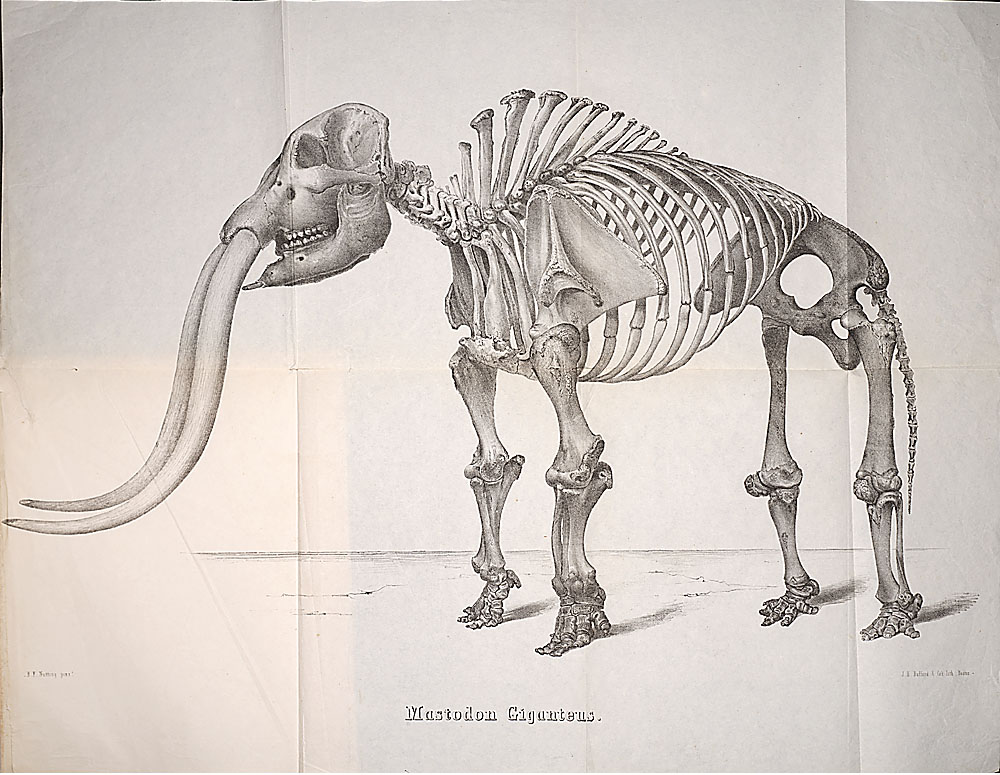
Plate from: J.C. Warren. The Mastodon giganteus of North America, 1852

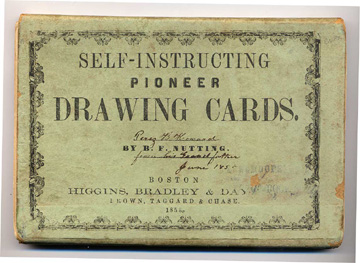
Self Instructing Pioneer Drawing Cards, 1856

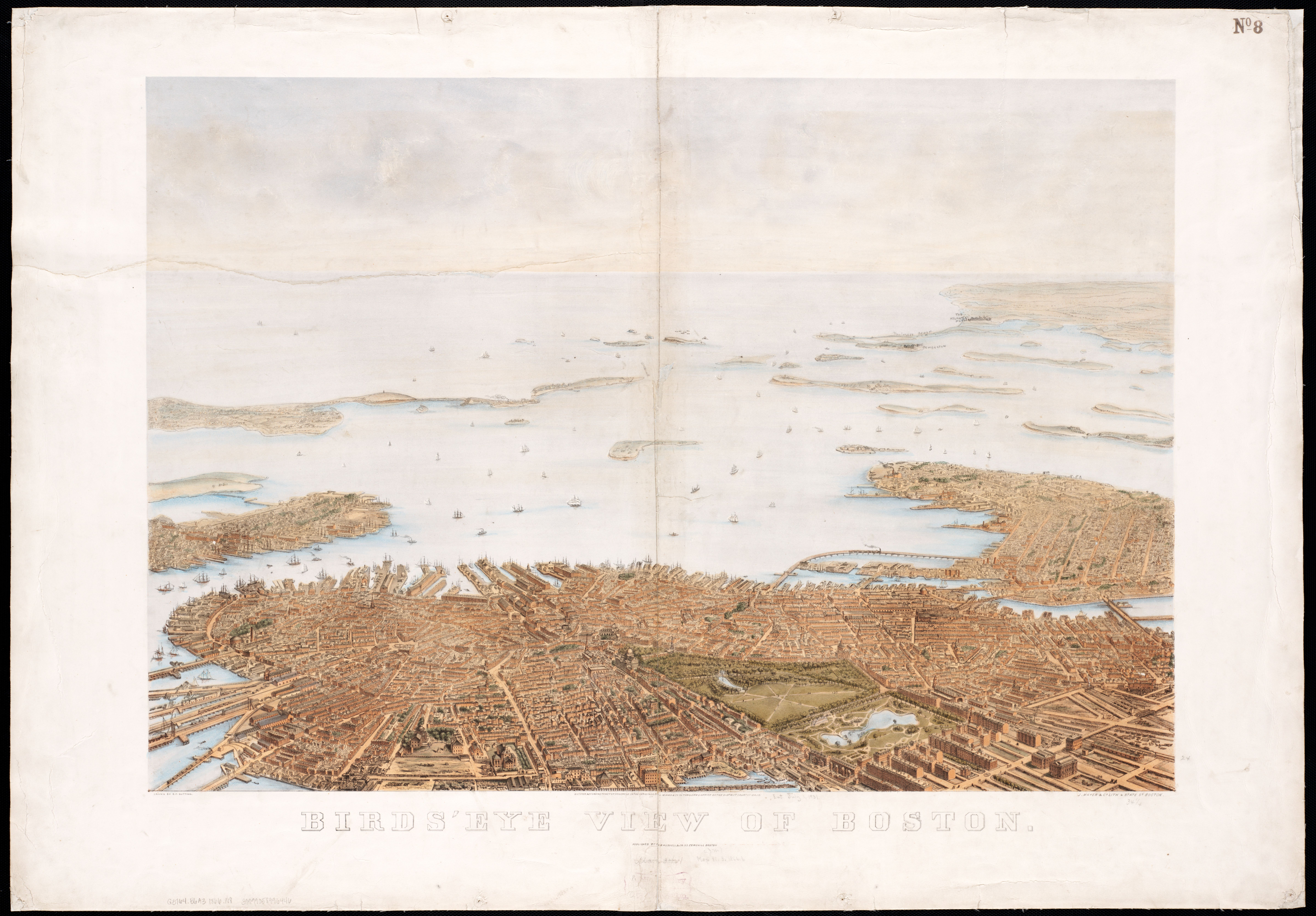
Bird's eye view of Boston, 1866. Drawn by Nutting; published by B.B. Russell & Co.

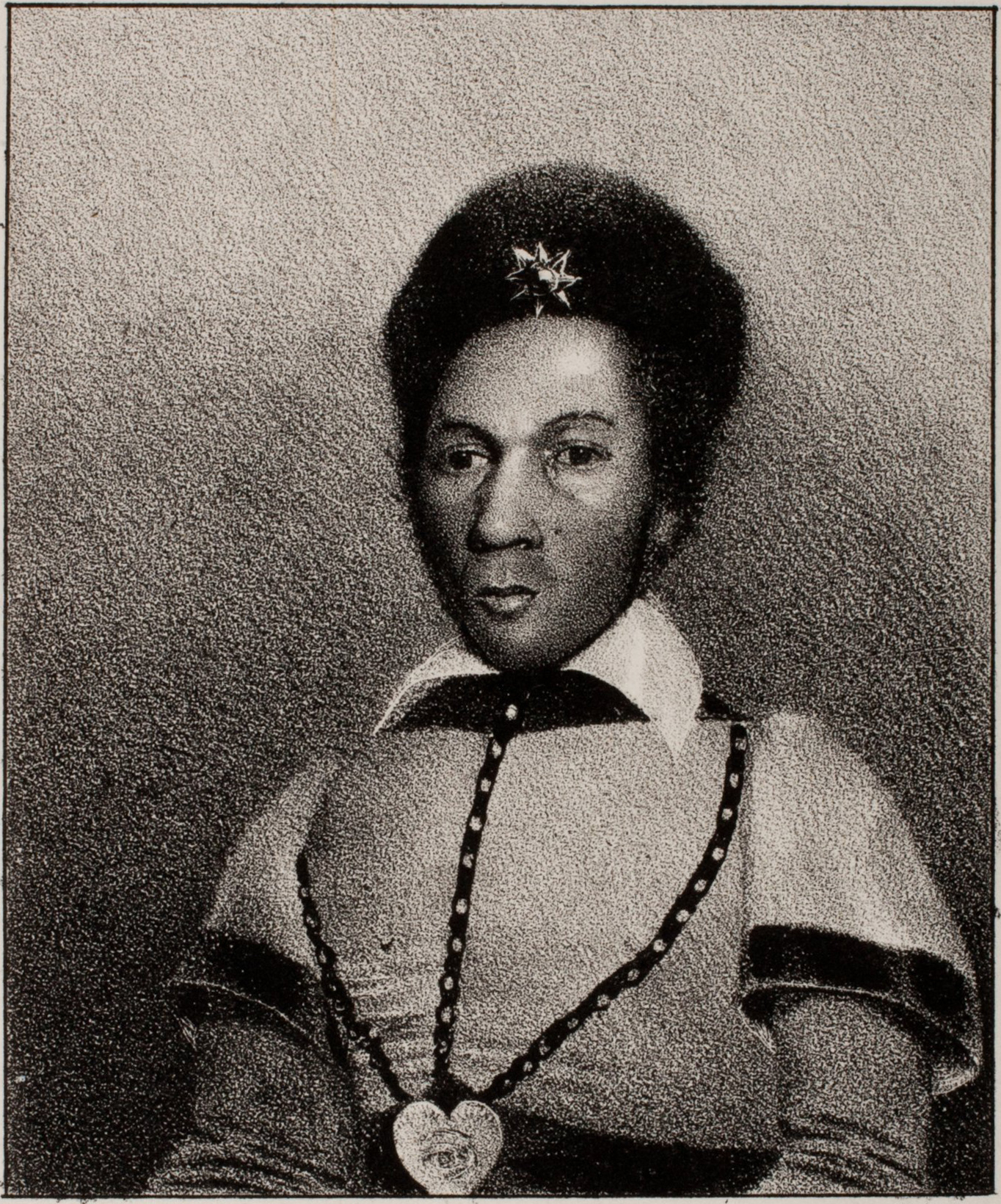
Robert Benjamin Lewis, c. 1830, published by Pendleton's Lithography
