= Pendleton's Lithography =

Lithographic print studio in 19th-century Boston, Massachusetts, US

Coordinates: 42°21′22.42″N 71°3′35.69″W

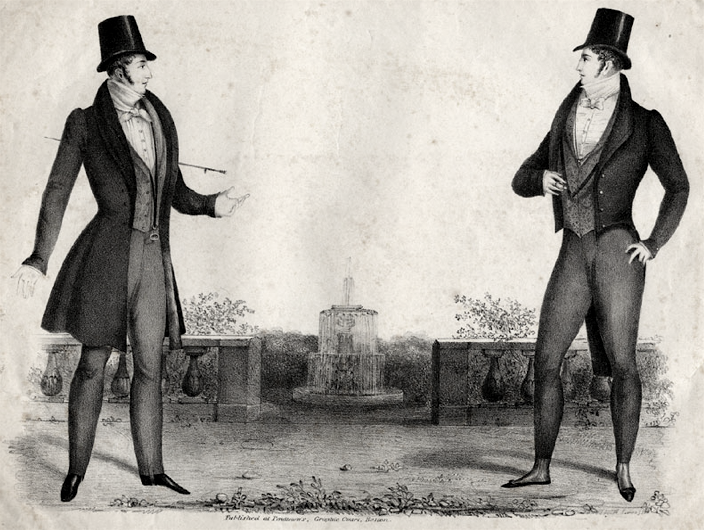
"Published at Pendleton's, in Graphic Court, Boston", c. 1820s. Graphic Court was located near Washington St. and Franklin St.

Pendleton's Lithography (1825–1836) was a lithographic print studio in 19th-century Boston, Massachusetts, established by brothers William S. Pendleton (1795-1879) and John B. Pendleton (1798-1866). Though relatively short-lived, in its time the firm was prolific, printing portraits, landscape views, sheet music covers, and numerous other illustrations. The Pendleton's work might be characterized by its generosity—each print contains a maxima of visual information designed for graphic reproduction.

== History ==
Originally from New York, the Pendleton brothers at the outset of their professional lives were affiliated with Charles Willson Peale and Rembrandt Peale in Philadelphia. On arrival in Boston, William Pendleton first worked as an engraver with Abel Bowen.

The Pendleton brothers began their own shop in 1825, when William "acquired some lithographic materials from a merchant named Thaxter who had brought them to Boston from Europe but who did not know how to use them. W.S. Pendleton communicated with his brother, then in Europe, about the matter, and the latter on his return not only brought back considerable stone and other materials, but also what was more important several men familiar with the process." The Pendletons became "the pioneers of the lithographic art in Boston."

A number of artists worked for the Pendletons, including Fitz Henry Lane, John H. Bufford, Seth Cheney, Nathaniel Currier, Thomas Edwards, B.F. Nutting, George Loring Brown, Benjamin Champney, Alexander Jackson Davis, David Claypoole Johnston, William Rimmer, and John W. A. Scott. Also "associated with the Pendleton workshop: Mary Jane Derby (later Peabody), Eliza Ann Farrar, Eliza Goodridge, Orra White Hitchcock, Louisa Davis Minot, Eliza Susan Quincy, Catherine Scollay, ... Margaret Snow (who married William S. Pendleton in 1831)," and probably Sophia Peabody.

In 1826 the brothers won "a silver medal for the best specimen of lithography" at the annual exhibition of the Franklin Institute, Philadelphia. In addition to critical praise, the studio's work garnered public approval. Of an 1832 portrait of Andrew Jackson, painted by Ralph E. W. Earl, and printed by Pendleton's, one newspaper notes: "We have received a lithographic engraving of Mr. Earle's picture of Gen. Jackson. ...The whole appears to be finely executed. The engraving is by Pendleton of Boston -- we have never seen any lithography equal to it."

The studio occupied successive addresses in Boston: Harvard Place (1825-1826); Graphic Court (1826 - c. 1832); and finally Washington Street (c. 1836).

In 1828, John Pendleton left Boston. William continued on until "July 1836 when ... [he] sold out to his bookkeeper, Thomas Moore." According to one historian, after William's departure the staff and operations of the business he'd established remained in place—"for all practical purposes it was the Pendleton operation under a new name"—until 1840 "when Moore in turn sold out to Benjamin W. Thayer."

== Images ==
Works printed by Pendleton's Lithography

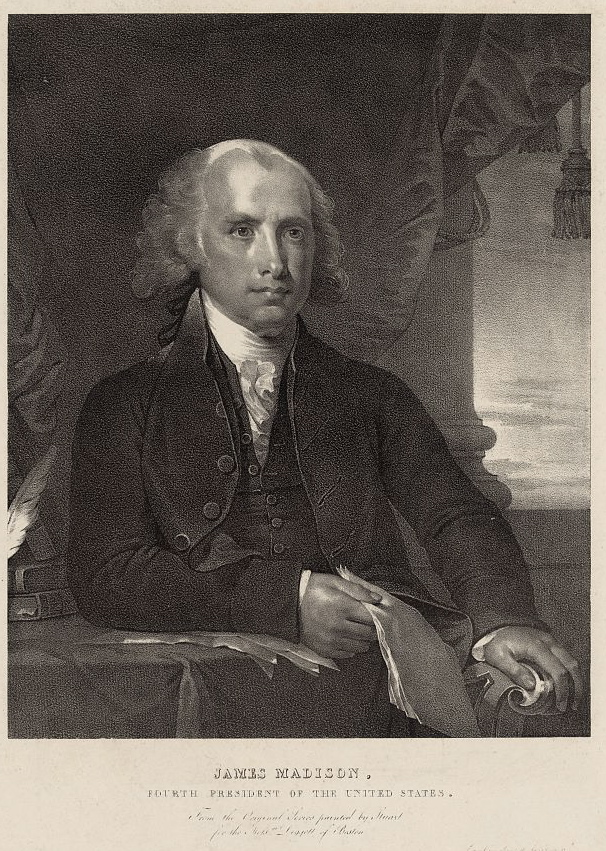
Portrait of James Madison, c. 1828

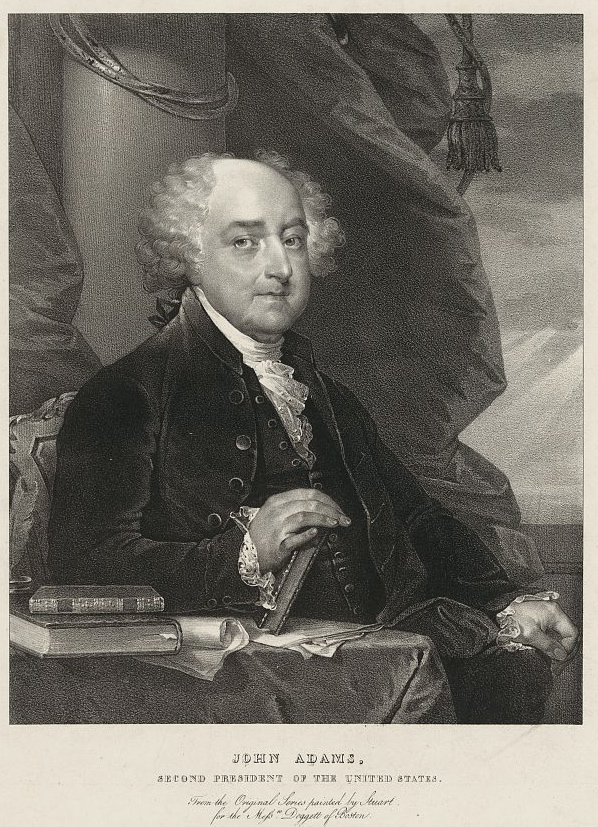
Portrait of John Adams, c. 1828

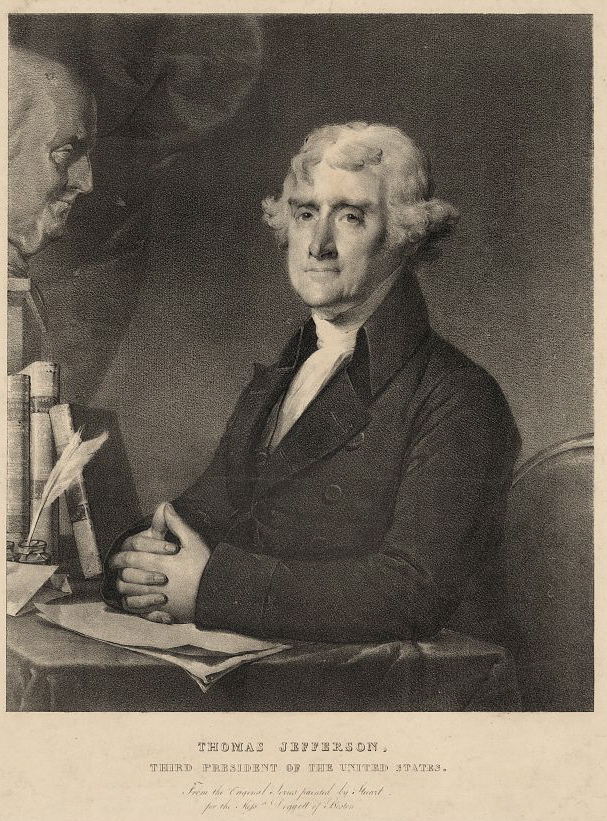
Portrait of Thomas Jefferson, c. 1828

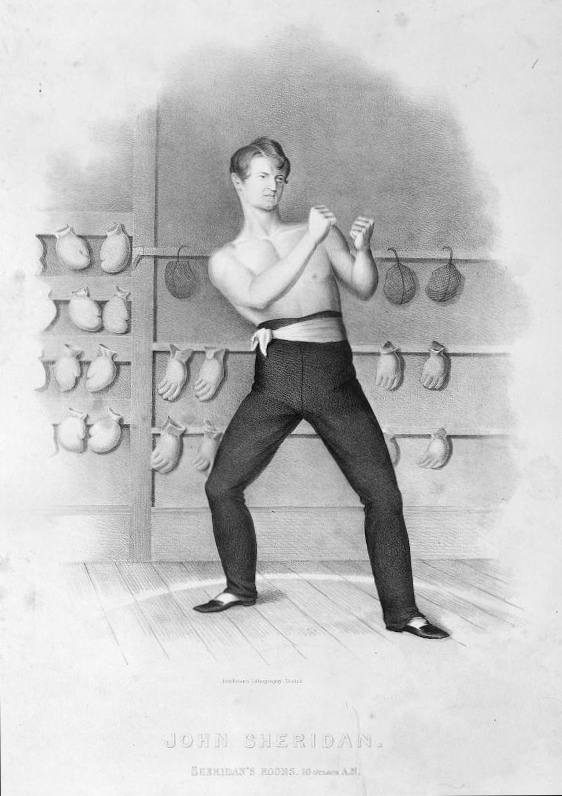
Portrait of John Sheridan

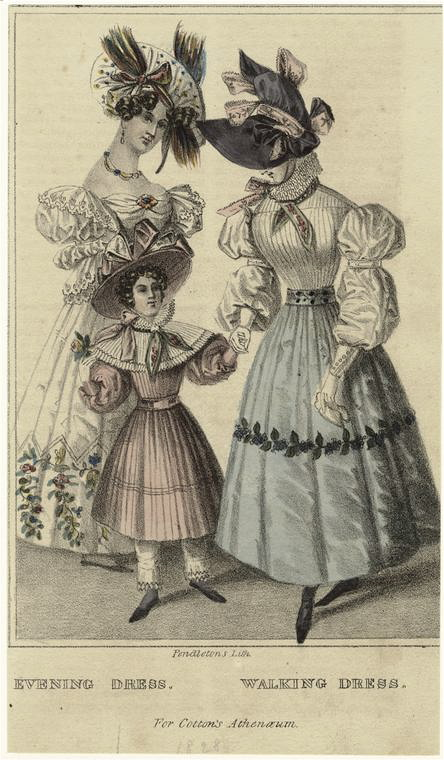
"Evening Dress, Walking Dress", c. 1820s (courtesy New York Public Library)

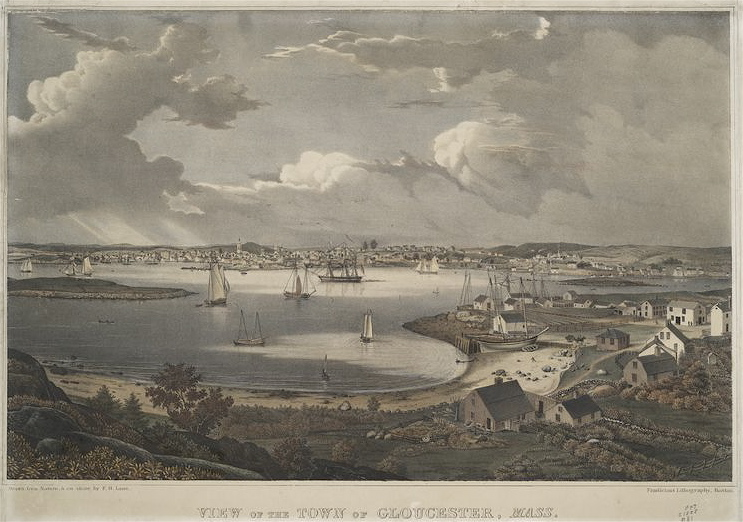
Gloucester, Mass.; drawing by F.H. Lane, 1836

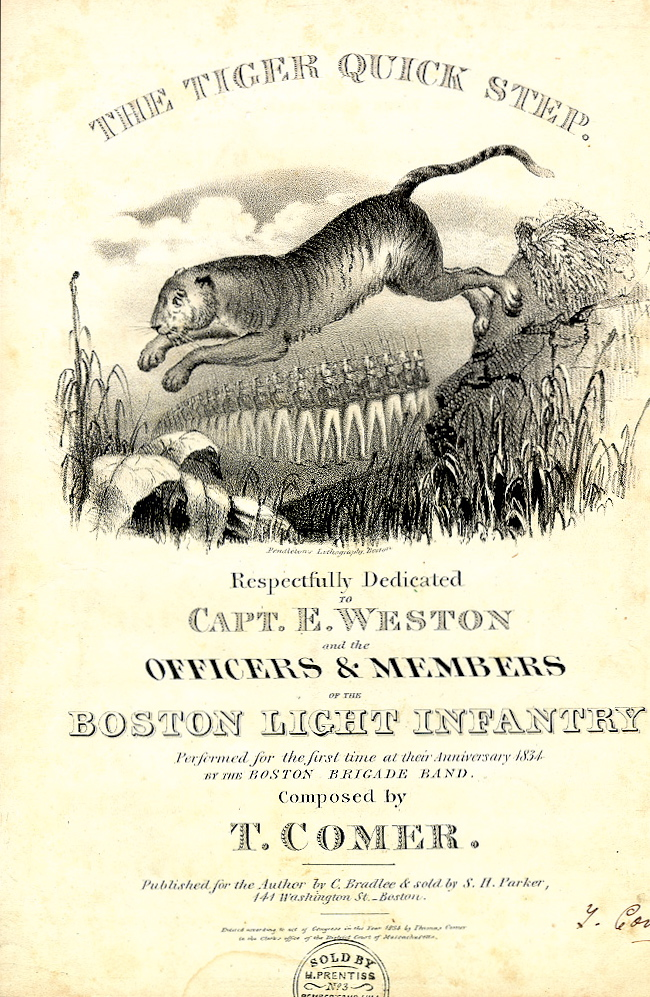
"Tiger Quick Step: ... dedicated to Capt. E. Weston and the ... Boston Light Infantry: performed for the first time ... by the Boston Brigade Band; composed by T. Comer", 1834

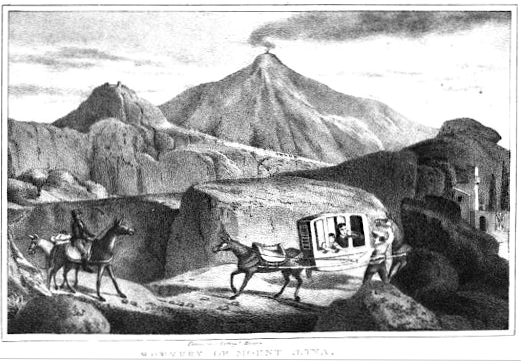
Mt. Aetna, from Bigelow's Travels in Malta, 1831

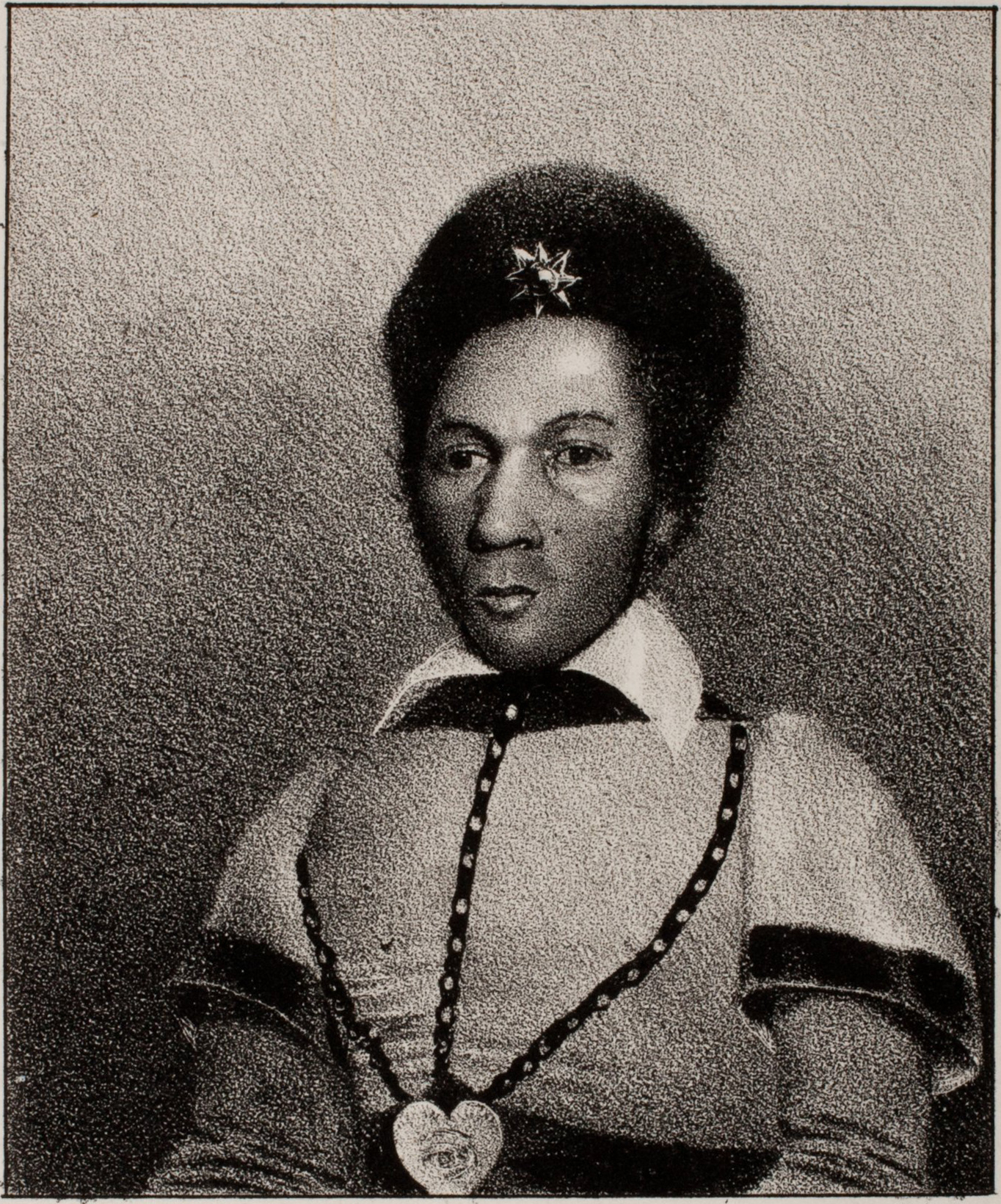
Portrait of Robert Benjamin Lewis by Benjamin F. Nutting, c. 1830
