= William Oakes =

William Oakes may refer to:

- William Oakes (botanist) (1799–1848), American botanist
- William H. Oakes (died 1890), American music publisher
- Will Oakes (born 1999), Scottish rugby league player
