= Robert Benjamin Lewis =

American historian

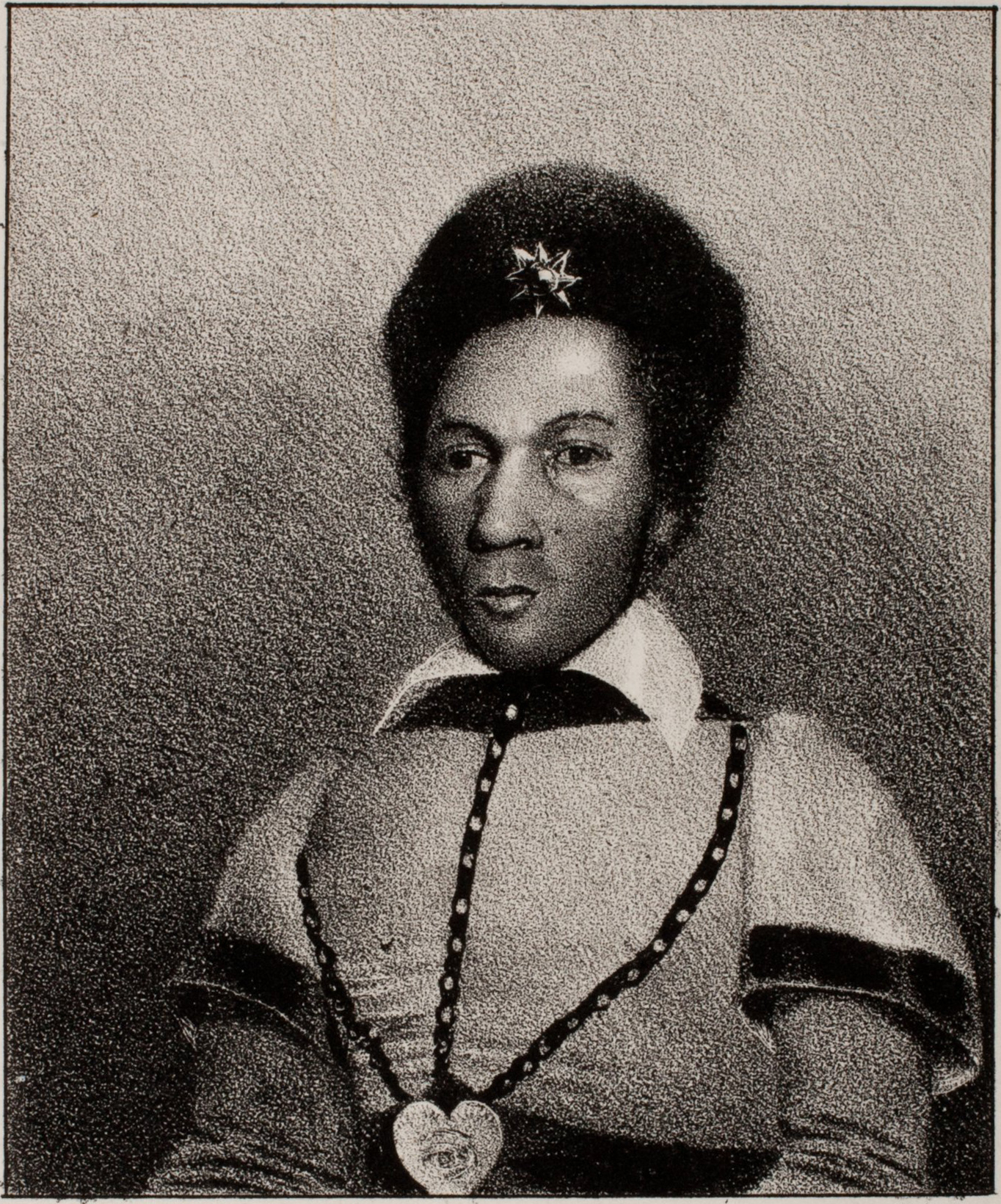
- Portrait by Benjamin F. Nutting published by Pendleton's Lithography circa 1830
- Born: 1802; Gardiner, Maine, USA
- Died: February 1858 (aged 55–56); Haiti
- Occupations: author, ethnologist, inventor, entrepreneur

Robert Benjamin Lewis (1802 - February 1858) was a writer of mixed African-American and Native American descent known for writing Light and Truth. He also was an entrepreneur, successfully marketing hair oil and other commodities, and also held three United States patents.

== Personal life ==
Aside from his writings, little is known about Lewis's life. He was born in 1802 in the portion of Pittston, Maine, that later became the city of Gardiner. He was probably the eldest son of Matthias Lewis and Lucy (Stockbridge) Lewis, who announced their intention to marry in Pittston on July 28, 1800.

It is assumed that Matthias Lewis was either a Mohegan from southern Rhode Island or a Pequot from the area around New London and Montville, Connecticut. On October 26, 1806, a 27-year-old sailor named Mathias Lewis from Kennebec County, Maine (Maine was a part of Massachusetts until it was admitted to the Union in 1820), appeared at the United States Customs House in New London, Connecticut, and received a Seamen's Protection Certificate or protection papers; the certificate (no. 3468) describes him as being five feet, six inches tall with a "colored" complexion.

Lucy Stockbridge was a daughter of one Isaac Hazard Stockbridge, an African kidnapped when he was a child (in about 1740) and purchased by Dr. Silvester Gardiner of Boston, a wealthy physician, pharmaceutical manufacturer and land developer of Maine. Stockbridge, known as "Bad Hazard," did not take kindly to being enslaved. Described as "a bad fellow", Hazard had attempted to burn down Dr. Gardiner's house, and was successful in choking to death one of Gardiner's horses. After an unsuccessful attempt at poisoning Gardiner's family, Hazard was exiled to Gardiner's holdings near Pittston. Lucy, born in 1769, was a daughter of Hazard by his wife Cooper Loring, whom he married in 1765.

Although Lewis' daughter stated that her paternal grandfather was a Frenchman and her grandmother Native American, a history of the city of Gardiner avers that "All the colored people named Lewis in this vicinity are descended from Hazard."

It is known that members of the Lewis family left Gardiner in 1809, and it is known that Robert Benjamin Lewis lived at times in the cities of Augusta, and Hallowell, Maine. After some years in school, Lewis appears to have gone to sea, as many did during that time. His daughter stated that Lewis served in the War of 1812, probably as a cabin boy on a privateer. However, according to newspaper accounts, he expressed a desire to become a missionary to Africa and preach the Gospel to the indigenous people there. He may have been helped by the Maine Missionary Society of Hallowell. This group of Congregationalist ministers and laypeople had been organized to facilitate the spread of the Gospel by supporting missions and ministers throughout Maine. Although information has not yet surfaced to show that Lewis was one of those missionaries, after his death "it was said ... that the Congregational Church in Hallowell had, in consequence of the intelligence he had manifested in youth, obtained for him an education with a view to his becoming a missionary to Africa." Nothing yet has been found to show that Lewis was ever licensed as a preacher or ordained as a minister; however, he brought away from his studies a thorough knowledge of the Bible as well as classical history.

Lewis was married twice: first to Mrs. Wealthia Ann Jones in New York City in late 1828, and secondly, to eighteen-year-old Mary Freeman Huston, the fourth of nine children of an escaped slave from Virginia who became a prosperous farmer in Brunswick, Maine, at the Charles Street Baptist Church in Boston, on March 17, 1835. Lewis is known to have had three sons and seven daughters from his second marriage.

Some scholars have also suggested that Lewis is the father of Edmonia Lewis, a well-known African/Native American sculptor, but their relationship has never been confirmed.

== Entrepreneur and inventor ==
Known as a "jack-of-all-trades," Lewis made his living by engaging in a variety of odd jobs. At various times in his life, he was a sailor, ship's cook and steward, whitewasher, and day laborer.

Robert Benjamin Lewis held three United States patents, making him one of the few nineteenth century African American inventors who were able to patent their inventions or improvements to existing manufacturing processes. In his application for a United States Patent dated April 11, 1836, Lewis stated that "I, Robert Benjamin Lewis of Hallowell, in the county of Kennebec, and state of Maine, have invented a new and useful machine for the picking of oakum and hair." "Oakum" is defined as "loosely twisted hemp or jute fiber impregnated with tar or a tar derivative." During the days of the sailing ship, hemp ropes were used as rigging on board. Although coated with pine tar and varnish, the coating would eventually wear out and the rigging would have to be replaced. Since little was wasted, the old rope would be recycled by unraveling the strands until the rope itself was reduced to single threads and then loosely rewound, resulting in "oakum", which was used to caulk the seams of wooden ships in order to make them watertight. "Picking oakum"—the actual business in unraveling the strands of rope so that they could be prepared for caulking—was a tedious, sticky job generally delegated to those workers lowest in the pecking order. The machine would do the work of the picker—essentially teeth on a cylinder turned by a crank would separate the strands of the old rope to produce oakum. The patent was awarded on June 25, 1836. The "hair picker" became a mainstay of Maine shipyards, the original design being reworked and refined over the years.

Decorative feathers—ostrich, peacock, egret, and the like—were used to adorn the wardrobe of the fashionably dressed, and when the garments were sent out to be laundered and cleaned, the feathers would go also. On June 27, 1840, Robert Lewis assigned U.S. Patent no. 1655 to New York City businessman John H. Stevens; this patent was for a "Feather Renovator", or a "Machine for Cleaning and Drying Feathers", described as the "arrangement and combination of feathers by steam and steam heat" and could be used for "dressing over old feathers or preparing new feathers for any domestic purposes."

As noted above, Lewis worked for a time as a whitewasher and on February 23, 1841, was issued U.S. Patent no. 1992 for his improvement on large brushes used for whitewashing and "Such other Purposes to which the Same may be applicable." "The object of my improvements is to effectually remedy these defects and to provide, as it were, a framework in which new bristles may be inserted at a trifling expense after the old ones become unfit to use."

Lewis also successfully developed and marketed a concoction he called "Lewis' Arabian Hair Oil." An advertisement that ran in Maine newspapers during the 1840s stated "THE knowledge of this highly esteemed Oil for the Hair was obtained from a distinguished ARABIAN by the subscriber. It is used almost universally in that country, to make the hair grow long, to give it a healthy and lively appearance, and preserve its beauty to an advanced age. It is decidedly the best oil that was ever used in this or any other country for preventing the Hair from coming off, giving life to the roots, and making it grow long and soft. It also darkens it and gives a beautiful gloss .... This Oil I have not been able to obtain till now, except in very small quantities, and have used it for myself and family occasionally for two or three years. My own hair and that of my children are LIVING WITNESSES of its efficacy and which cannot be doubted. Look and see."

To show the hair treatment's claimed potency and virtue, Lewis would show off "his long black curls that reached down over his coat collar." His "long black Indiany locks" were "thoroughly greased" with his oil, and as he held the enthralled crowd spellbound with his descriptions of the potency of his product, Lewis would demonstrate its power by referring to the "glossy appearance" of his hair. He made a comfortable living from the sales of his hair oil for many years.

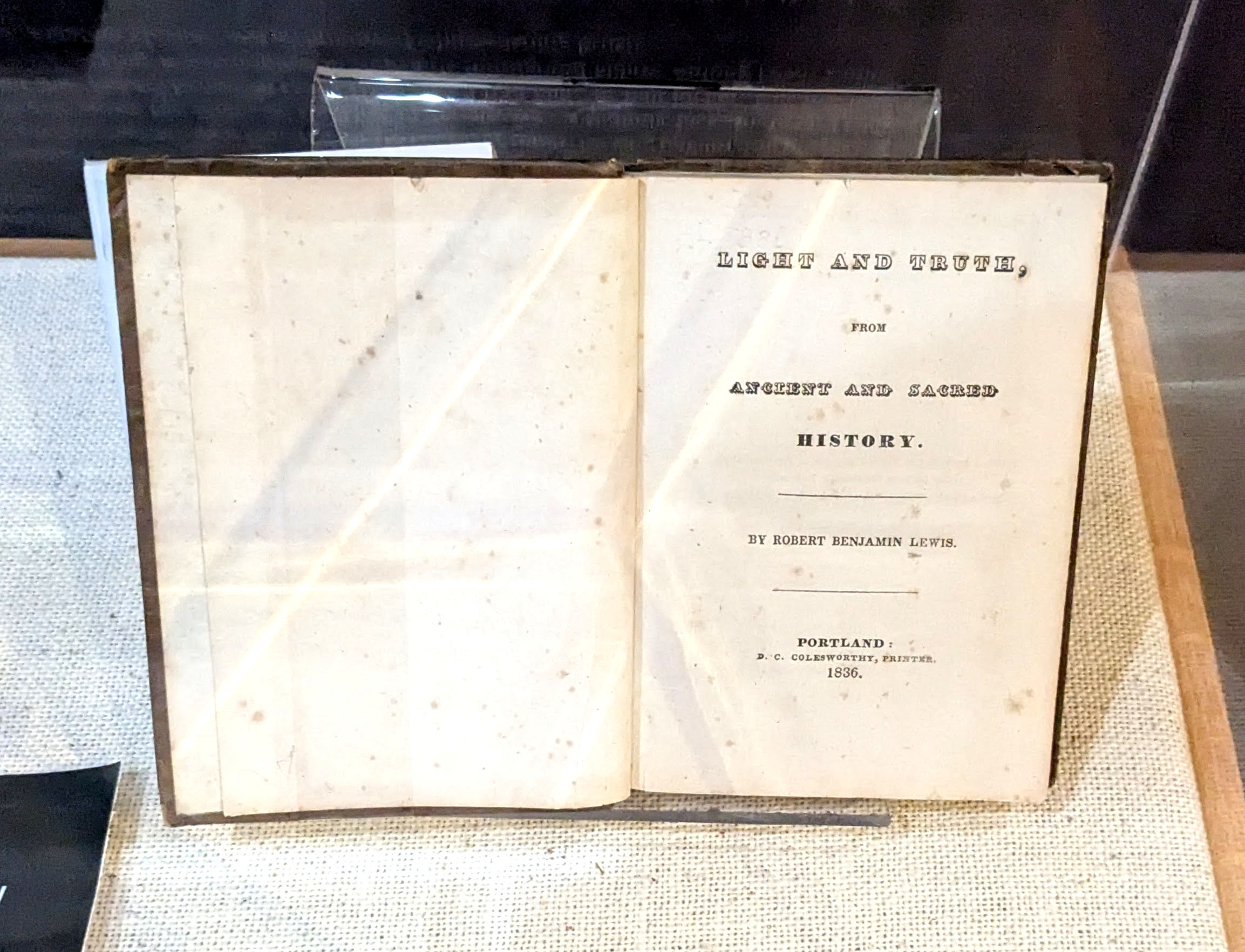
Inside a display case rests a first edition copy of the book Light and Truth by Robert Benjamin Lewis. It is open to the title page and displays the title, author, and the name of the publisher, Daniel Clement Colesworthy

== Light and Truth ==
In 1836, Robert B. Lewis ventured into the literary world by publishing a 176-page book entitled Light and Truth—the first "history book" about African Americans and Native Americans. The book was published in Portland, Maine, and printed by local bookseller and printer Daniel Clement Colesworthy. At the end of the book, Lewis noted that he hadn't said all that he wanted to, and stated that "I have in contemplation the publishing of another work which will contain much interesting matter, some of which has of necessity been excluded from these pages." He continued to collect more information, and in 1843 he decided to issue an expanded version of Light and Truth totaling four hundred pages. In November 1843, four African-American businessmen of Boston—clothier Thomas Dalton, shoemaker and old clothes dealer James Scott, junk dealer Andress V. Lewis (no relation) and shoemaker Charles H. Roberts—who called themselves the "Committee of Colored Gentlemen" purchased the copyright of the expanded version of Light and Truth and by March of the next year produced it in one volume. The printer was Charles Roberts' half-brother Benjamin F. Roberts. In 1850, on behalf of his daughter Sarah Caroline Roberts, Benjamin Roberts would bring suit against the city of Boston so that she could attend her neighborhood school, rather than the underfunded Abiel Smith School several miles away from her home. Although Roberts v. Boston was decided in favor of the city, five years later Massachusetts outlawed segregated schools.

The book itself would go through two more printings—in 1848, B. F. Roberts and the Committee reissued Light and Truth in four numbers; in 1851, a "Second Edition" was published by the Reverend Moses M. Taylor of Boston; this was essentially a reprint of the 1844 text, with a preface written by Taylor. Light and Truth can be found in many libraries—the 1844 edition produced by the Committee of Colored Gentlemen has been reprinted in two twentieth century versions—in 1970 by Kraus Reprint and most recently by Black Classic Press.

Lewis was an ethnologist, and his book Light and Truth was an African American ethnology that denounced notions of white superiority. During Lewis's life, the American school of ethnology held that non-white races were inherently inferior and argued that God created the inferior races at a different point in time than Caucasians. In Light and Truth, Lewis exposes the illegitimacy of these views, and asserted that all of human kind has a common origin.

Both an African American and Native American himself, Lewis also emphasized a shared cultural and reproductive history between African and Native Americans.

Professor John Ernest of the University of Delaware sees Lewis' work as "a study in the theological grounds of black nationalism, and an early example of black liberation theology." Lewis saw it as his mission to search "diligently ... in the quest of light, and truth, in ancient, sacred and profane history, translated by English historians ... truths that have long been concealed from the sons of Ethiopia." In his attempt to dispel the "darkness" of ignorance through "the increase of light and knowledge", Lewis was, in the words of Professor Ernest, attempting to record "the history of the community defined by white oppression without the defining terms of the white oppressors."

== Final years ==
After living for almost twenty years in the city of Hallowell, Robert Benjamin Lewis moved his family to the city of Bath, Maine, about 1848, where he built a cottage near the Sagadahoc County court house on Lincoln Street.

Lewis signed on as a ship's cook and steward on the merchantman Philip Larrabee of Bath, bound for the Haitian capital of Port-au-Prince in early 1858. Upon the ship's arrival, Lewis fell ill, and sometime during the month of February 1858 he died and was buried in Haiti.

== See also ==
- Joel W. Lewis
