= George Girdler Smith =

American engraver (1795–1878)

- Born: September 8, 1795; Danvers, Massachusetts, U.S.
- Died: December 18, 1878 (aged 83); Boston, Massachusetts, U.S.
- Occupation: Engraver
- Years active: c. 1810s–1870s
- Known for: Engravings and cartographic works in 19th-century Boston
- Notable work: Plan of Boston; engravings of Harvard College and historical scenes

George Girdler Smith (September 8, 1795 – December 18, 1878) was an engraver in Boston. He kept a studio on Washington Street. Collaborators included William B. Annin (Annin & Smith), Charles A. Knight and George H. Tappan (Smith, Knight & Tappan).

Smith was born in Danvers, Massachusetts. He belonged to several civic and social groups in Boston, including the Massachusetts Charitable Mechanic Association, Boston Light Infantry, and the Freemasons. "In the year 1819 he was initiated a Freemason in Columbian Lodge, and in 1826 became its master, holding the position, at intervals of time, for 7 years. ... He was subsequently master of the Massachusetts Lodge, and deputy grand master in 1837-1839." He died December 18, 1878, in Boston.

== Image gallery ==
Engravings by Smith

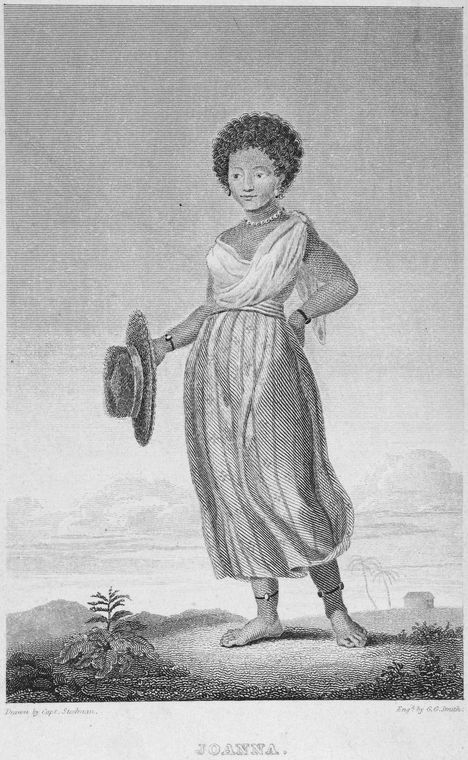
Portrait of Joanna; frontispiece to John Gabriel Stedman's Narrative of Joanna, an Emancipated Slave of Surinam (Boston: Isaac Knapp, 1838)

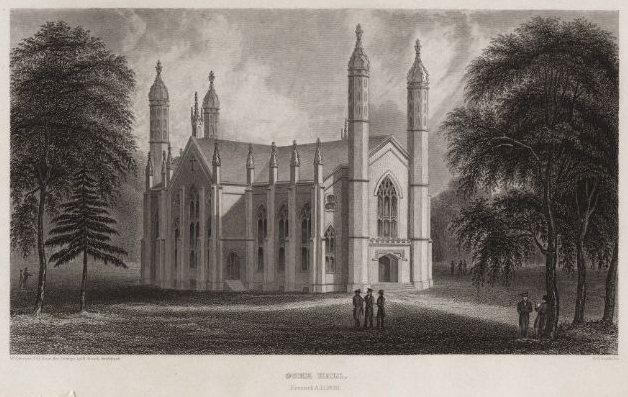
Gore Hall, Harvard College, 1840

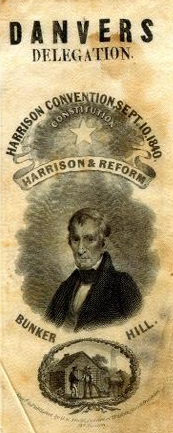
Ribbon badge, William Henry Harrison Convention, Bunker Hill, Charlestown, Massachusetts, 1840

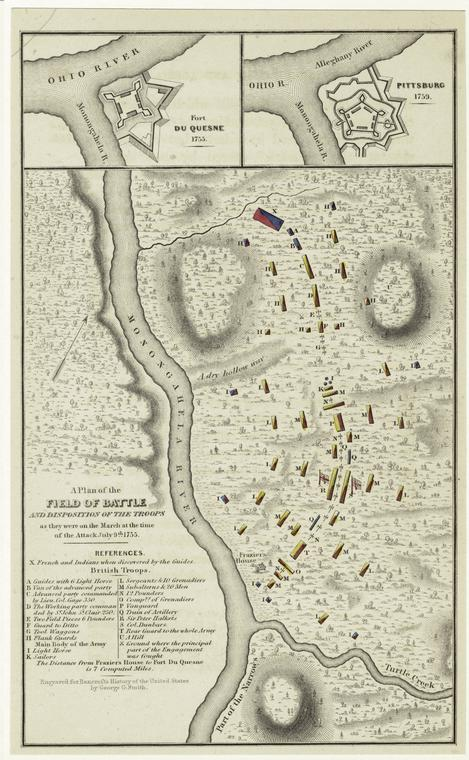
Fort Duquesne; plan of the field of battle and disposiotion of the troops: as they were on the March at the time of the attack July 9, 1755

== See also ==
- Annin & Smith

== Sources ==
- "George Girdler Smith", Memorial Biographies of the New England Historic Genealogical Society: 1871-1880, vol. 7, Boston: New England Historic Genealogical Society, 1907
