= Annin & Smith =

19th century Boston engraving firm

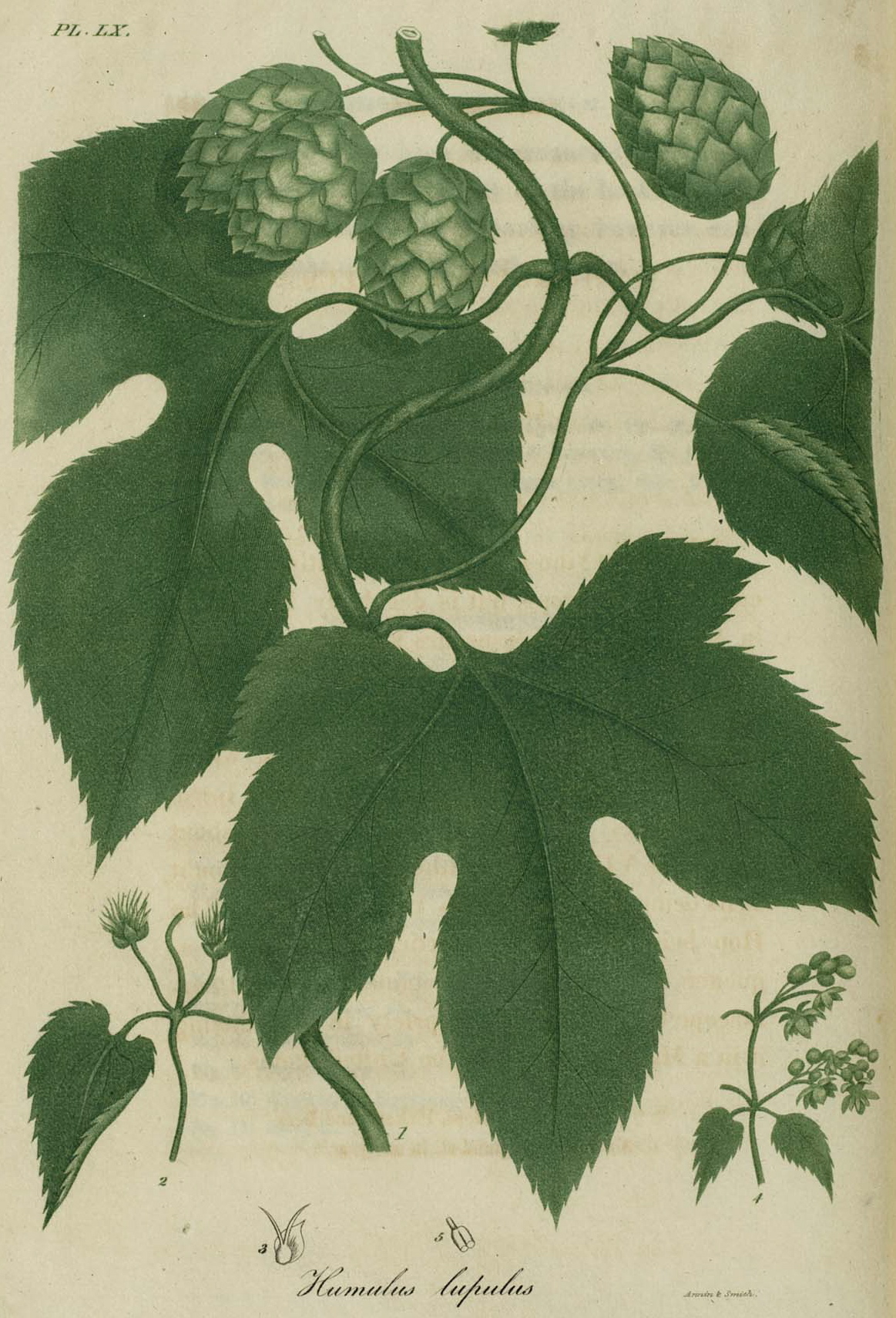
Engraving by Annin & Smith; in Bigelow's American Medical Botany, 1820

Annin & Smith (c. 1818-1837) was an engraving firm in Boston, Massachusetts, in the 19th century, established by William B. Annin and George Girdler Smith. The firm kept offices on Court Street and Cornhill.

== Image gallery ==
Engravings by Annin & Smith

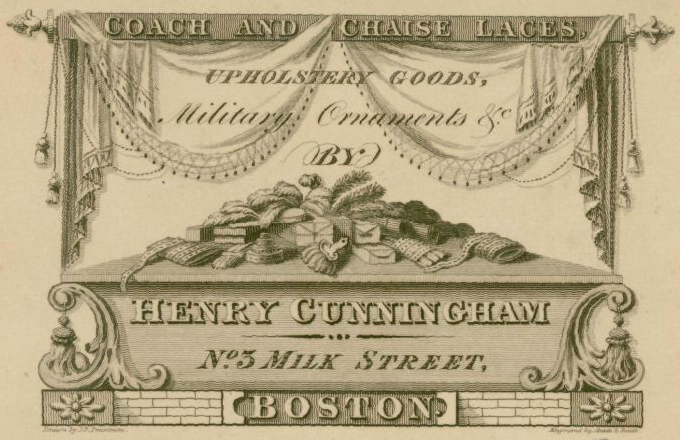
"Coach and chaise laces, upholstery goods, military ornaments &c. by Henry Cunningham no. 5 Milk Street, Boston;" drawn by J.R. Penniman c. 1820

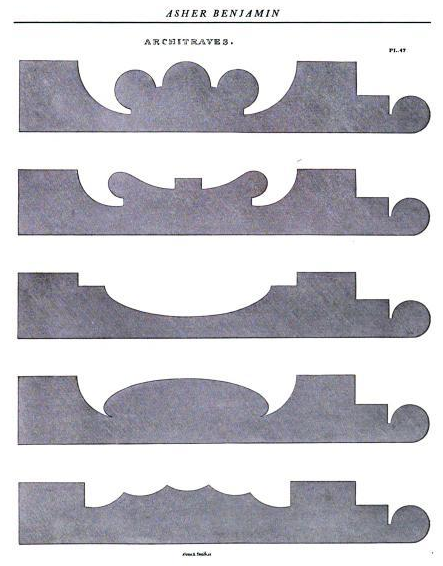
Architraves; illus. from Asher Benjamin's Practical House Carpenter, 1832

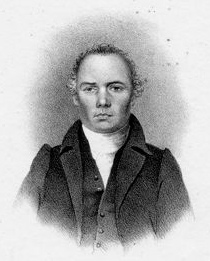
Portrait of Rev. John Lindsey. Boston: Annin, Smith & Co’s Lithography; drawn by B.F. Nutting, c .1832

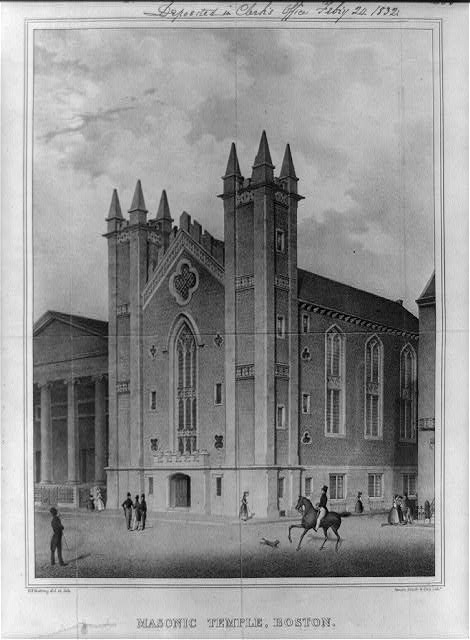
Masonic Temple, corner of Tremont Street and Temple Place, Boston, 19th century

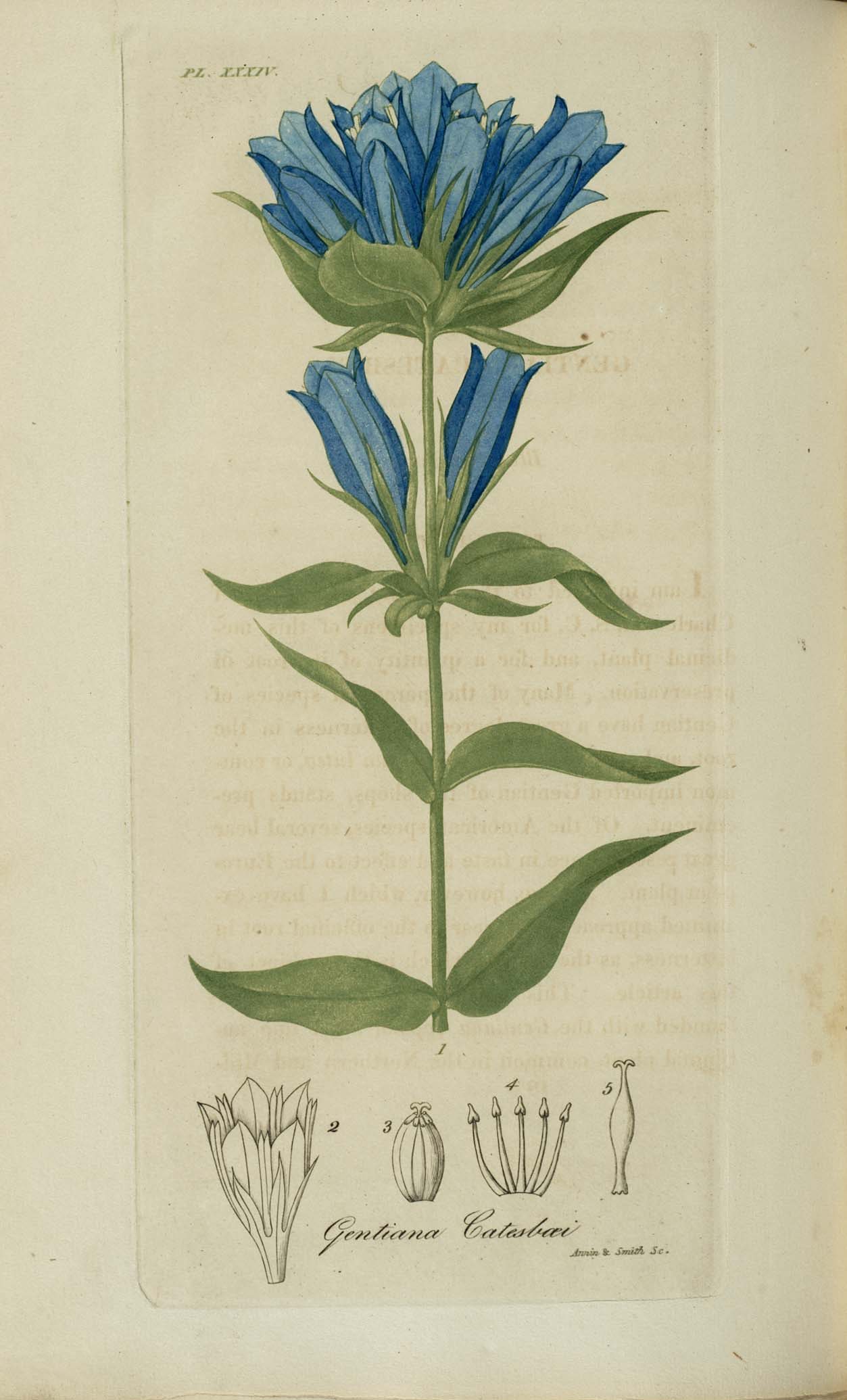
Plate 34, Bigelow's American Medical Botany (1818-1820)

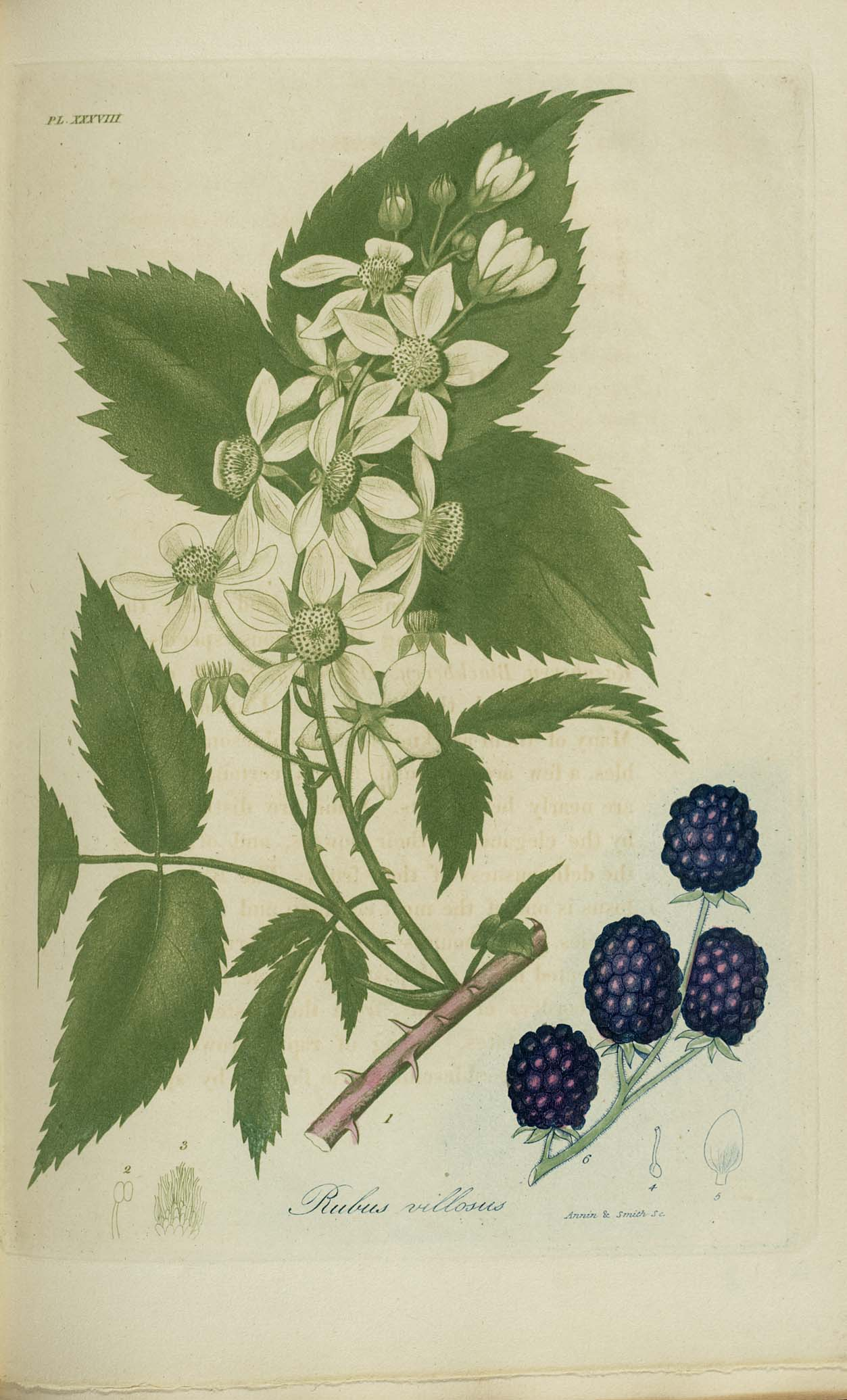
Plate 38, Bigelow's American Medical Botany (1818-1820)

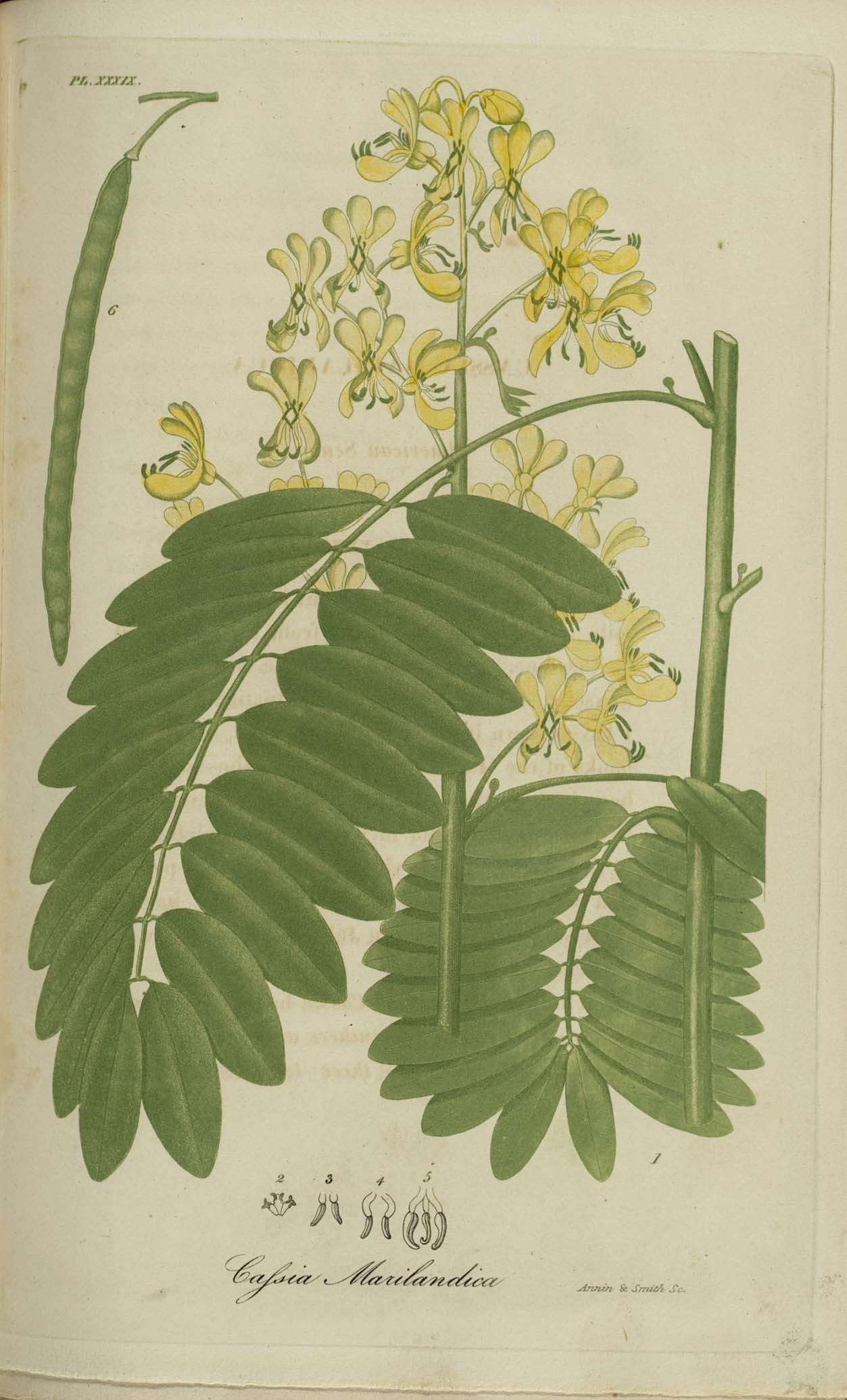
Plate 39, Bigelow's American Medical Botany (1818-1820)

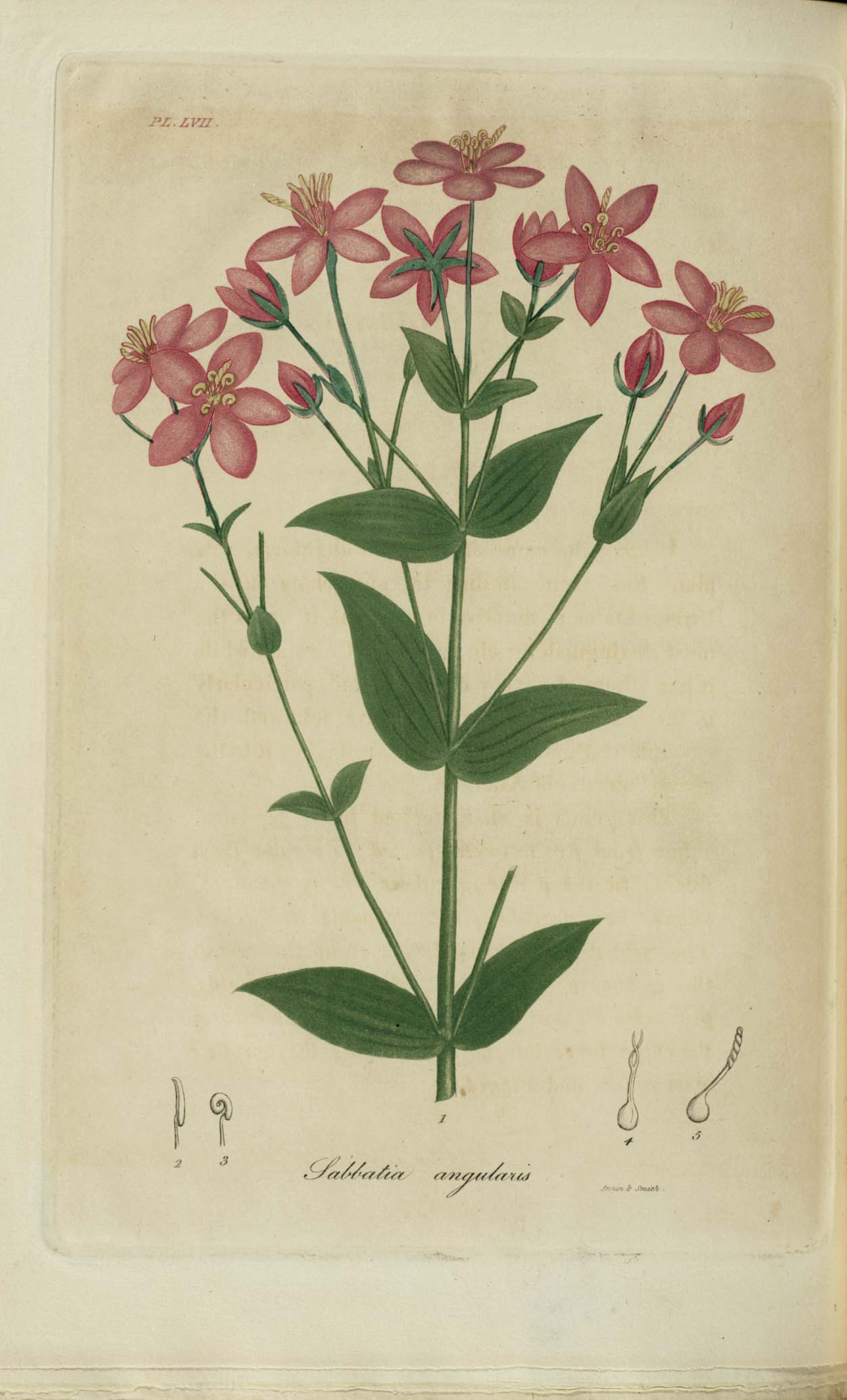
Plate 57, Bigelow's American Medical Botany (1818-1820)

== See also ==
- George Girdler Smith
