= B.W. Thayer & Co. =

B.W. Thayer & Co. was a lithographic printing studio owned by Benjamin W. Thayer (1814–1875) in Boston, Massachusetts in the 1840s–1850s. Clients included music publisher William H. Oakes.
