= William H. Oakes =

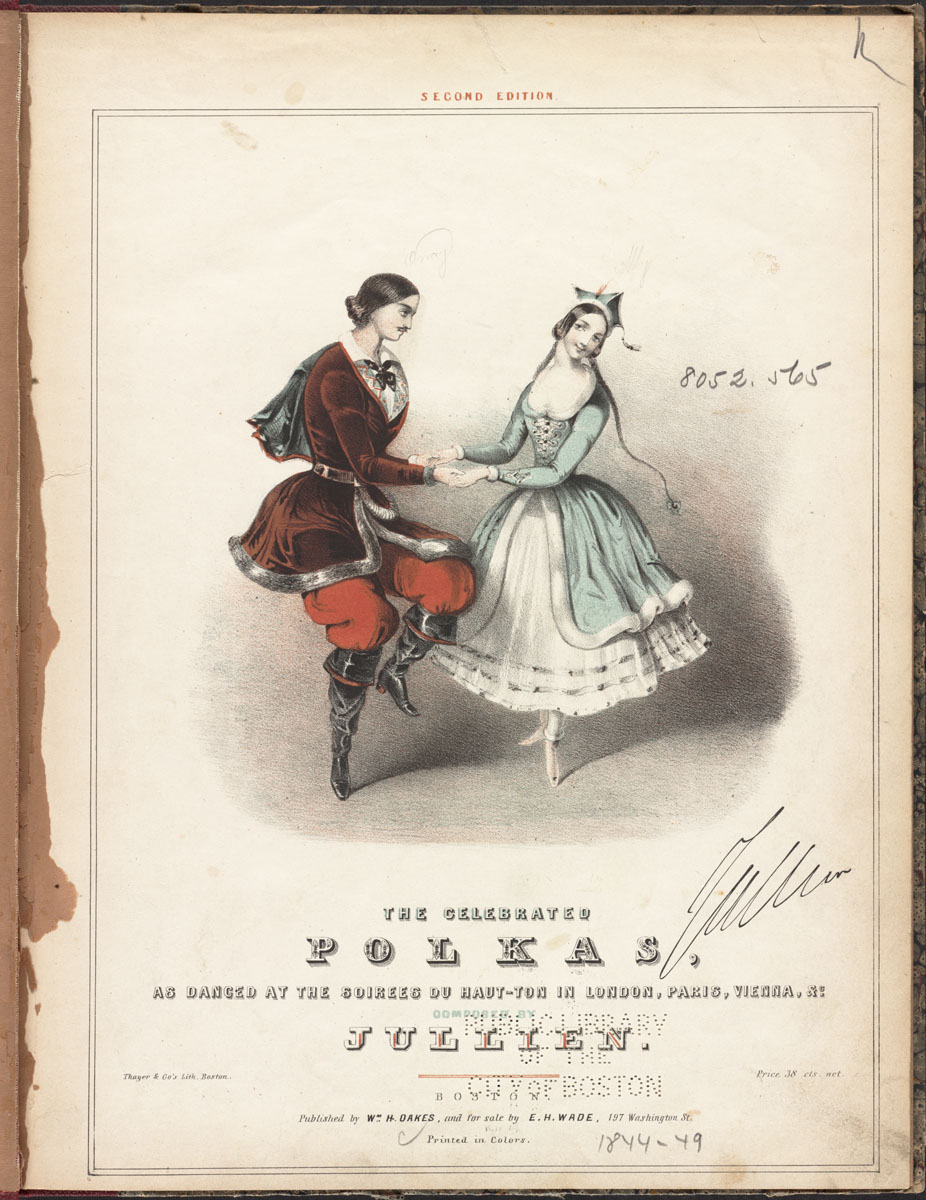
Sheet music published by W.H. Oakes

W. H. Oakes (died 1890) was a music publisher in 19th-century Boston, Massachusetts. He published compositions by Daniel Auber, Henry Russell and others.

== History ==
Although details of his life remain scarce, ample evidence exists to show that William Oakes engraved and published many works of music throughout the 1840s. He usually employed outside printers, and distributed his publications through other vendors. Oakes seems to have borne responsibility for selecting the musical work, securing copyright permissions, hiring artists to create cover images, and arranging other logistics. Oakes himself engraved the musical notations.

In 1840 Oakes and Samuel Swan formed a publishing company, Oakes & Swan. The short-lived firm published musical works such as The Lament of the Irish Emigrant by William R. Dempster, and The Land of the Blest by J.P. Knight. Swan left the partnership by January, 1841.

For several years Oakes maintained an office on Tremont Street. Oakes served in 1841 as a trustee of the Music Institute. In 1844, the Massachusetts Charitable Mechanic Association selected three examples of Oakes' music engravings to exhibit at Quincy Hall.

== Selected publications ==
- L. Schumann, composer. The Flora Waltzes. 1843.
- James G. Maeder, composer. Teddy O'Neale. 1843.
- Francis H. Brown, composer. Soldier's Dream Polka. 1849.
- Francis H. Brown, composer. Song My Mother Sings. 1849.

== Images ==
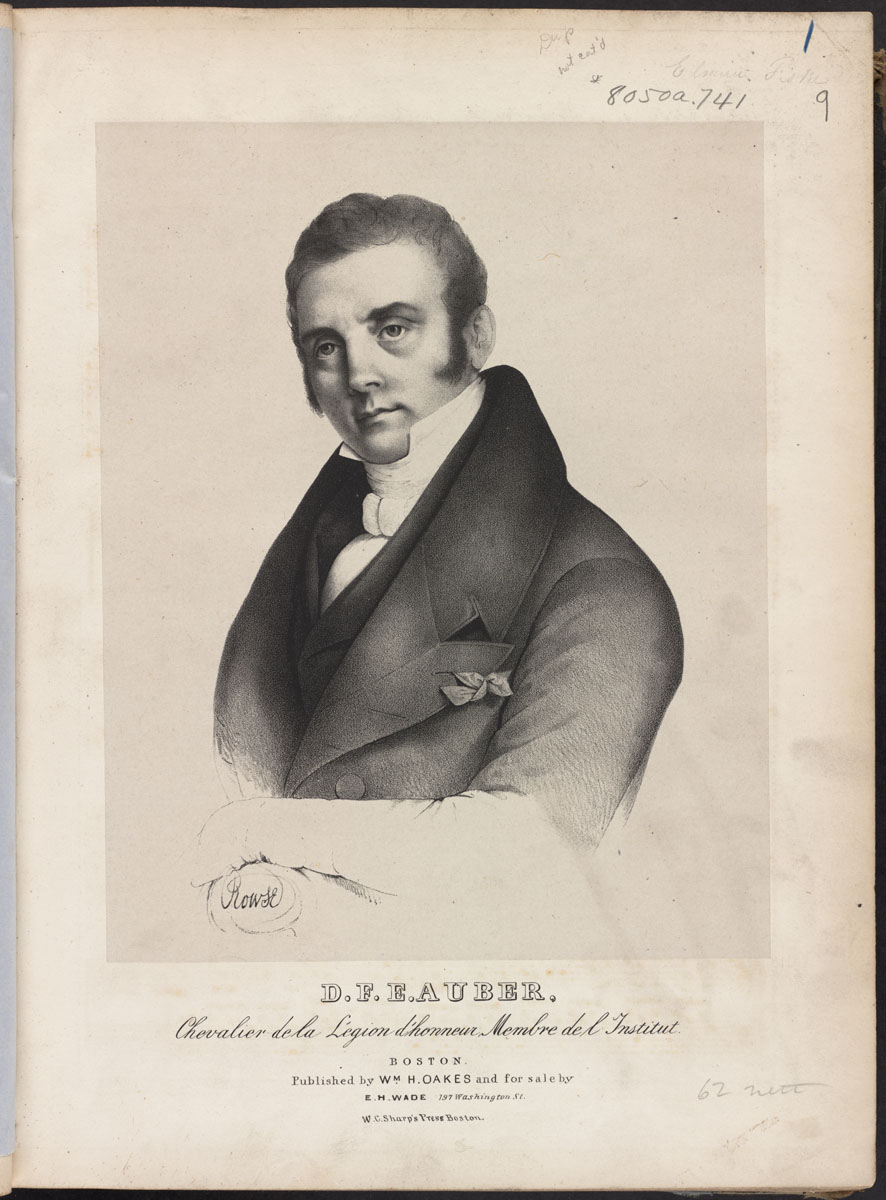
"Lestocq" by D.F.E. Auber (Boston: William H. Oakes, 19th century)

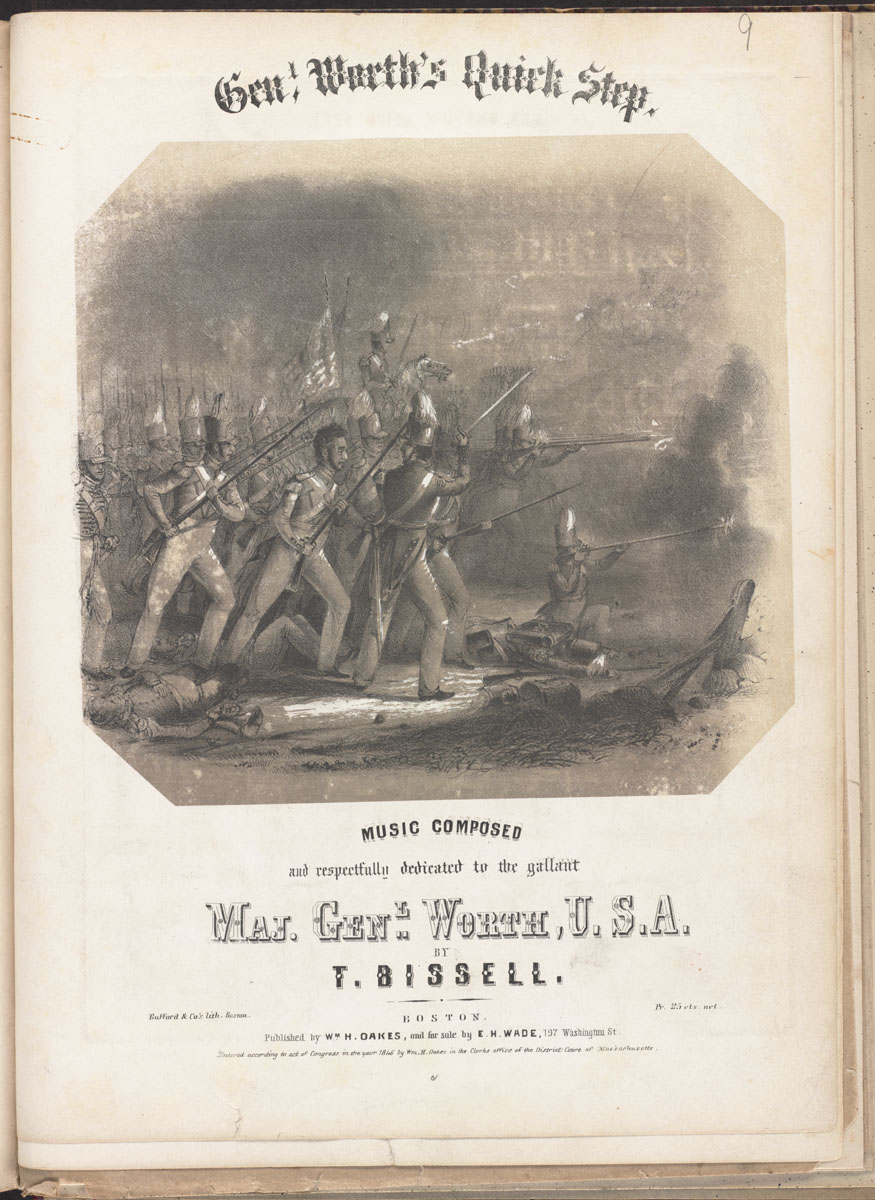
Major General Worth's Quick-Step, 1846

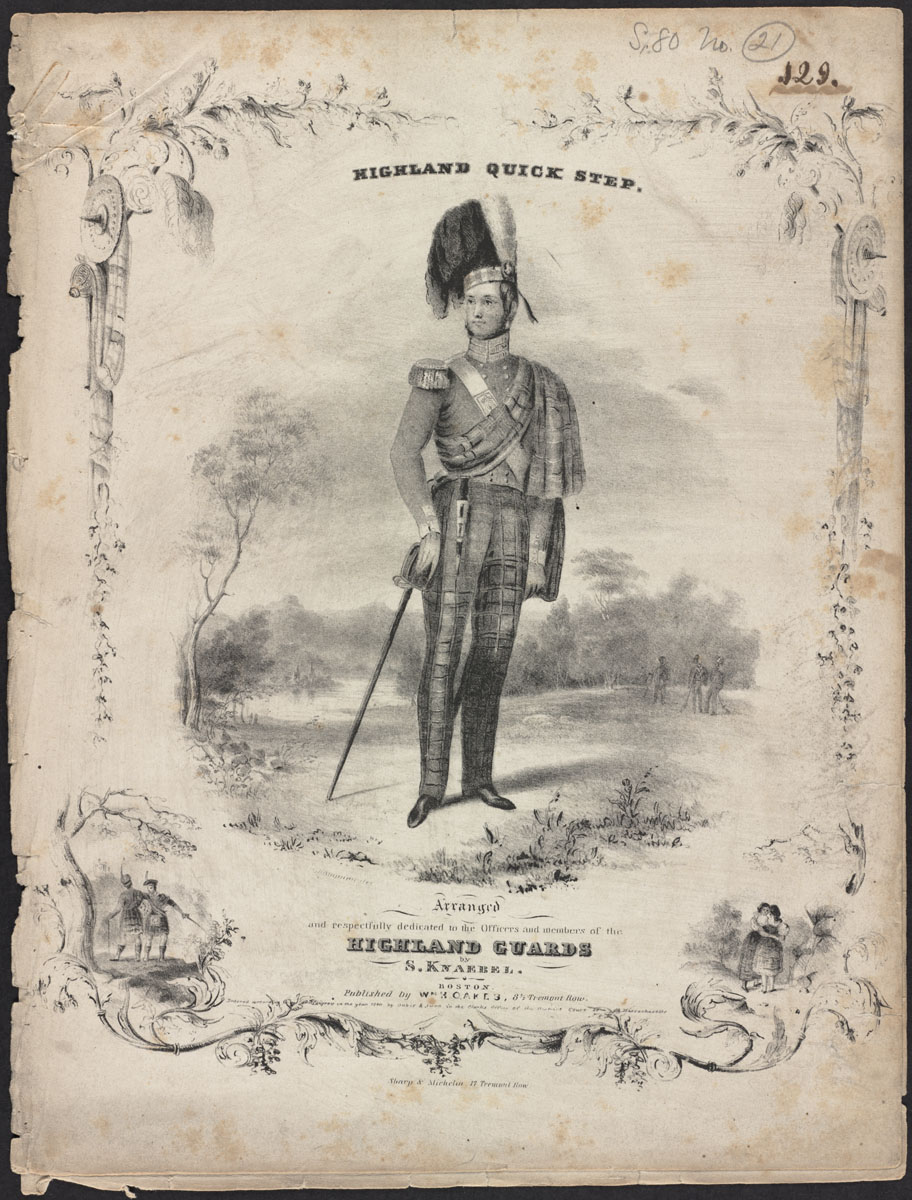
Highland Quick-Step

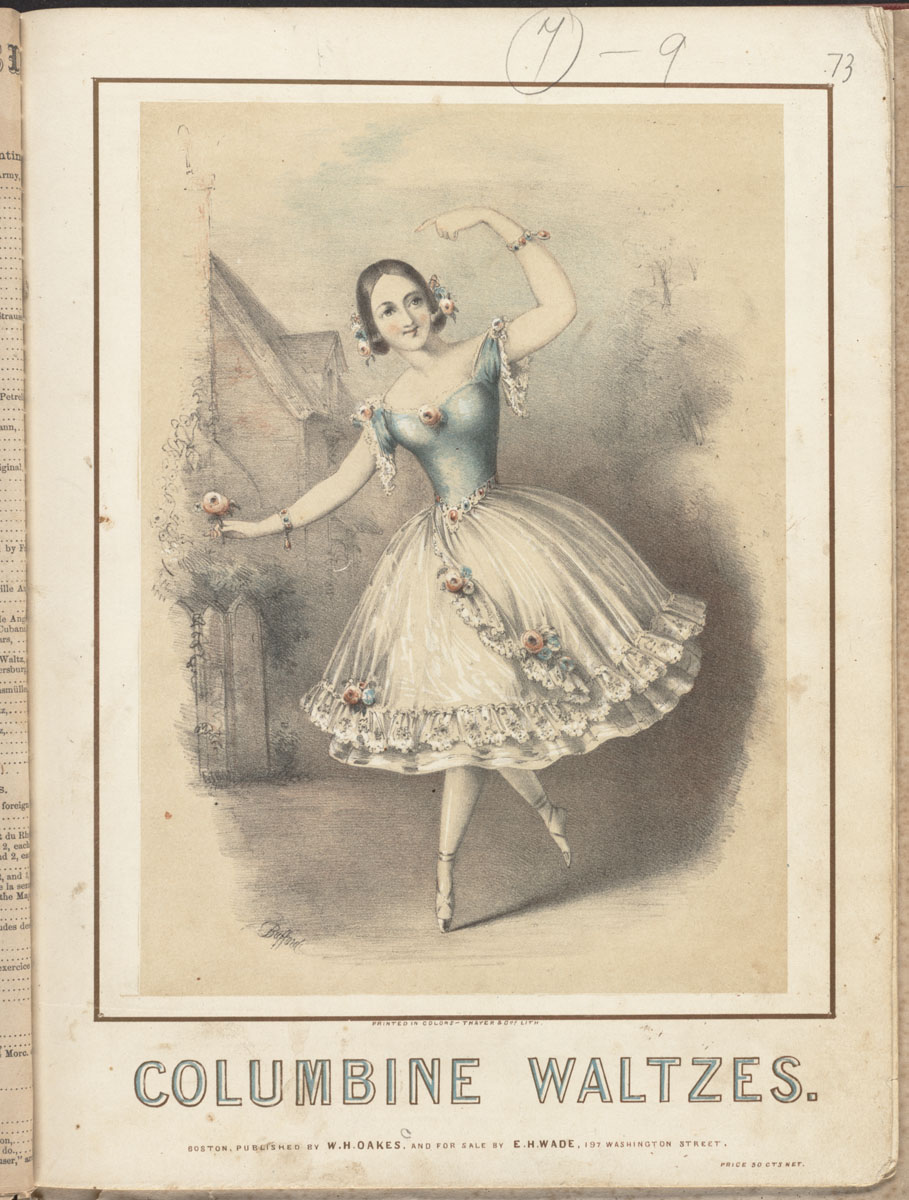
Columbine Waltzes
