= Amory Hall (Boston) =

Coordinates: 42.3546°N 71.0617°W

Amory Hall (c. 1834 – c. 1888) was located on the corner of Washington Street and West Street in Boston, Massachusetts, in the 19th century. Myriad activities took place in the rental hall, including sermons; lectures by Henry David Thoreau, Ralph Waldo Emerson, William Lloyd Garrison; political meetings; exhibitions by Rembrandt Peale, George Catlin, John Banvard; moving panoramas; magic shows; concerts; and curiosities such as the "Nova Scotia Giant Boy."

Through the years, tenants included: First Free Congregational Church (c. 1836); Grace Church (1836); artists Eastman Johnson, J.C. King, N. Southworth, T.T. Spear, William S. Tiffany (c.1847); Oliver Stearns, retailer of artists' supplies (1849–1850); artists J.A. Codman, A. Ransom, and R.M. Staigg (c.1852).

In 1888, the hall was acquired by retailer William H. Zinn and incorporated into his "Connected Stores" occupying the block bounded by West and Washington Streets and Temple Place.

== Events at Amory Hall ==
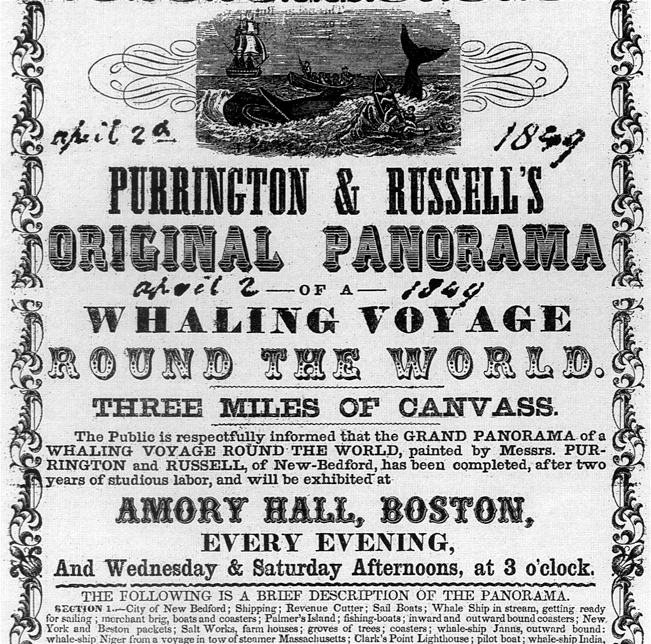
An advertisement for a showing of "The Grand Panorama of a Whaling Voyage 'Round the World" in 1849.

- 1834, November - Boston Mercantile Association Lectures
- 1836 - Herr Schmidt "electrical, mechanical and physical experiments"
- 1837, March - Dr. Graham delivered lectures "on marriage and courtship to audiences of women" "Great excitement at Amory Hall in consequence of an intended lecture to ladies, exclusively, on physical education. Many women were present, but so great was the tumult made by persons adverse to Graham and his lecture, that his object was defeated."
- 1838
  - Physiological Society weekly lectures "on various subjects connected with the human constitution, health, the structure of the body, &c. ... Object, improvement in physiological knowledge."
  - Aug. - George Catlin's Indian gallery "...will endeavour to entertain and instruct the citizens of Boston and its vicinity, for a short time with an exhibition of his paintings, costumes, &c."
  - Oct. 10 - Whig Party meeting
- 1839 - Lewis, Bartholomew & Co.'s "splendid dioramas ... the grand historical moving diorama of the Battle of Bunker Hill!! and conflagration of Charlestown
- 1842
  - Oct. 9 - James Freeman Clarke sermon on "the Sunday succeeding the death of William Ellery Channing"
  - Nov. 24 - James Freeman Clarke lecture "Slavery in the United States"
- 1844
  - Feb. 4, 11 - William Lloyd Garrison lectures
  - Feb. 18 - Charles Lane lectures
  - Feb.25 - Adin Ballou lectures
  - March 3 - Ralph Waldo Emerson's lecture "New England Reformers"
  - March 10 - Henry David Thoreau lectures, "The Conservative and the Reformer"
  - March 17 - Charles Dana lecture
  - March 17 - Joseph Rhodes Buchanan lecture
  - March 24 - Ernestine Rose lecture
  - March 31 - Wendell Phillips lecture
  - March 31 - John Pierpont lecture
  - April 21 - W.L. Garrison
  - December - Eleventh Massachusetts Anti-Slavery Fair.
- 1846
  - Rembrandt Peale's Court of Death
  - Herr Alexander "experiments in natural philosophy and magic"
- 1847
  - John Banvard
  - George Brewer's panorama of the wonders and natural curiosities of the American continent. Fairmout Water works, & adjacent scenery ... Mammoth Cave of Kentucky."
  - Walter McPherson Bayne's "gigantic panoramic picture of a voyage to Europe! Comprises views of Boston, its harbor, the Atlantic, the River Mersey, Liverpool, London from the Thames, and both sides of the Rhine, painted from original sketches taken by the artist himself, constituting by far the largest panorama ever presented to the public, and which has been in preparation upwards of three years."
- 1848 - Hine's "journey from Paris to Rome! over the Alps."
- 1849
  - April - Caleb Purrington and Benjamin Russell's "Panorama of a Whaling Voyage"
  - William Burr's "seven mile mirror! the mammoth moving painting of the Great Lakes and rivers"
  - Stockwell's colossal panorama of the upper and lower Mississippi rivers
- 1850 - Brunetti's model of ancient Jerusalem, and Mr. Malone Raymond "with a descriptive lecture"
- 1851
  - January - Nova Scotia giant boy
  - April - Miss Reynaldson. "Scotch melodies by this distinguished vocalist."
- 1852
  - Exhibition of Edward A. Brackett's "marble group of the shipwrecked mother and child"
  - May - "Immense attraction at Amory Hall. This fashionable place of resort is thronged every afternoon and evening, with crowds of those who wish to see the great panorama of California. Mr. Edward Wilson, the learned author of 'Sketches in the Mines' delivers an explanatory lecture."
  - "The hall is now leased to the Handel and Haydn Society for every Sunday evening for 5 years; to the Musical Fund Society and to the Germanians for their concerts; also to the Mercantile Library Association for 30 evenings, and to the religious society of the Rev. Theodore Parker for the Sunday forenoons."
- 1853 - Antonio "Signor" Blitz "scenes in ventriloquism and great magical illusions."
- 1877 - Caroline Shawk Brooks, butter sculptor
