= George Hollingsworth =

American artist (1813–1882)

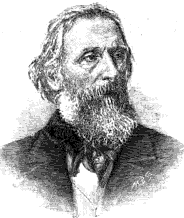
Portrait of George Hollingsworth, 19th century

George Hollingsworth (1813–1882) was an American artist, teacher, and administrator active in Massachusetts.

His father, Mark Hollingsworth, was part owner of Tileston & Hollingsworth, a paper manufacturing firm. George completed his studies in Europe. For 28 years he managed and taught at the Lowell Institute, which began admitting women students at his suggestion. He was affiliated with the Boston Artists' Association.

He lived in Milton, and kept a studio in Boston on Washington Street (c. 1848–1868). His paintings Portrait of the Hollingsworth Family (c. 1840) and The Hollingsworth Home in Milton (1840s) are in the Museum of Fine Arts, Boston.

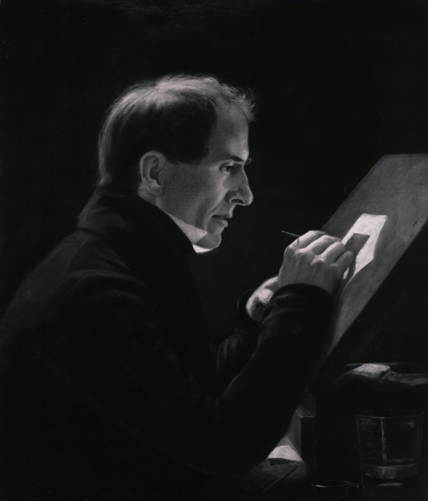
Portrait of Alvan Clark

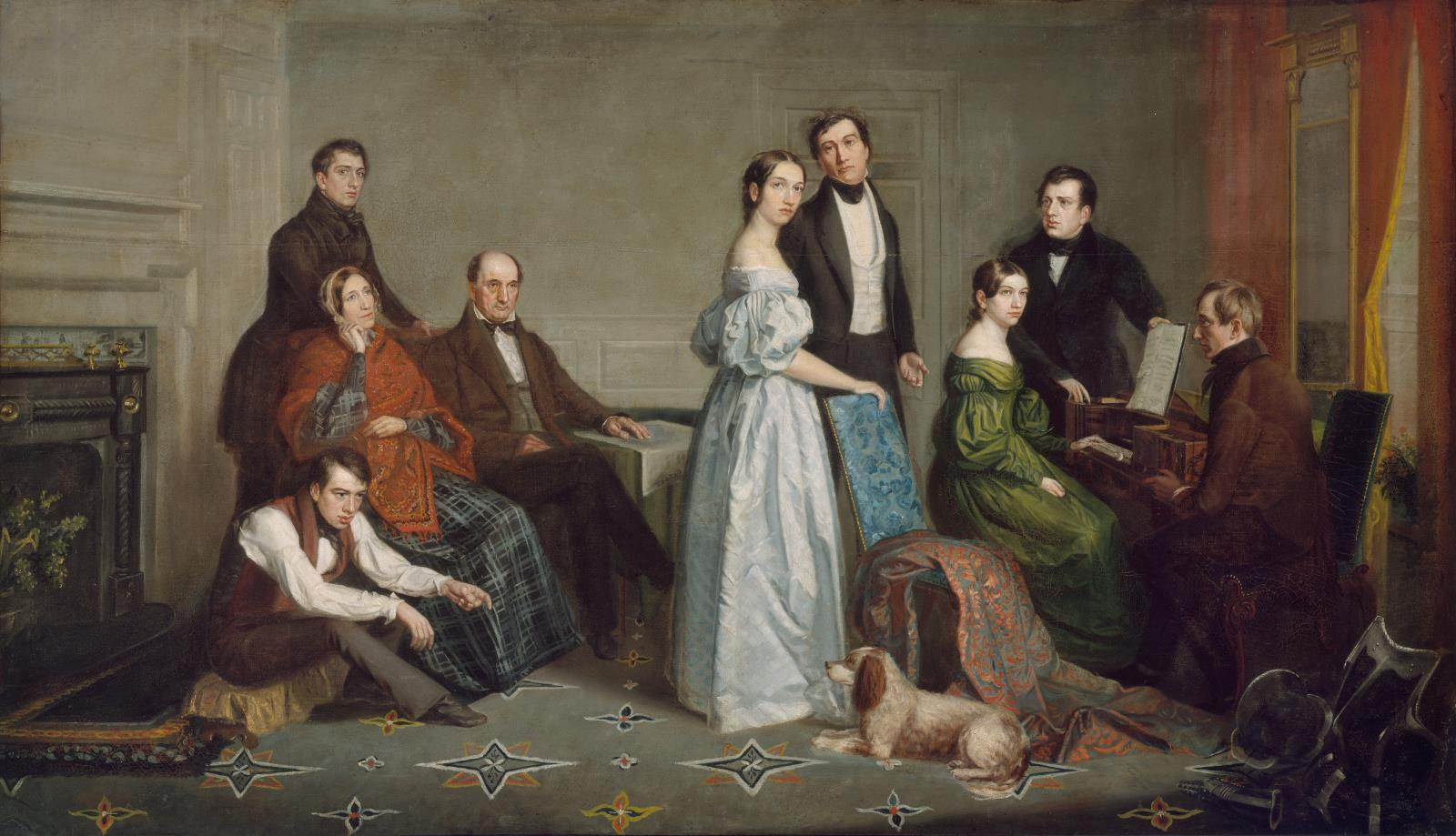
Portrait of the Hollingsworth Family, c. 1840

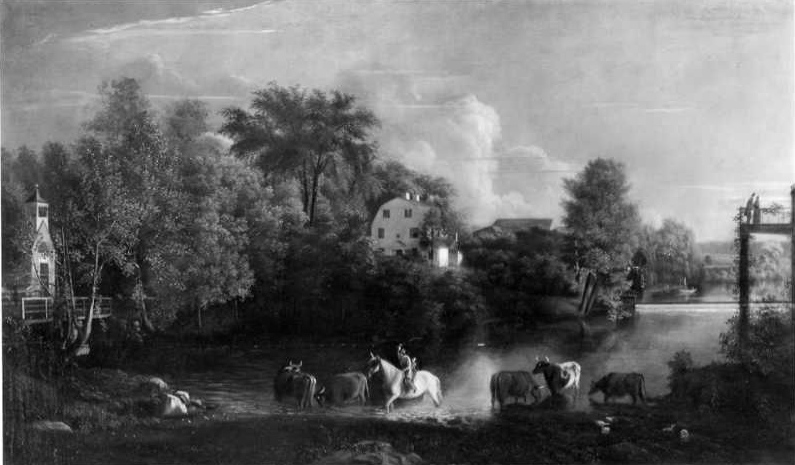
The Hollingsworth Home in Milton, 1840s
