= Charles Hubbard (artist) =

American painter (1801–1875)

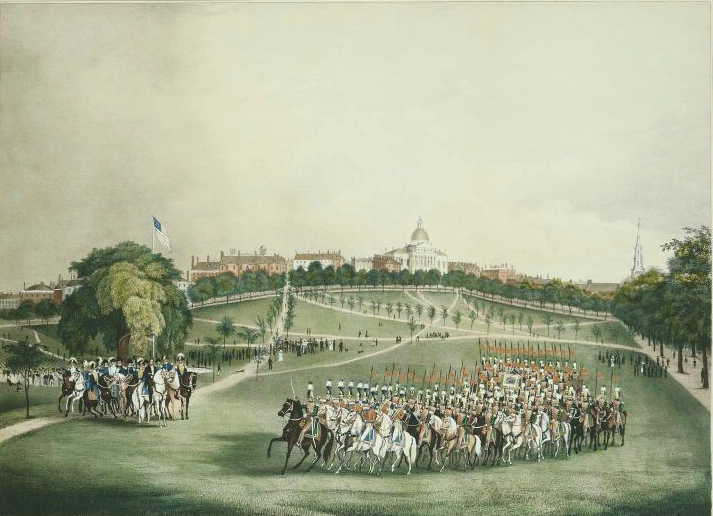
"National Lancers with the Reviewing Officers on the Boston Common," by Hubbard, 1837 (Museum of Fine Arts, Boston)

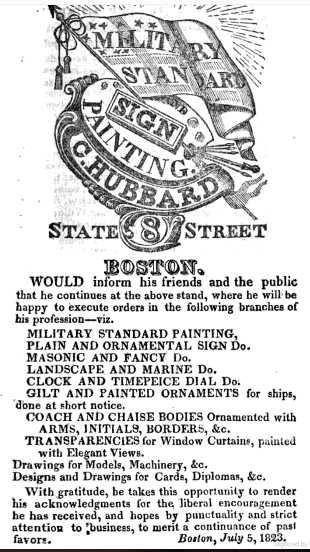
Advertisement for Charles Hubbard, painter, Boston, 1823

Charles Hubbard (1801–1875) was an artist in Boston, Massachusetts in the 19th century. He kept a studio on Tremont Row and was affiliated with the Boston Artists' Association. He served as state senator from 1851-1852.

== Biography ==
Hubbard trained with J.R. Penniman. From 1822 to 1823 Hubbard formed a business partnership with ornamental and sign painters Samuel Curtis and B.B. Curtis as "Curtis's & Hubbard" (also known as "Curtises & Hubbard"). They produced a variety of painting, "in a plain and neat, or rich and ornamental style as may be requested," including "military standard, plain and ornamental sign, fancy, masonic, landscape, glass, clock and timepiece dial; designs and drawings for cards, diplomas, &c; transparencies ... for window curtains." Clients included the Ancient and Honorable Artillery Company of Massachusetts; the Chester Light Infantry of Chester, New Hampshire; and the Haverhill Light Infantry Company of Haverhill, Massachusetts.

He joined the Ancient and Honorable Artillery Company of Massachusetts in 1822. "He was an ensign of a company in the 2nd Regiment, 3rd Brigade, 1st Division, M.V.M., from 1822-1825, lieutenant of the same from 1826-1828, and subsequently was promoted to be captain."

In 1823 he contributed to the July 4th festivities in Hingham, Massachusetts. "The dawn of this interesting day was, as usual, ushered in by the ringing of bells. ... At an early hour a numerous collection of beauty and fashion, alive to the feelings of which the occasion inspired, assembled to witness the presentation to the Hingham Rifle Company, of an elegant stand of colours, painted by Mr. Charles Hubbard, of Boston, in a style which does great credit to the talents of the artist."

Hubbard married Amelia Jane Ripley at Boston, Massachusetts on 19 January 1826 by Rev. James D. Knowles. Amelia Jane Ripley d/o John & Jane Molyneaux Ripley was b. 29 July 1806 Boston, Massachusetts Baptized Baptist Church of Boston by Rev. Stow in 1833; they had several children, including: Jane Ripley Hubbard b. 1827, Ellen Maria Hubbard, Abigail James Hubbard b. 1831, Charles Hubbard Jr. (b. 1835). Elizabeth Capen Hubbard b. 1838 and Florence Amelia Hubbard b. 1841.

He exhibited work at Harding's Gallery in 1834; and in the first exhibition of the Massachusetts Charitable Mechanic Association in 1837, and again 1844. By 1852 he was "an artist of some celebrity."

Hubbard moved his residence "to Chelsea in 1835, serving the city as selectman and chairman of the school committee. In 1851 and again in 1852 he represented his district (of Suffolk) in the senate of the General Court of the Commonwealth of Massachusetts."
