= Mercantile Library Association (Boston) =

The Mercantile Library Association (1820-1952) of Boston was an organization dedicated to operating a subscription library, reading room and lecture series. Members included James T. Fields and Edwin Percy Whipple. Although the association had a relatively long history, its heyday occurred in the mid-19th century, particularly the 1840s and 1850s.

== History ==
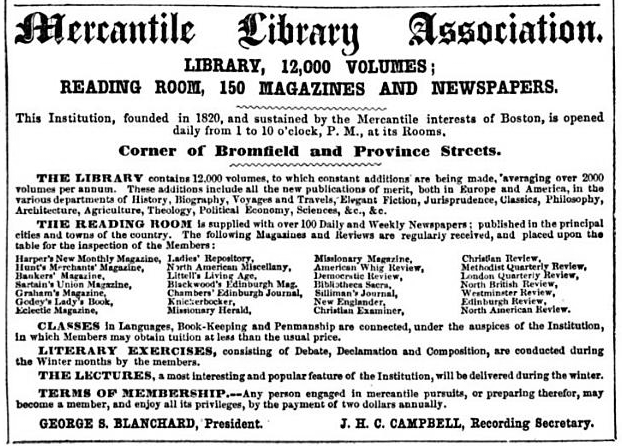
1852 directory listing, Bromfield St. and Province St., Boston

The association was organized in 1820, "to establish a library and reading room for the use of young men engaged in mercantile pursuits ...the first association of the kind in the United States." Founders included Theodore Lyman, J.G. Gibson, Samuel A. Otis, N.A. Barrett, Thomas Gorham, James T. Blanchard, Lynde M. Walter, Charles J. Johnson, Edward Codman, Henry A. David and Samuel W. Pomeroy. Initially the library operated from rooms in Merchants' Hall, Congress Street, and later moved to Harding's buildings on School Street (1836-1841), then to Amory Hall on Washington Street.

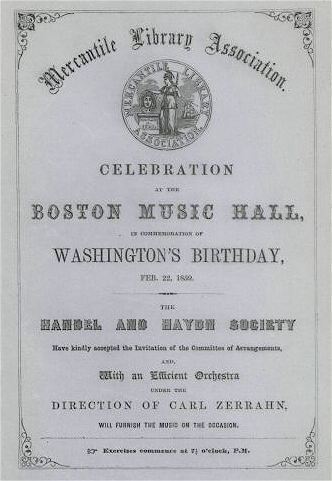
1859 Washington's Birthday celebration at the Boston Music Hall

The association underwent highs and lows through the years. After a decade of minimal growth, the association engaged in a successful fundraising effort in 1835, expanding its revenue and membership. Major benefactors included Abbott Lawrence. In 1836 "a severe calamity was experienced in the destruction, by fire, of the cabinet of curiosities, and several valuable paintings. Many of the books were also very much injured by water." Thereafter membership and activities were re-energized. In 1842 "the Boston Marine Society deposited with the Association their extensive cabinet of curiosities, containing about two thousand rare and valuable specimens."" The association was officially incorporated in 1845.

In 1840 Edward Everett spoke to the association on "Accumulation, Property, Capital, Credit." In 1844 Ralph Waldo Emerson gave a lecture entitled "The Young American." In 1847 Charles Sumner spoke on "White Slavery in the Barbary States." In 1849, Horace Mann addressed the association’s 29th Anniversary with a, “A Few Thoughts for a Young Man.” Other speakers included Oliver Wendell Holmes Sr.; poet Park Benjamin Sr.; George S. Boutwell; Thomas Greaves Cary; Rufus Choate; Caleb Cushing; George Stillman Hillard; William F. Sturgis; and Robert Charles Winthrop.

By 1849, some 1,145 members belonged to the library. Library collections included 5,819 volumes. Around 1851, the library occupied quarters on Province Street, at the corner of Bromfield Street. By 1861 until at least 1868, the library had moved to Summer Street.

In 1877 the association gave its collection of 18,000 books to the South End branch of the Boston Public Library, located in the basement of the association's building on Tremont Street and Newton Street. According to one historian, after 1881 "the Association, deprived of its library, entered upon a steadily less successful career as a social club that came to a dusty and inglorious end in 1952."

== Lecturers and performers ==
1830s

- Edward Everett
- James T. Fields

1840s

- Park Benjamin Sr.
- George W. Bethune
- Elihu Burritt
- Thomas Greaves Cary
- Ralph Waldo Emerson
- Edward Everett
- Ezra S. Gannett
- Mrs. Frances Anne Kemble
- T.S. King
- George Lunt
- E.L. Magoun
- Horace Mann
- Wendell Phillips
- Geo. Putnam
- William F. Sturgis
- Charles Sumner
- George Vandenhoff
- Edwin P. Whipple
- Richard S. Willis
- Leonard Woods Jr.

1850s

- Henry Ward Beecher
- Henry W. Bellows
- Thomas H. Benton
- Frank P. Blair Jr.
- Rufus Choate
- Thomas M. Clark
- Orville Dewey
- David Dudley Field
- George Stillman Hillard;
- Oliver Wendell Holmes Sr.
- G.P.R. James
- Thomas S. King
- George P. Marsh
- Samuel Osgood
- Francis T. Russell
- Andrew L. Stone
- James S. Thayer
- Edwin P. Whipple

1860s

- N.P. Banks
- George S. Boutwell
- Peleg W. Chandler
- Henry F. Durant
- Edward Everett
- J. Hanley Grimes
- George H. Hepworth
- Miss Angela Starr King
- Benjamin F. Thomas

== See also ==
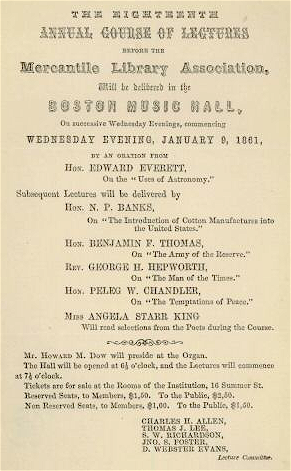
1861 lecture series

- Mercantile Library (disambiguation)
- Center for Fiction (New York Mercantile Library)
