= Harding's Gallery (Boston) =

Harding's Gallery (c. 1833–1847) in Boston, Massachusetts, exhibited works by European and American artists in the 1830s-1840s. The building on School Street also housed a newspaper press; the Mercantile Library Association; the Boston Artists' Association; and artists' studios. The building's name derived from painter Chester Harding, who kept his studio there.

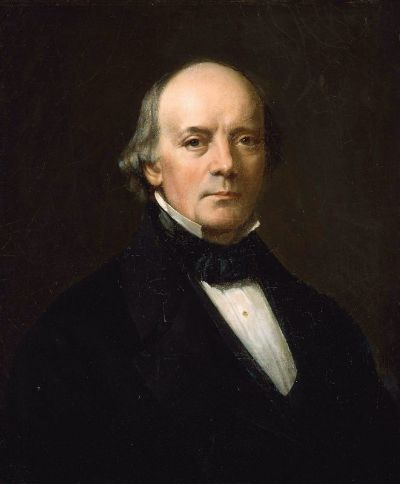
Self-portrait by Chester Harding, c. 1843 (courtesy Museum of Fine Arts, Boston)

== History ==
=== Jefferson auction ===
In July 1833, an auction occurred at the gallery of some of the paintings bought by Thomas Jefferson in Paris, and subsequently hung about his house at Monticello. Original works for sale included a portrait of George Washington by Joseph Wright/John Trumbull (1784); a portrait of John Adams by Mather Brown (1788); and a portrait of Lafayette by Joseph Boze (1790). The auction also offered copies of works by Domenichino; Holbein; Godfrey Kneller (portrait of John Locke); Leonardo; Le Sueur; Raphael; Ribera; Rubens; Van Dyck; and others. Some of the copies depicted originals in the Palazzo Pitti and elsewhere.

Jefferson's paintings of Natural Bridge and The Potomac Coming Through the Blue Ridge by William Roberts were sold at the Harding auction. The original purchase of these two paintings is recorded in Jefferson's ledger. A copy of the auction catalog for Jefferson's first auction in 1828 is held by the New York Public Library. A copy of the catalog for the Harding auction in 1833 is held by the Alderman Library at the University of Virginia.

Buyers at the Harding auction included James W. Sever; Israel Thorndike, Jr.; and Mrs. John W. Davis.

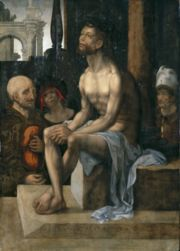
Jesus in the Praetorium. Copy after 1527 original by Jan Gossaert.

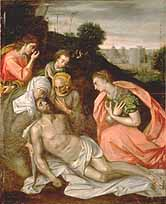
Descent from the Cross, 16th century, by Frans Floris.

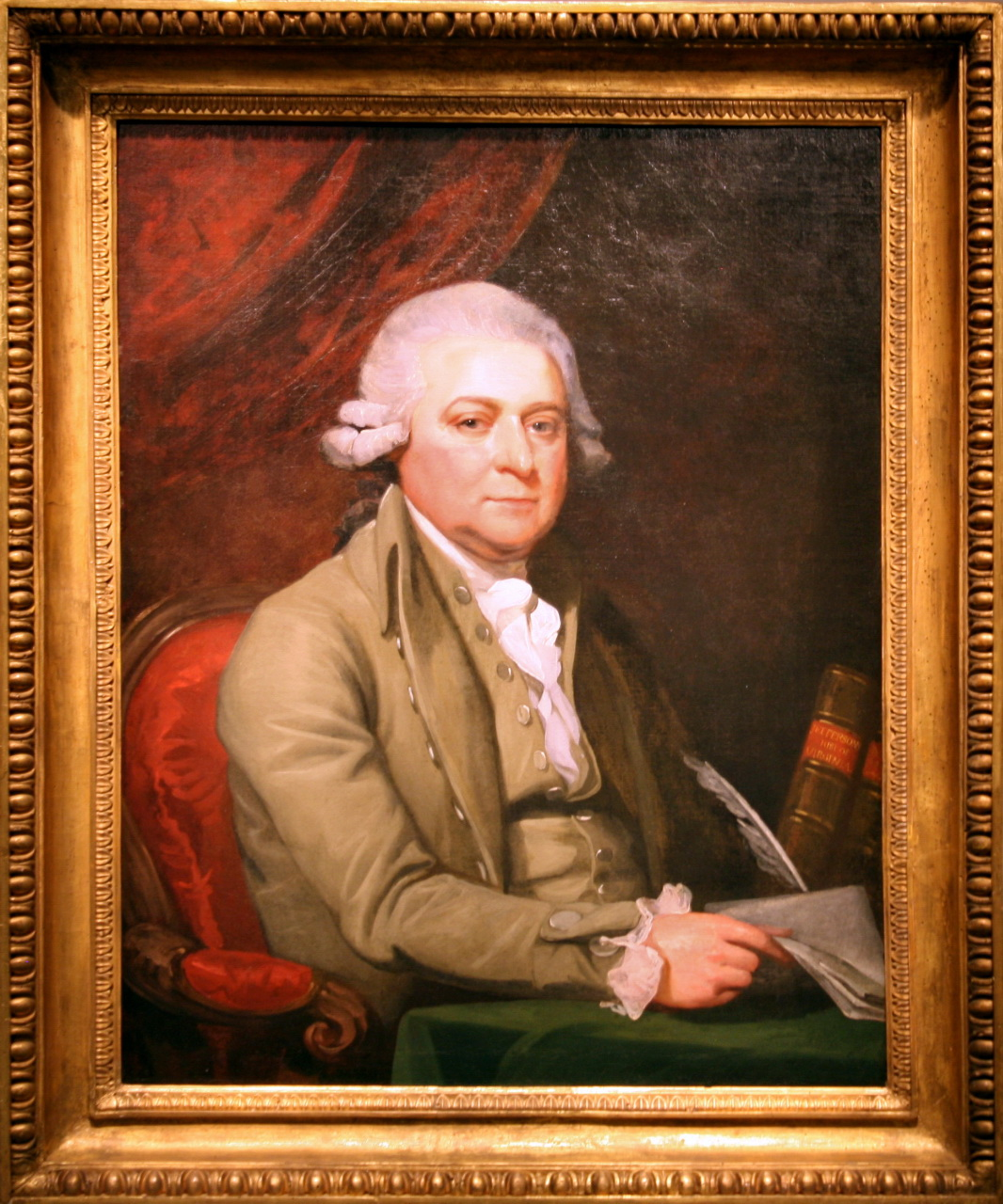
John Adams, c. 1788, by Mather Brown.

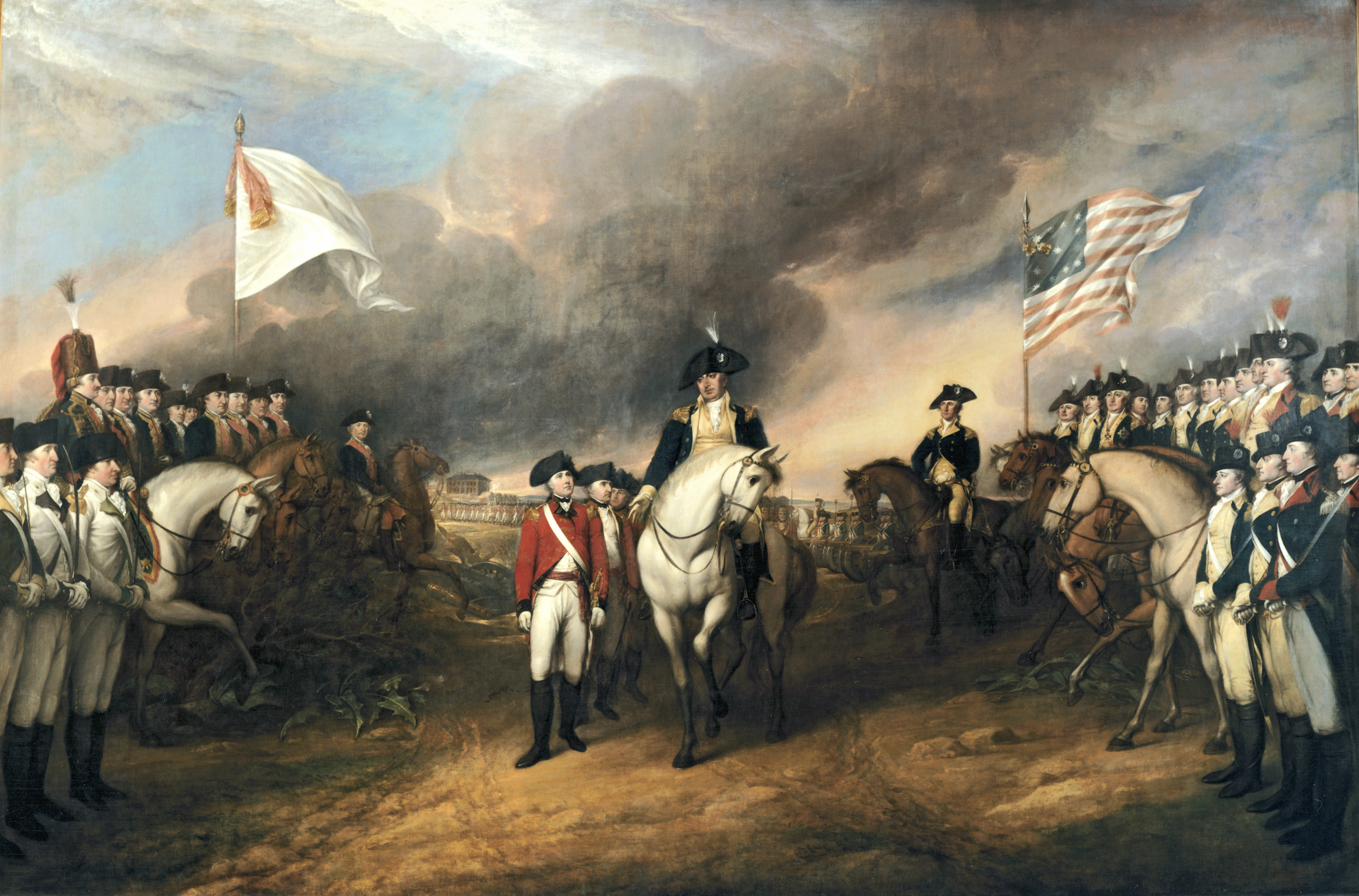
Surrender of Cornwallis at Yorktown, 1817, by John Trumbull.

=== Exhibitions ===
==== Washington Allston ====
"In 1839 there was an exhibition ... of such works of Washington Allston as could be borrowed for the occasion. This was managed by the friends of the artist for his benefit. The exhibition was held in Harding's Gallery, a square, well-lighted room, but too small for the larger pictures. It was, however, the best room that could be procured for the purpose. Here was shown forty-five pictures, including one or two drawings. ... On entering, the presence of the artist seemed to fill the room. The door-keeper held the door, but Allston held the room." Works included: "Dead man restored to life" (1813); "The Valentine;" "Isaac of York;" "Portrait of Benjamin West, late president of the Royal Academy, London;" "Portrait of Samuel Williams;" "Rosalie;" "Jessica and Lorenzo;" "Portrait of the late Mrs. Wm. Channing;" and others. Lenders to the exhibit included David Sears; James F. Baldwin; George Ticknor; Warren Dutton; Nathan Appleton; Thomas Handasyd Perkins; Thomas H. Perkins Jr.; William H. Sumner; and others.

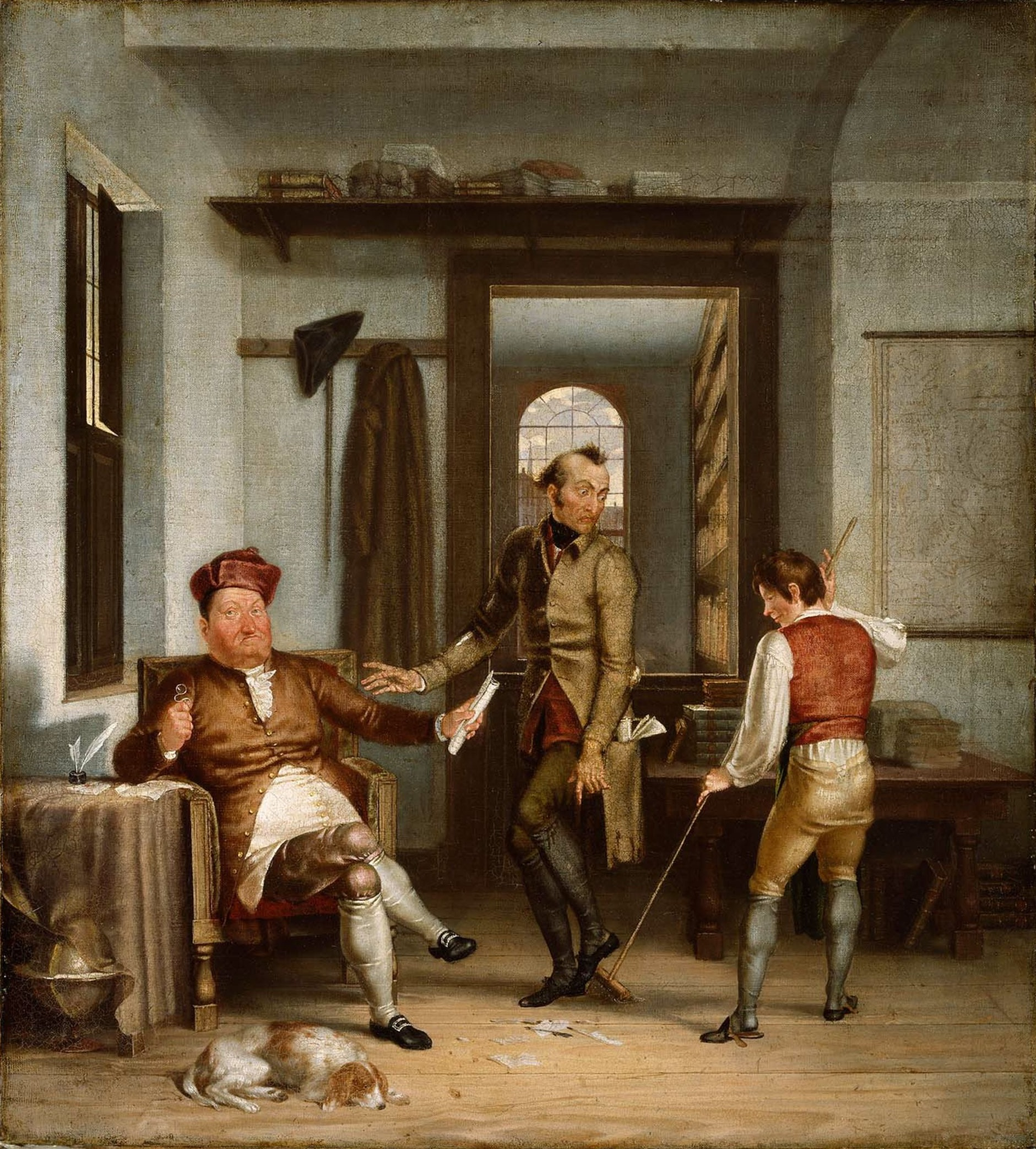
The Poor Author and the Rich Bookseller, by Allston, 1811

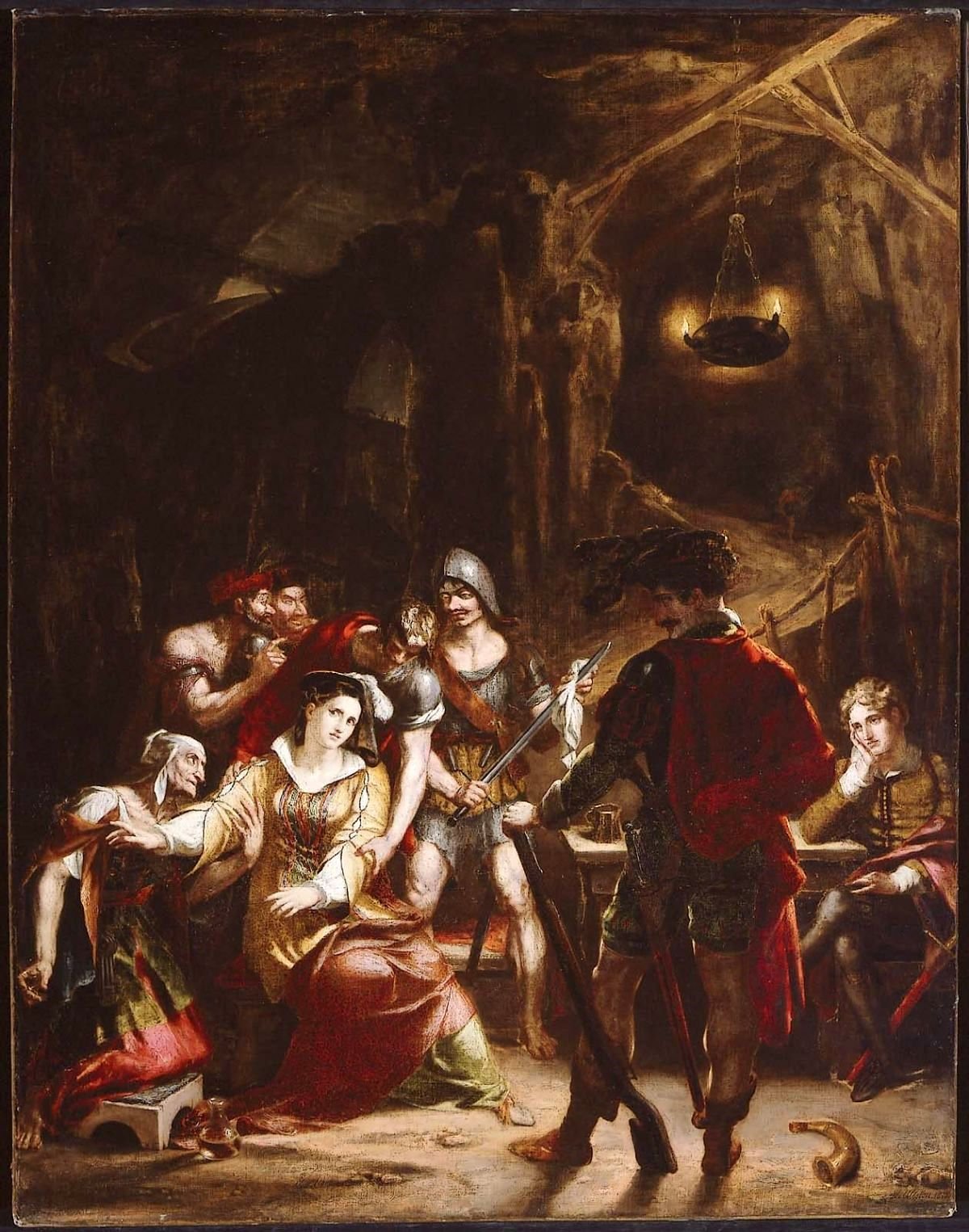
Donna Mencia in the Robber's Cavern, by Allston, 1815

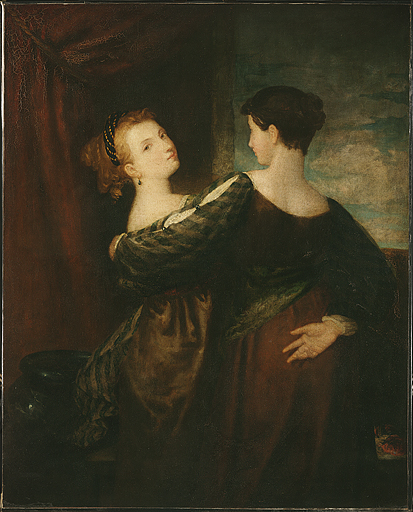
The Sisters, by Allston, c. 1817

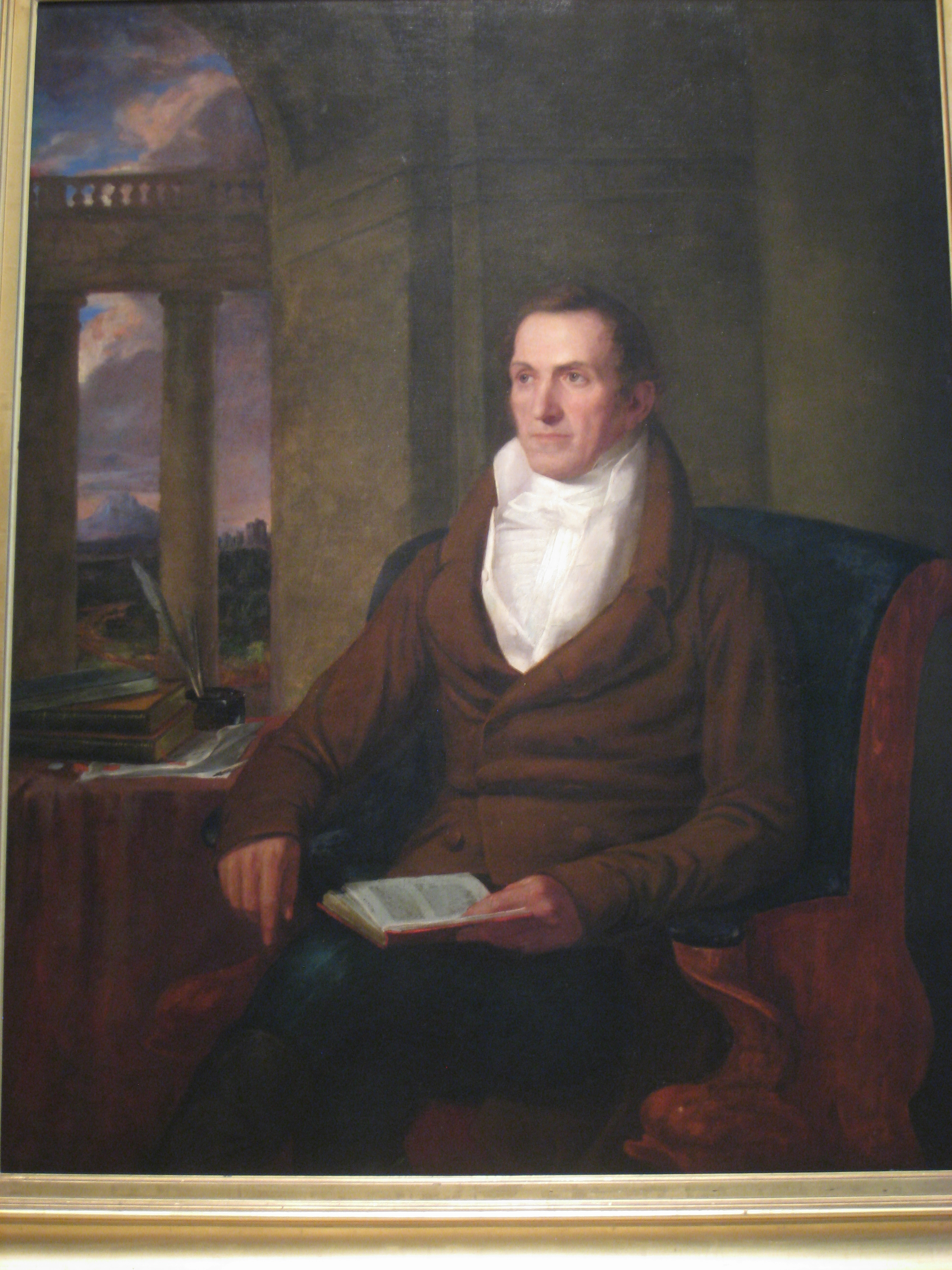
Portrait of Samuel Williams, by Allston, c. 1817

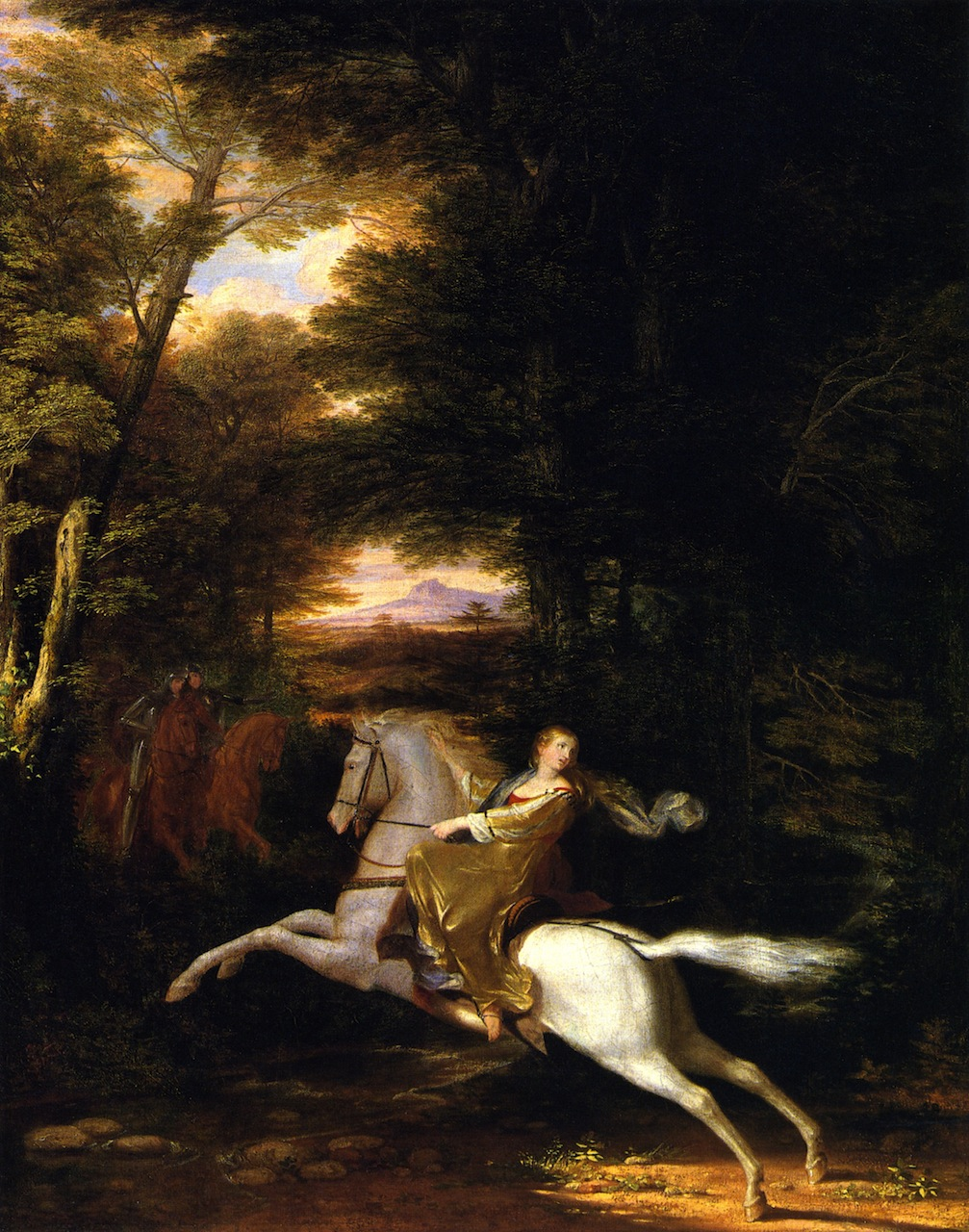
The Flight of Florimell, by Allston, 1819

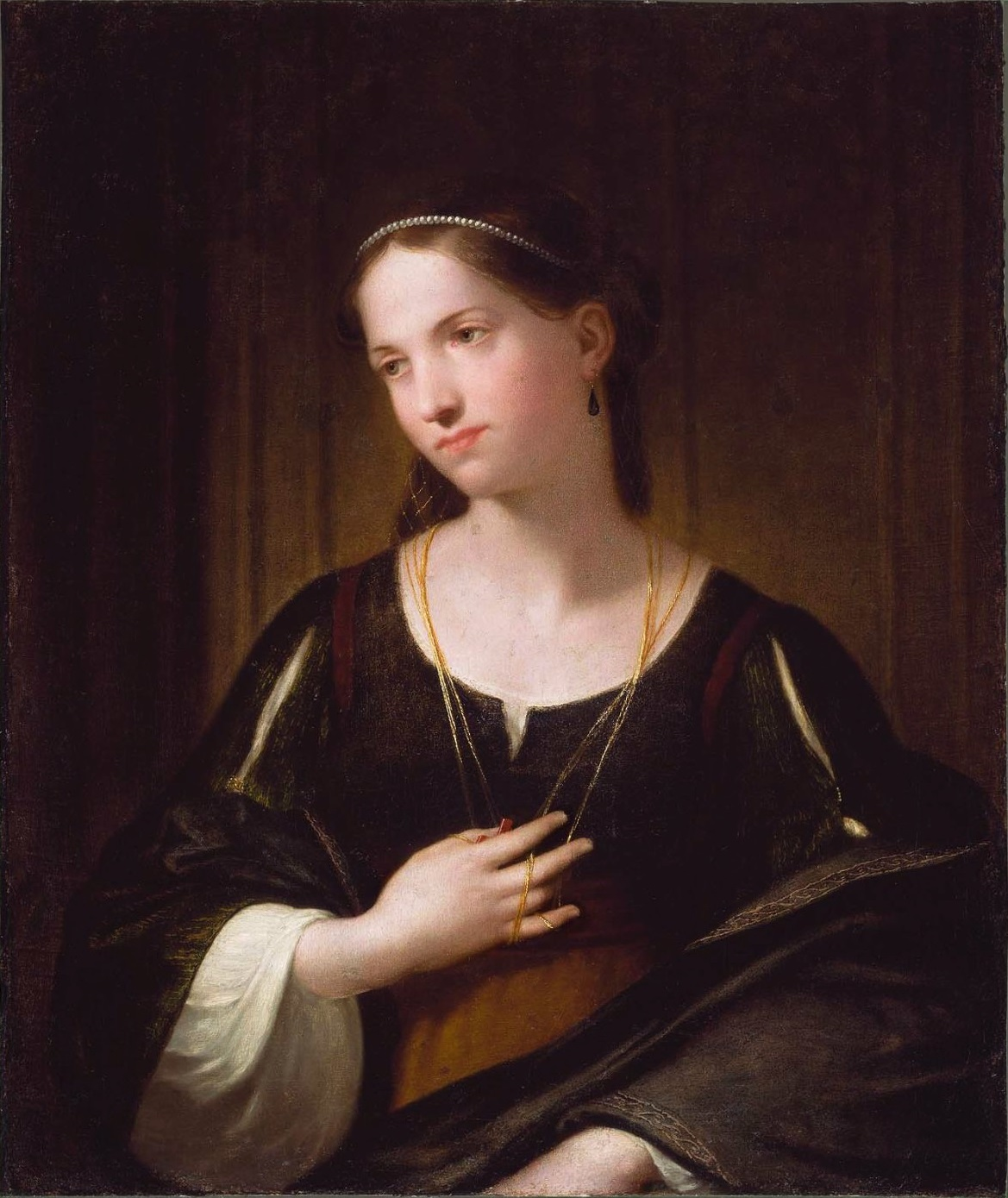
Beatrice, by Allston, 1819

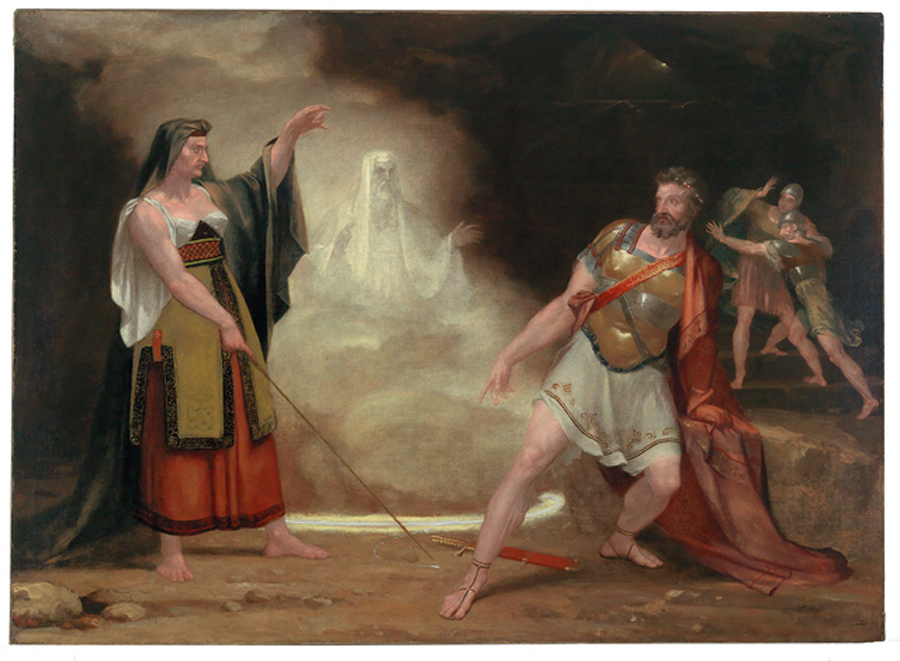
Saul and the Witch of Endor, by Allston, 1820

==== Boston Artists Association ====
The first public exhibit of the newly formed Boston Artists' Association in 1842 at Harding's Gallery featured works by mostly local artists, as well as a few by (or after) European masters (e.g. Tintoretto, Rembrandt). Visitors to the gallery could see recent pieces by Fitz Henry Lane and Gilbert Stuart. T.H. Perkins and others lent works to the exhibition. The second and third exhibits of the association took place 1843–1844. Margaret Fuller, on visiting Harding's on July 6, 1844, wrote in her diary: "I went to town. Artists' Gallery, sad sad sight."

== Events ==
- 1833, July 19 – Auction of paintings from the collection of Thomas Jefferson.
- 1834, May – Artist's exhibit. Included works by Francis Alexander; Thomas Doughty; Alvan Fisher; Chester Harding, Charles Hubbard.
- 1834 – Marble statuary exhibit. Included works by (or after) Baelandi; Barratta; Bartolini; Bellucci; Benassae; Bombardi; Canova; Cardelli; Fidia; Orzalezi; Pampaloni; Tenerani; Thorwaldsen; Vanelli.
- 1839 – Washington Allston exhibit.
- 1841 – Armour and arms exhibit, from the Royal Armoury of Segovia; along with paintings. Included works by (or after) Francisco Zurbarán; Clarkson Frederick Stanfield; Edwin Henry Landseer; Henritz Koekoeck; Robert Bridgehouse; Luca Giordano; Cornelis de Heem; J.C. Clayton; Caspar Netscher.
- 1841 – Modern European painting exhibit.
- 1842 – 1st Boston Artists' Association exhibit. Included: Henry Sargent; Fitz Henry Lane; Tintoretto; Anthony van Dyck; and others.
- 1843 – 2nd Boston Artists' Association exhibit. Included: Thomas Cole; Philip Harry; Asher Brown Durand; Thomas Sully; and others.
- 1844 – 3rd Boston Artists' Association exhibit
- 1846 – Master paintings exhibit, from Italy; charity benefit. Included works for sale by (or copies after): Paul Bril; Giuseppe Cesari; Domenico Fiasella; Abraham Janssens; Salvator Rosa; Carlo Antonio Tavella; Paolo Veronese; Giovanni Battista Zelotti.

== Image gallery ==
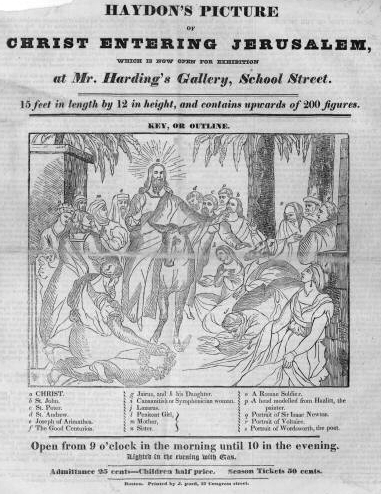
Advertisement for Benjamin Haydon's "picture of Christ entering Jerusalem, which is now open for exhibition at Mr. Harding's gallery, School Street," c. 1833

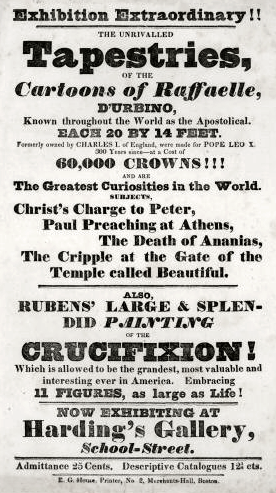
"Exhibition extraordinary!! The unrivalled tapestries of the cartoons of Raffaelle ... Also, Rubens' large & splendid painting of the crucifixion! ... Now exhibiting at Harding's Gallery, School St., Boston," c. 1830s

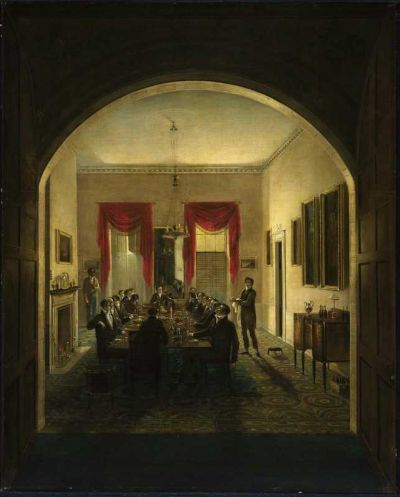
The Dinner Party, c. 1821, by Henry Sargent, displayed in the 1st Boston Artists' Association exhibit, 1842

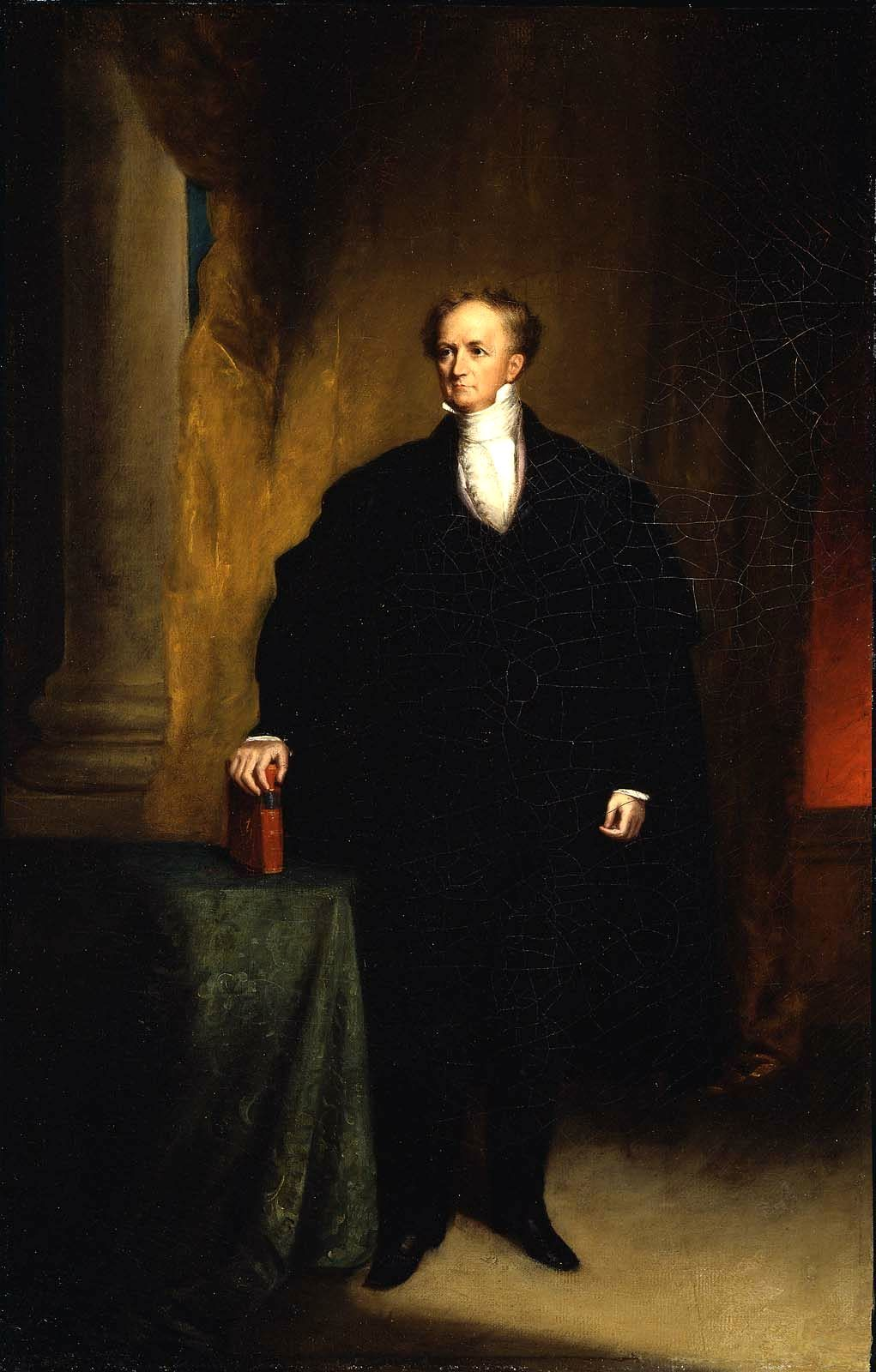
Abbott Lawrence, c. 1842, by Chester Harding, displayed in the 1st Boston Artists' Association exhibit, 1842

== See also ==
- Boston Artists' Association, in Harding's Gallery c. 1841–1846
- Chester Harding
- Mercantile Library Association (Boston, Massachusetts), in Harding's buildings 1836–1841
