= Benjamin Russell (artist) =

American painter

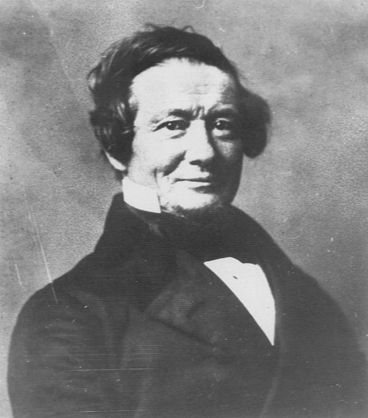
Benjamin Russell, ca.1850

Benjamin Russell (October 16, 1804 – March 3, 1885) was an American artist best known for his accurate watercolors of whaling ships working in New England. Born to a wealthy family in New Bedford, Massachusetts, Russell started drawing and painting in his late 30s, after a few years spent working as a cooper aboard a whaling ship.

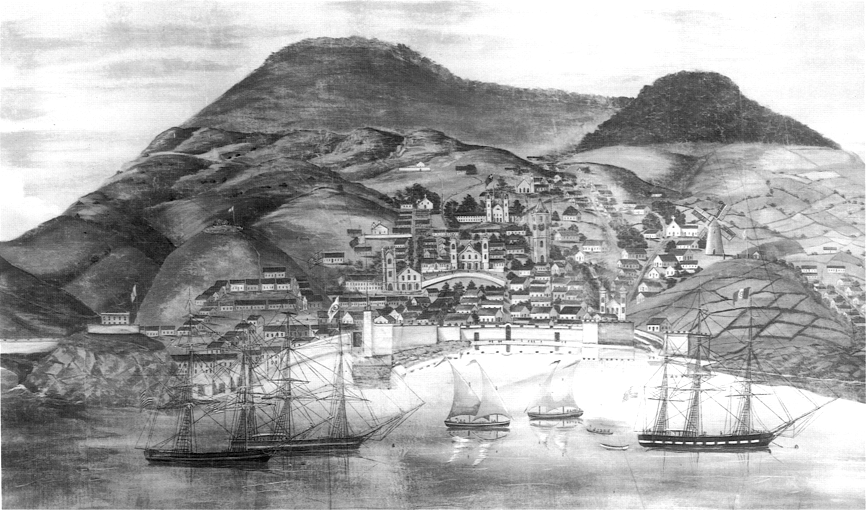
Detail from Whaling Voyage Round the World by Russell & Purrington, ca.1848

Russell's depiction of perspective and depth are stiff and flat, and his images "were appreciated more for their accurate representation than their artistic value." However, most of his work is perfectly to scale, resembling control drawings, and Russell watercolours were some of the better views of the mid-19th-century American whaling industry, until photography became available in the 1850s.

Russell began making lithographs in 1848, and began teaching art in Rhode Island, after the American Civil War ended in 1865.

== Image gallery ==
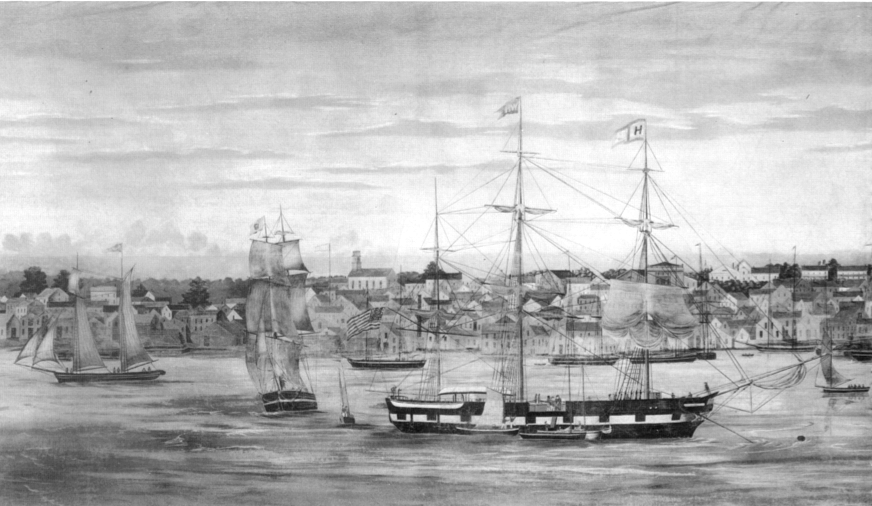
Detail from Whaling Voyage Round the World by Russell & Purrington, ca.1848

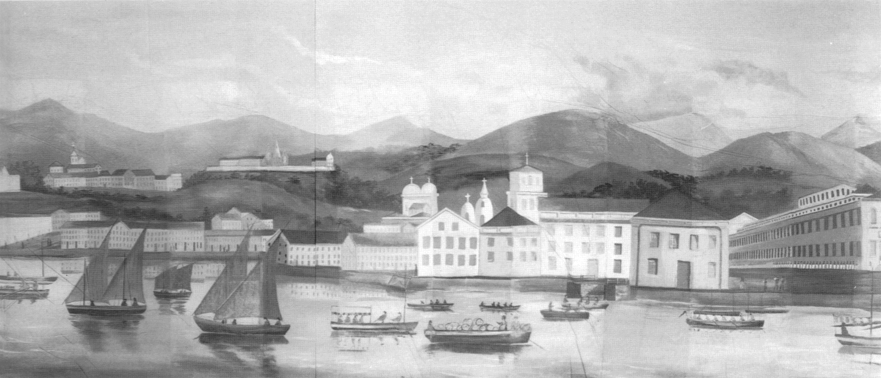
Detail from Whaling Voyage Round the World by Russell & Purrington, ca.1848

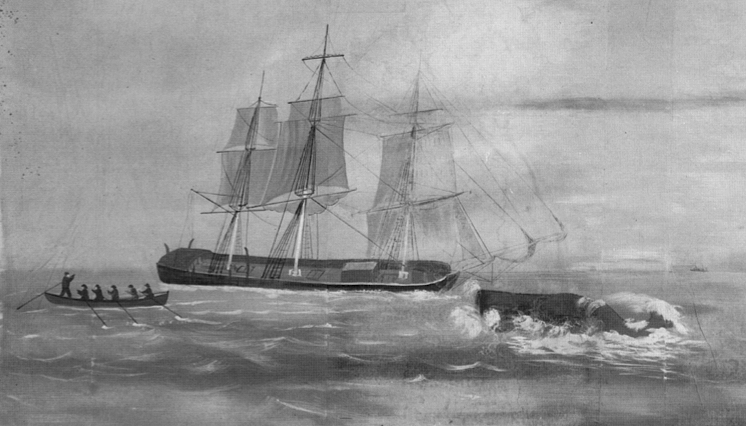
Wreck of the Essex; detail from Whaling Voyage Round the World by Russell & Purrington, ca.1848

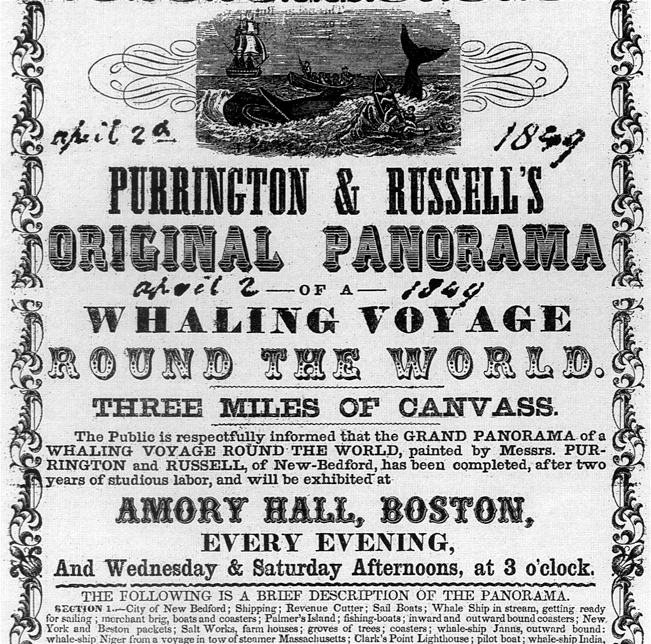
Advertisement for performance at Boston's Amory Hall of Whaling Voyage Round the World, 1849
