= Richard Morrell Staigg =

American painter

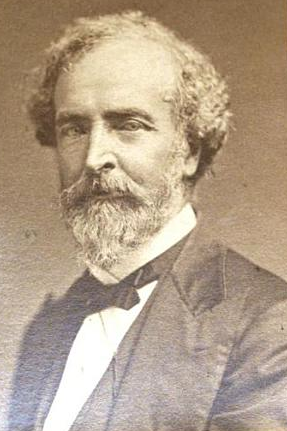
Portrait of R.M. Staigg

Richard Morrell Staigg (7 September 1817 Leeds, England - 11 October 1881 Newport, Rhode Island) or R.M. Staigg was a portrait painter in Boston, Massachusetts, in the 19th century.

== Biography ==
When he was about thirteen years of age he was placed in an architect's office, and he subsequently received a few weeks' instruction in portrait painting. In 1831 he came to the United States with his father, and four years later he settled with the family in Newport. In his artistic efforts he met with encouragement and advice from Washington Allston, and soon devoted himself entirely to miniature painting.

In Boston he kept a studio in Amory Hall. He belonged to the Boston Artists' Association. He was a regular exhibitor at the National Academy of Design, New York City, of which he was elected an associate in 1856, and an academician in 1861. He visited Europe 1867–1869, and again 1872–1874. The last twenty years of his life were devoted to painting life-size portraits in oil, as well as genre pieces and landscapes.

== Works ==
Among his portraits are those of Washington Allston, Edward Everett, Daniel Webster, William H. Prescott, and others. Some of his miniatures were exhibited at the Royal Academy, and received warm praise. Among his works in oil are portraits of himself, of Russell Sturgis and George H. Calvert, and the "Crossing Sweeper," "The Sailor's Grave" (1862), and "Cat's Cradle" (1863).
