= Boston Artists' Association =

The Boston Artists' Association (1841–1851) was established in Boston, Massachusetts by Washington Allston, Henry Sargent, and other painters, sculptors, and architects, in order to organize exhibitions, a school, a workspace for members, and to promote art "for the art's sake."

== History ==
According to the group's constitution: "The artists of Boston, deeply impressed with the importance of their profession, and with the necessity of a systematic course of study for its successful culmination; also with the advantages to be derived from mutual co-operation and support, resolve to form themselves into an association for the furtherance of these objects. In so doing, they pledge to each other their honor as gentlemen, to lay aside all ungenerous, envious, or selfish feelings, and to seek the advancement of the arts alone, for the art's sake."

There were "44 members in 1842, and 66 in 1845." They held "regularly scheduled bi-weekly social meetings" in Chester Harding's space on School Street. In the association's "studio ... both living models and casts were provided for members." The association "had casts donated to them by member Henry Sargent, and negotiated to borrow some of those at the Athenaeum." A school was organized in 1842, overseen by John Pope. Instructors included Samuel P. Long and B.F. Nutting. The school was located at first in Harding's Gallery on School Street, and from 1846 in rented rooms on Tremont Row.

== Images ==
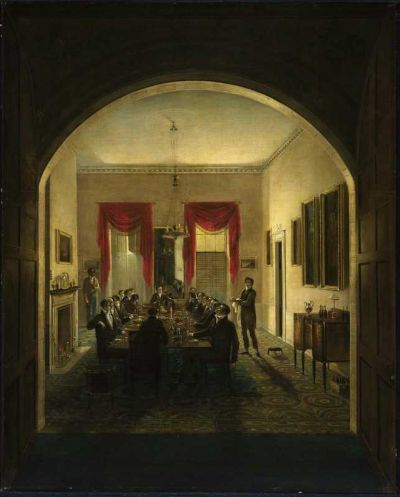
Henry Sargent's The Dinner Party ca.1821; exhibited in the 1st exhibit of the Boston Artists Association, 1842

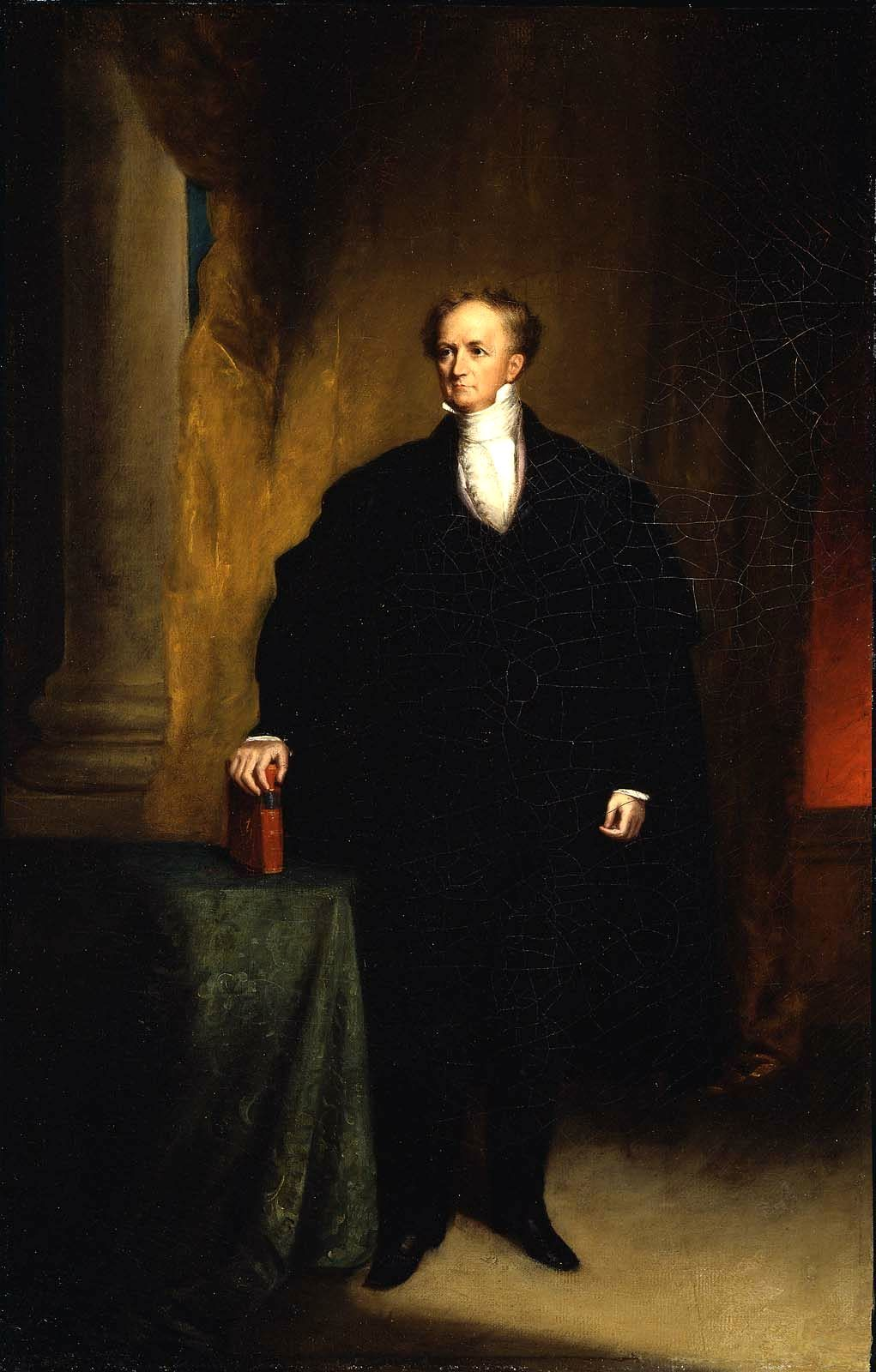
Chester Harding's portrait of Abbott Lawrence, ca.1842; exhibited in the 1st exhibit of the Boston Artists Association, 1842

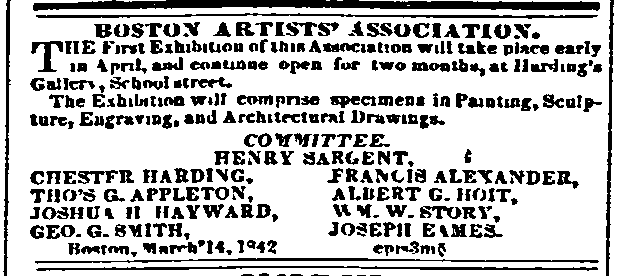
Ad for 1842 exhibit of the Boston Artists Association

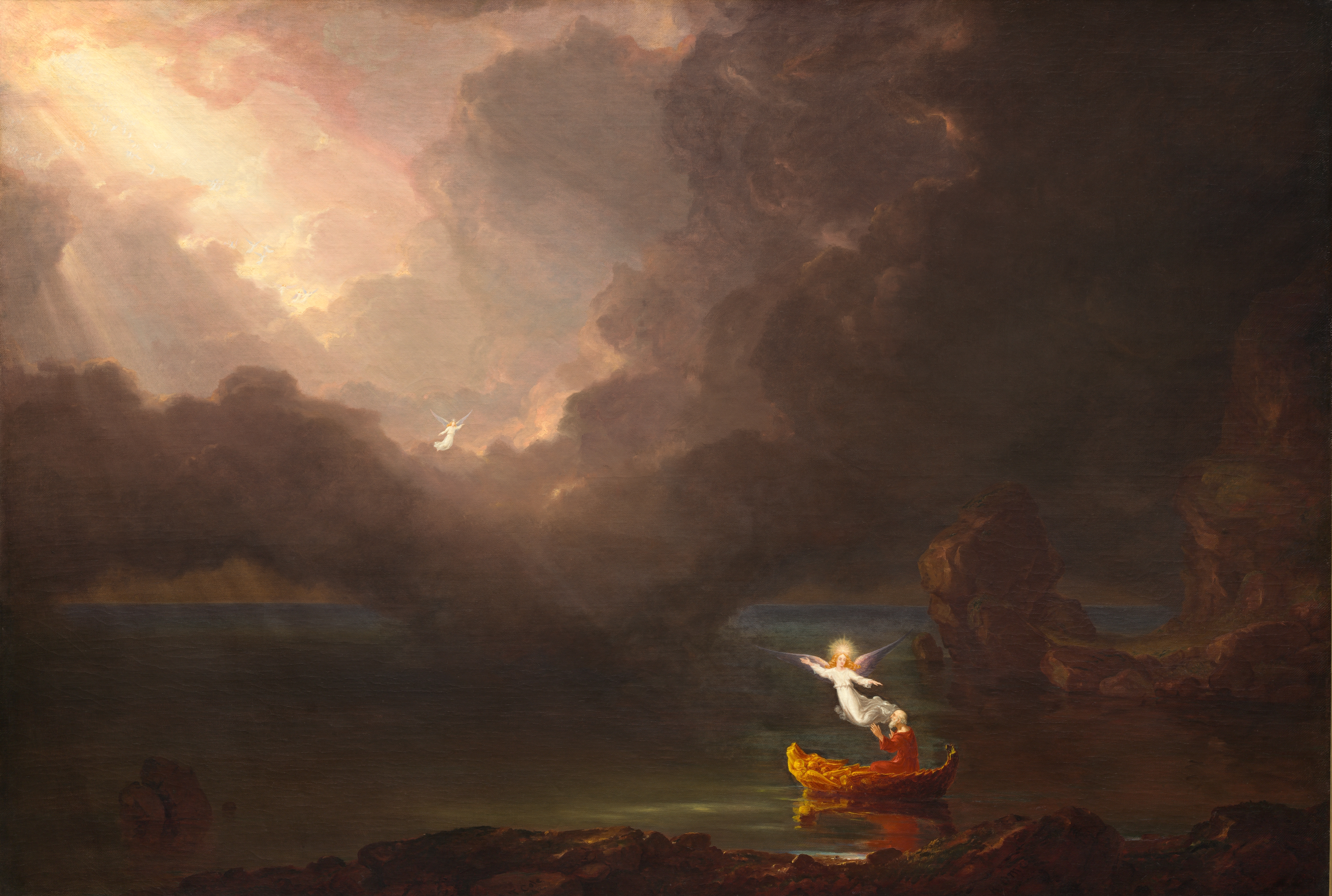
Thomas Cole's Old Age from Voyage of Life, 1842; exhibited in the 2nd exhibit of the Boston Artists Association, 1843

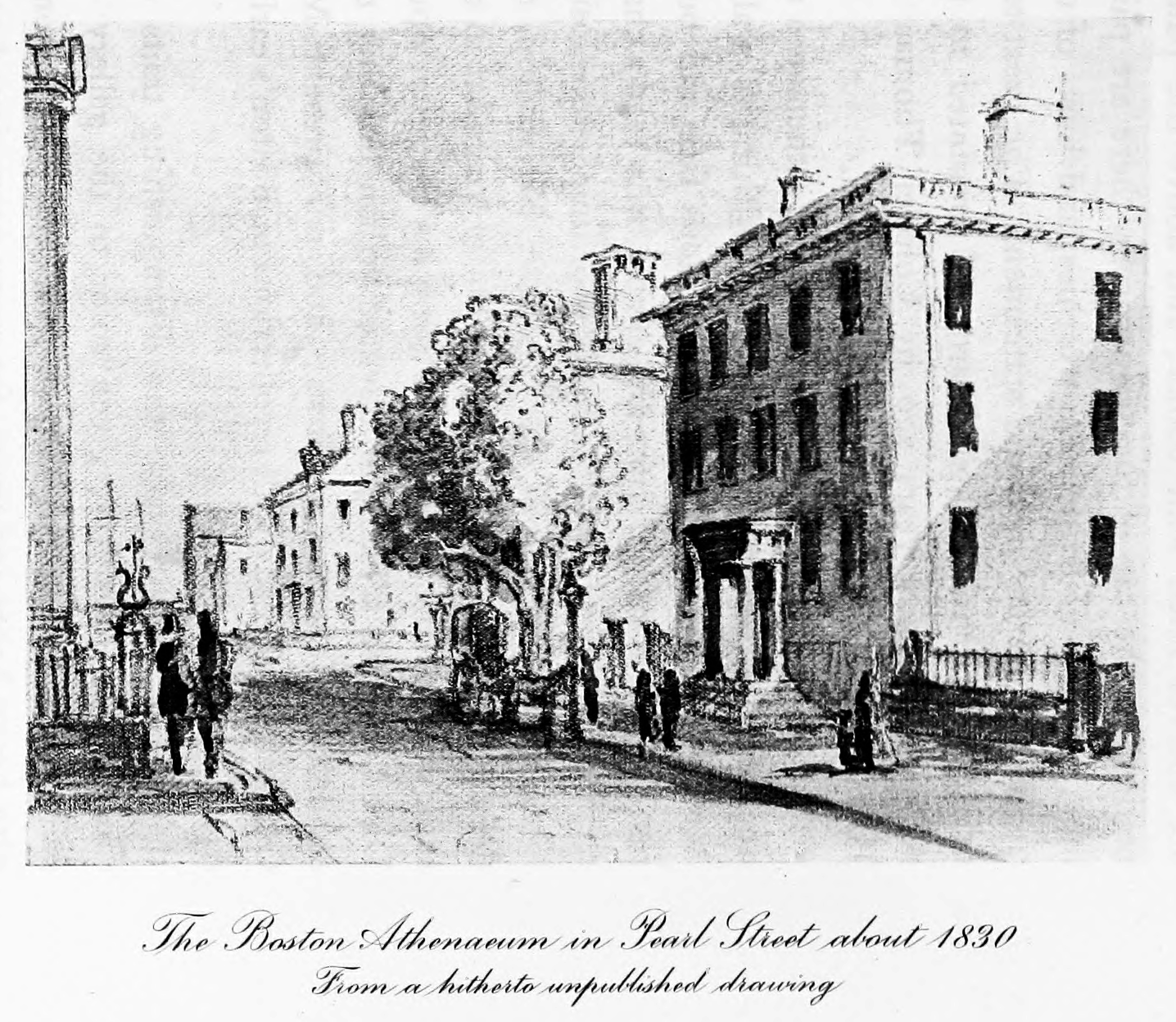
Athenaeum, Pearl Street, where Boston Artists Association exhibits were held, 1845-1847

=== Members ===
- Francis Alexander
- Washington Allston
- Joseph Alexander Ames (i.e. Joseph Eames)
- Joseph Andrews
- Thomas G. Appleton
- Thomas Ball
- Hammatt Billings
- Joseph Edward Billings
- Edward Augustus Brackett
- Joseph Carew
- Henry Dexter
- George Fuller
- Samuel Gerry
- Edward D. Greene
- Henry Greenough
- Richard Saltonstall Greenough
- Chester Harding
- Joshua H. Hayward
- A.G. Hoit
- George Hollingsworth
- Charles Hubbard
- D.C. Johnston
- Charles Lane
- Fitz Hugh Lane
- P. Mallory
- N.B. Onthank
- John Pope
- Henry Cheever Pratt
- Thomas Buchanan Read
- J. Rogers
- Eastman Sanburn
- Henry Sargent
- William Sharp
- George G. Smith
- William E. Smith
- W. Southworth
- Charles J. Sprague
- Richard M. Staigg
- W.W. Story
- Asa Coolidge Warren
- M.J. Whipple
- Ammi B. Young

=== Exhibitions ===
- 1842 - 1st Boston Artists' Association exhibit, at Harding's Gallery. Included: Henry Sargent; Fitz Henry Lane; Tintoretto; Anthony van Dyck; Caroline Negus; and others.
- 1843 - 2nd Boston Artists' Association exhibit, at Harding's Gallery. Included: Thomas Cole; Philip Harry; Asher Brown Durand; Thomas Sully; and others. Lenders to the exhibit: E. Haskett Derby; David Sears; George Howe; T. Whittemore; Boston Museum; C. Kimball; and others.
- 1844 - 3rd Boston Artists' Association exhibit, at Harding's Gallery. Lenders to the exhibit: Professor Ticknor; Mrs. Allston; Col. H. Sargent; T.H. Perkins; Daniel Webster; J.B. Joy; H.C. Stebbins; Mrs. Wheelock.
- 1845 - Joint exhibition of the Boston Artists' Association and the Boston Athenaeum.
- 1846 - Joint exhibition of the Boston Artists' Association and the Boston Athenaeum.
- 1847 - Joint exhibition of the Boston Artists' Association and the Boston Athenaeum.

== See also ==
- Harding's Gallery (Boston)
