= Mercantile Library =

Mercantile Library may refer to:

- New York Mercantile Library (1820), former name of the Center for Fiction, New York City, New York
- Mercantile Library Association (Boston, Massachusetts) (1820)
- Mercantile Library of Cincinnati (1835), Cincinnati, Ohio, also known as Young Men's Mercantile Library
- St. Louis Mercantile Library (1846), University of Missouri–St. Louis, St. Louis, Missouri
- Mercantile Library Association of San Francisco (1852), San Francisco, California, absorbed by San Francisco Mechanics' Institute in 1906
- Saint Paul Public Library (1857), Saint Paul, Minnesota
- Brooklyn Public Library (1857), Brooklyn Public Library Business Library, New York
- Philadelphia Mercantile Library (1866), Philadelphia, Pennsylvania

== See also ==
- Subscription Library
- Mercantile
- Library
