= The Grand Panorama of a Whaling Voyage 'Round the World =

1848 painting by Benjamin Russell and Caleb B. Purrington

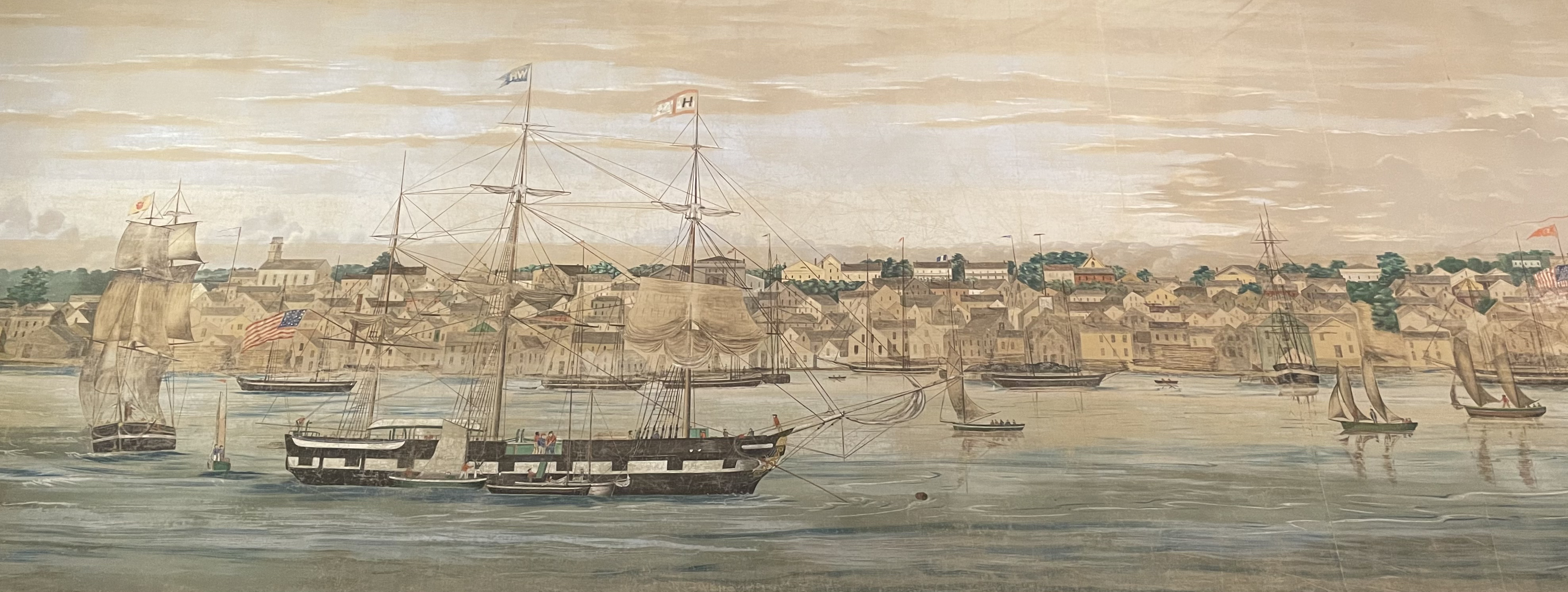
A portion of the panoramic painting featuring New Bedford, Massachusetts.

The Grand Panorama of a Whaling Voyage 'Round the World is a maritime panoramic painting created by Benjamin Russell and Caleb B. Purrington in 1848. Owned by the New Bedford Whaling Museum, who restored it, from March 2025 to March 2026 the panorama will be displayed at the Minnesota Marine Art Museum in Winona, Minnesota. At 1,275 feet in length, it is the longest painting in the United States, longer than the Empire State Building is tall.

== History ==
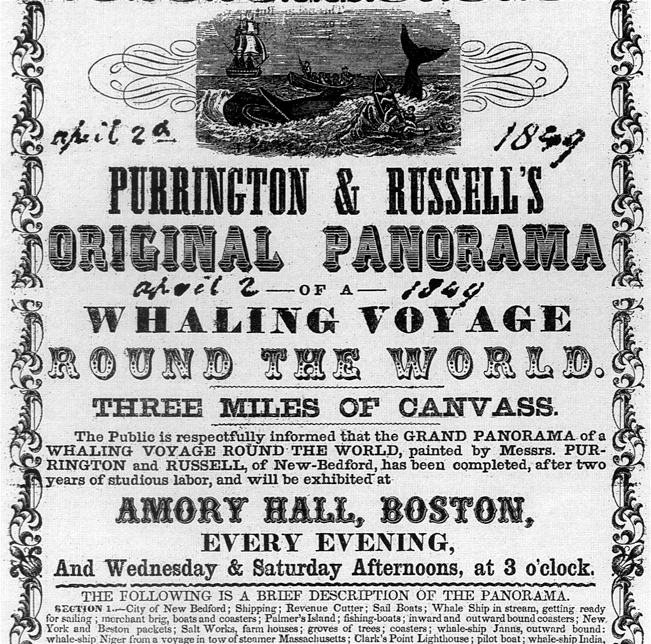
An advertisement for a showing of the panorama at Boston's Amory Hall in 1849.

Benjamin Russell was a notable whaling painter of New Bedford, while Caleb Purrington was a more simple sign painter. The panorama was first displayed in 1848. It was displayed on a proscenium stage, mounted on spools and manually cranked to wind the panorama along, typically accompanied by narration, music, and lighting effects.

The Old Dartmouth Historical Society acquired the panorama in 1918.

== Description ==
The panorama exists in four sections and depicts a whaling voyage around the world in the first half of the 19th century. The Wall Street Journal described it as "surprising in its variety and beauty."

== Restoration ==
Part of the restoration included spraying the painting with diluted adhesive in order to bind the pigment to the cloth and humidify the canvas.

After its restoration, it was displayed in four sections in a gallery exhibition called "A Spectacle in Motion" at the Kilburn Mill in New Bedford, Massachusetts from July 14 to October 8, 2018. As part of the exhibition, and to protect the fragile canvas from further wear, the New Bedford Whaling Museum created a digital video of the panorama show, now viewable on YouTube.
