= New York Mercantile Library =

Not-for-profit organization in New York City

Coordinates: 40°45′22.93″N 73°58′38.23″W

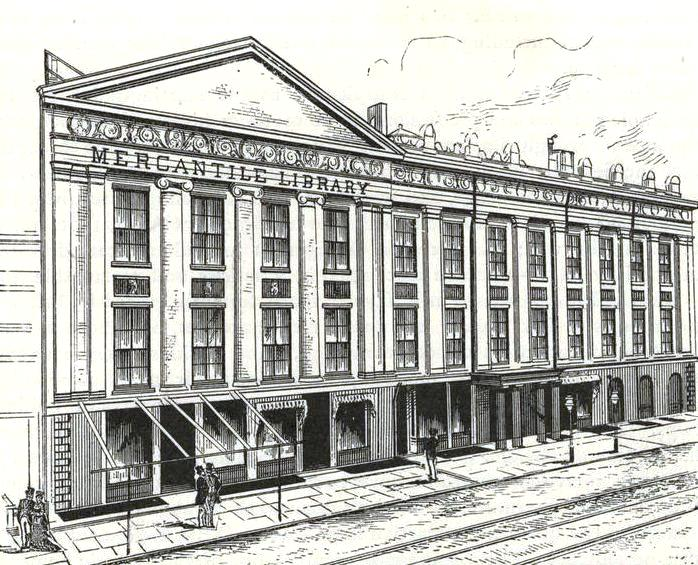
The Mercantile Library in the Astor Opera House building, 1886

The Center for Fiction, originally called the New York Mercantile Library, is a not-for-profit organization in New York City, which works to promote fiction and literature and to give support to writers. It maintains a large circulating library of 20th and 21st century fiction, in addition to many stored volumes of 19th century fiction. It also stocks non-fiction volumes on subjects related to literature. It maintains a Reading Room, operates a curated independent bookstore primarily featuring works of fiction, rents space to writers at low cost, and presents literary programs to the public. The organization also awards the annual Center for Fiction First Novel Prize.

It originated in 1820 as the (New York) Mercantile Library and in 2005 changed its name to the Mercantile Library Center for Fiction, although it presents itself as simply "The Center for Fiction".

The center is one of 17 remaining membership libraries in the United States, three of which are in New York City, It has offices at 15 Lafayette Avenue in Fort Greene, Brooklyn. Prior to their move in early 2018, The Center for Fiction was located at 17 East 47th Street, between Madison and Fifth Avenues in Midtown Manhattan.

== Mercantile Library ==
=== 1820–1853 ===
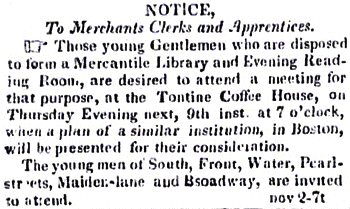
From the New York Commercial Advertiser (November 2, 1820)

The foundation of the Mercantile Library Association was instigated by the New York Chamber of Commerce, which placed newspaper advertisements in November 1820 asking merchant clerks to meet at a local coffee house to discuss forming an organization based on the Mercantile Library in Boston, which had been created earlier that year. The purpose of the new organization was to provide the city's growing population of clerks with an alternative to what were considered to be immoral entertainments and other vices of the city.

The association's first subscription circulating library, which had 700 volumes in rented rooms at 49 Fulton Street in Manhattan, was open to most of the general public, but only merchant clerks were allowed to vote for and be officers in the association. By the year 1826, the financial "prospects brightened to the extent that the officers hired a suite of rooms in the Harpers building on Cliff Street, and starting the reading room, which has continued to be an important part of the institution in all its successive homes." In 1830, the library moved to a new building designed by architect Seth Geer, called Clinton Hall, at Nassau and Beekman Streets, which the Clinton Hall Association, made up of prominent members of the Mercantile Library Association, had raised funds to construct. Frequent lectures were presented by the library, including by Ralph Waldo Emerson and Oliver Wendell Holmes Sr.

In addition to reading materials, as of the 1850s the association owned "a cabinet of minerals and shells, a collection of revolutionary medals, miscellaneous coins, various paintings, statue of the 'Dancing Girl Reposing', Minerva, and a bust of Philip Stone.

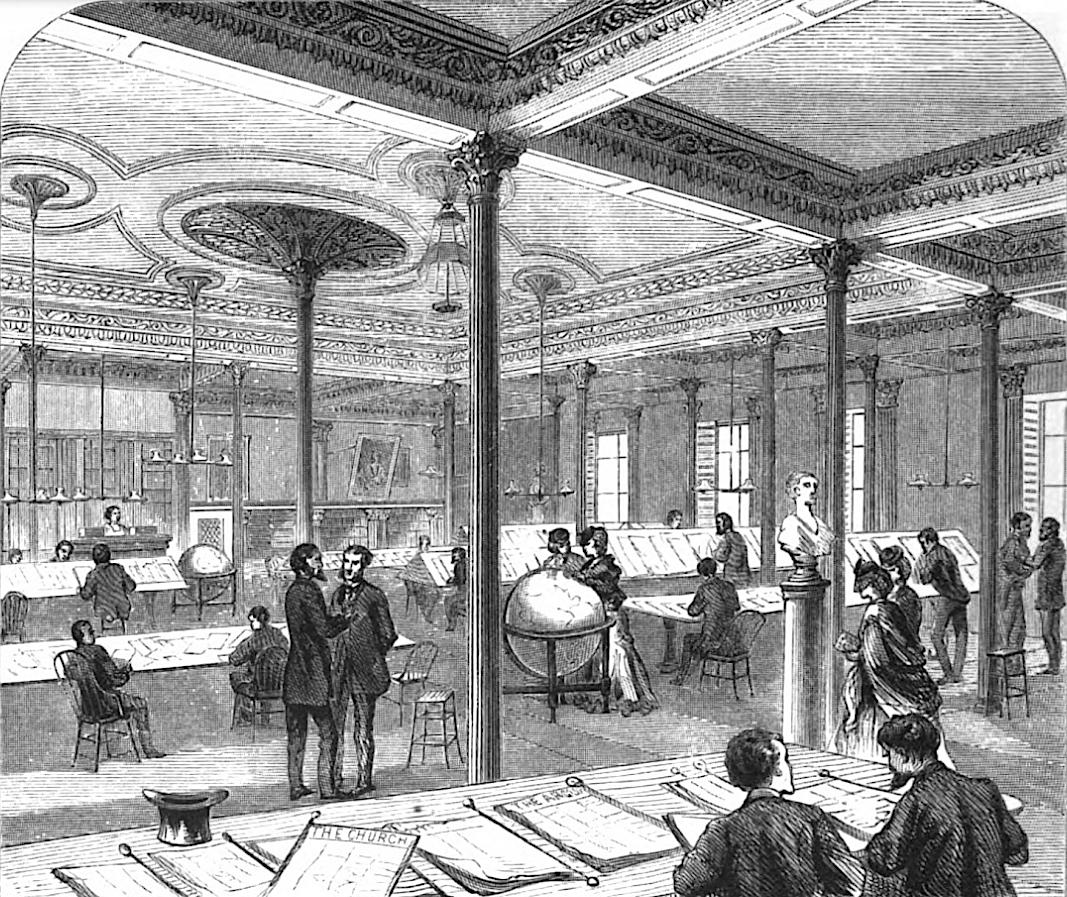
Reading room, Mercantile Library Association, New York City, circa 1871

=== 1854–1960s ===
By 1853, the association had over 4,000 members and over 30,000 volumes, and in 1854, the library moved again, this time uptown to the Astor Opera House building on Lafayette Street between Astor Place and East 8th Street. The opera house had closed its doors as a result of the Astor Place riot of 1849, and the building was sold for $140,000 to the association, which renamed it "Clinton Hall" and moved the library there as a place which was more convenient to its members. At its new location, the association offered classes and public lectures, including by Frederick Douglass, William Thackeray, and Mark Twain, and functioned as a cultural center.

Membership during this period reached at least 12,000, while the library itself amassed 120,000 volumes, making it the largest circulating library in the United States at the time. By 1872 the library contained works of biography; history, geography and travels; literature; mathematics; medical science; mental and moral science; natural sciences; political science; the arts; and theology. However, because the library did not stay open late at night, its services were not generally available to the working class, a deficit which was remedied when the Cooper Union opened a block east on Astor Place: its reading room was open until 10 p.m.

In 1891, requiring more space, the association tore down the opera house and replaced it with an 11-story building designed by George E. Harney, which it also named "Clinton Hall". The new building featured a reading room on the top floor that was two stories high, and was to remain the headquarters for its library operations, which included 7 branches, until 1920, when it relocated to rented space. However, in 1932, the library once again had its own building, at 17 East 47th Street, designed by Henry Otis Chapman. Here, the association maintained its 230,000 volumes to serve 3,000 subscribers. The library at this time still had branches at 149 Broadway at Liberty Street and 598 Madison Avenue at 57th Street.

=== 1970s–2000s ===
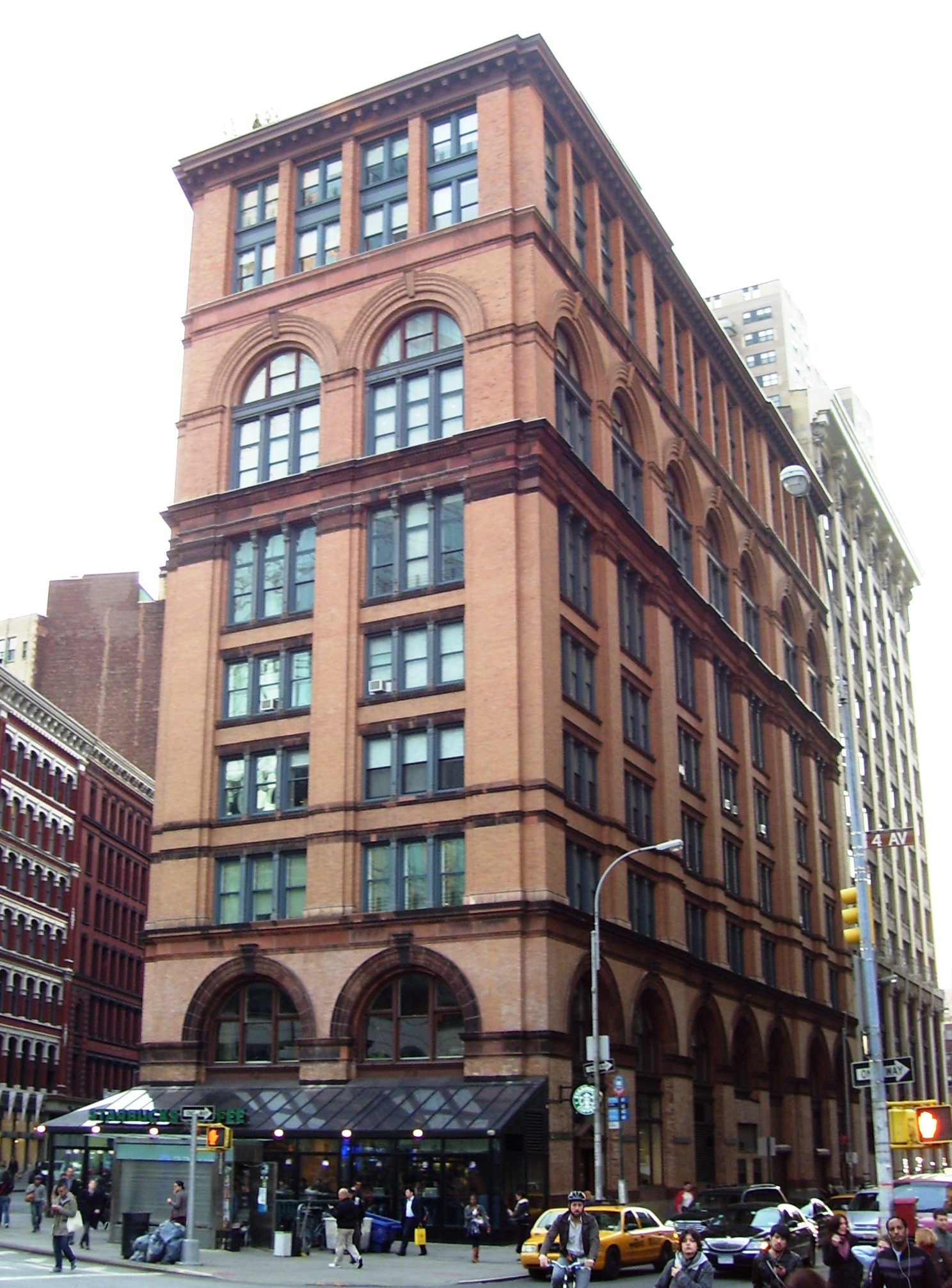
11-story Clinton Hall building replaced the Opera House as headquarters. In later years it was the Chinese consulate, a union headquarters, the Astor Place Hotel, an office building, and, currently, condominiums.

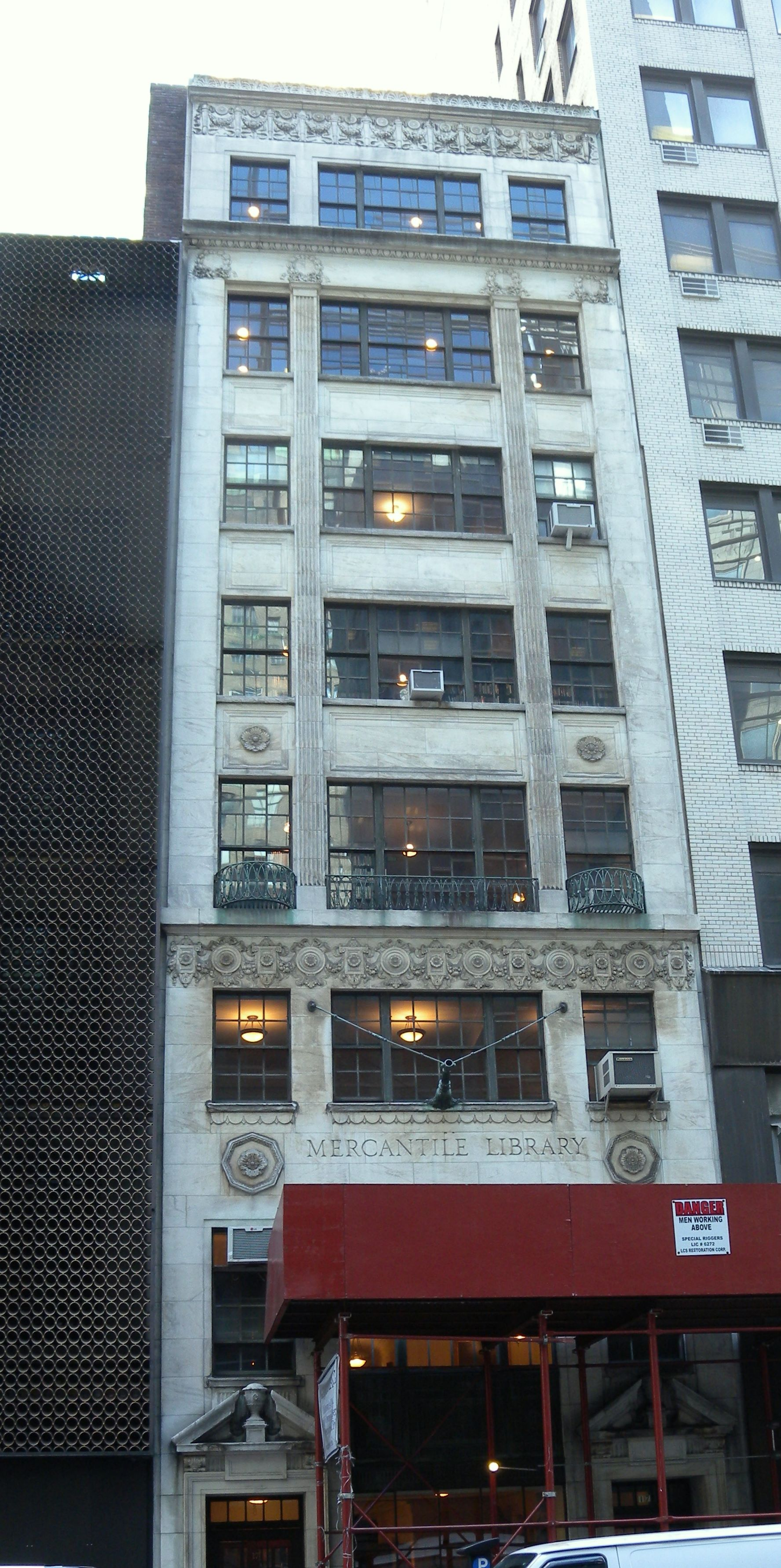
The Center for Fiction's headquarters at 17 East 47th Street, which it sold sometime after 2008.

Membership in the library declined through the following decades, and the library sold off parts of its collection in the 1970s. "In 1971 the theological collection was sold, in 1977 the foreign language collection was sold." It also attempted a merger with Pace College, but this did not occur. By 1987 the library was in financial distress, and closed for the summer of 1987, and then indefinitely in 1989, at a time when its membership was only 375 people. The association subsequently reorganized and reopened, with a new focus on fiction and literature.

In 1998, the ground floor of the building was renovated by Beyer Blinder Belle. The library – colloquially known as "The Merc" – had considered moving to a new location in 2008, but subsequently decided to remain at its historic Midtown Manhattan location.

== Center for Fiction, 2005–present ==
The Center for Fiction (2026)

Since 2005 known as The Center for Fiction, the organization presents a diverse program of free or low-cost public events, featuring over 100 authors, translators, and critics each year. The Center also offers reading groups and writing workshops.

In May 2018, the organization announced that it would be moving its headquarters to a new building in Fort Greene, Brooklyn called Caesura and designed by Dattner Architects. The 17,500-square-foot (1,630 m^{2}) space includes a member library with a Members Lounge and Reading Room, classrooms, a writers studio, an auditorium for 160 people, a bookstore and a cafe/bar. The Center is a home for readers and writers that serves as a gathering place for the literary community. The three-story building will be co-owned with the Mark Morris Dance Group and a real estate company, which will have their own spaces there. The Center for Fiction was designed by Julie Nelson, Partner at BKSK Architects LLP and opened in 2019.

== Awards ==
The Center for Fiction bestows a number of awards annually:

- The First Novel Prize is awarded to the best debut novel of the year. First awarded in 2006, the winner receives $15,000 with each shortlisted author receiving $1,000.
- The Center for Fiction Medal of Editorial Excellence honors the work of an editor, publisher, or agent who over the course of his or her career has discovered, nurtured and championed writers of fiction in the United States.
- The Center for Fiction Lifetime of Excellence in Fiction Award honors a writer who, through their exceptional body of work, has significantly shaped our culture and perspective. The award is not given annually; rather, it is bestowed upon an author at the discretion of The Center for Fiction Board of Directors. Winners have included Wole Soyinka (2022), Kazuo Ishiguro (2021), and Toni Morrison (2018).
- The Center for Fiction On Screen Award recognizes adaptations of works of fiction for film or television and is awarded to both the creators of the adaptation and the author of the original work.

Additionally, The Center for Fiction/Susan Kamil Emerging Writer Fellowships grant 9 New York City early-career writers with a $5,000 stipend, editorial mentorship and networking opportunities with publishing professionals, membership to The Center's Writers Studio, two public readings, publication in an anthology, and more over the course of a year.

== See also ==
- Mercantile Library (disambiguation)
- Mercantile Library Association (Boston, Massachusetts)
- New York Public Library
- Astor Library Building
