= Signor Blitz =

British magician and performer

Signor Blitz (born Antonio van Zandt; 21 June 1810, in Deal, Kent, England – 28 January 1877, in Philadelphia, Pennsylvania, United States) was a British magician and performer.

== Career as a magician ==
van Zandt started performing at the age of thirteen in Hamburg, Germany, billed as Signor Blitz. After traveling for two years in northern Europe, he returned to England, appearing first in Dover in December 1825. He then visited Ireland and Scotland. In 1834, he went to the United States, and, after performing in New York City, traveled throughout that country. Later he visited Canada and the West Indies. On his return from the south he settled in Philadelphia, where he resided until his death.

One of Signor Blitz's best-known performances was a trick in which a loaded gun was pointed at him and he would catch the bullet in his hands. However, he stopped showing it because of the risky nature of the trick. He also combined ventriloquism during his long show making quips with his dummy (Bobby) as well as making sound effects.

== Personal life ==
He married and had four children. After his first wife died, he married again in 1863.

== Autobiography ==
Blitz wrote the autobiography Fifty Years in the Magic Circle.

== Death ==
Six years after writing his autobiography, he died of consumption in his home in Philadelphia, Pennsylvania.

== Sources ==
- Levitt, Gerald M. (2000). The Turk, Chess Automaton. Jefferson, North Carolina: McFarland. ISBN 978-0-7864-0778-1.
