= Amos Fortune =

Amos Fortune (c. 1710 – November 1801) was an African-American citizen of Jaffrey, New Hampshire, in the 18th century. Fortune was born in Africa and brought to America as an enslaved person. He was given the name "Amos Fortune" by his masters. He purchased his freedom at the age of 60 and moved to Jaffrey to start a leather tannery business. Documents now archived at the Jaffrey Public Library testify to his literacy, community position, and financial success.

== Purchase of freedom ==
The first record of Amos Fortune is an unsigned "freedom paper" dated December 30, 1763. In it, Fortune's owner, Ichabod Richardson, a "tanner of Woburn, in the province of Massachusetts-bay in New England," outlines an agreement with Fortune that at the end of four years, Amos would be "Discharged, Freed, and Set at Liberty from my service power & Command forever...." When Richardson died unexpectedly in 1768, his will contained no mention of Fortune's freedom. Fortune then negotiated with Richardson's heirs to "pay off his bond." He made the last payment in 1770 and subsequently purchased his freedom.

After purchasing his freedom, Fortune continued to live and work in Woburn. He bought land and built a house with help from his first mistress's family. He purchased his first wife from Josiah Bowers of Billerica, but she died within a year of their marriage. On November 9, 1779, Fortune purchased the freedom of a woman named Violet (also spelled Violate, including on her tombstone) from James Baldwin. They were married the next day in Woburn. Violate and Amos adopted a daughter, Celyndia, after they were married.

== Life in Jaffrey ==
In 1781, Fortune moved to Jaffrey to establish himself as a tanner. His first home and tannery were at the foot of a hill west of what is now the Jaffrey Center Common (located in the Jaffrey Center Historic District) on land set aside for a yet-to-be-named minister. A year later, Laban Ainsworth was called to be Jaffrey's first minister. Fortune remained on the property, and the two men appeared to have become friends.

In 1789, Fortune purchased 25 acres (100,000 m^{2}) at another location on Tyler Brook. The house and barn he built still stand in their original location. The road the house is on is now called Amos Fortune Road.

Fortune's tannery appears to have prospered. He took on at least two apprentices and served clients in Massachusetts and nearby New Hampshire towns. He became a full member of the First Church. Additionally, though a former enslaved person, Fortune was a literate man. In 1797, he was a leading founder in establishing the Social Library, the town's first library. Years later, he was commissioned by this library to rebind a collection of books.

== Death ==
Fortune died in November 1801 at the age of 91. He is buried behind the Jaffrey Meetinghouse in the Old Burying Ground. The inventory of his estate testifies to his prosperity. Among the items listed are silver shoe buckles, a silver watch, and a fur coat. Many of the items were sold, and due to the precise details documented, it is known to amount to $770.20. Fortune instructed his executor, Eleazer, to have "hand stones" erected to his wife and himself and to make a "handsome present" to the church. The remaining money, totaling about $233, was given to the town to support Schoolhouse Number 7. This last bequest has evolved into the Amos Fortune Fund and has supported diverse projects, including public speaking contests and special publications. The Jaffrey Public Library now administers the Fund, using the income to develop and distribute educational materials on Amos Fortune.

Violet Fortune died in 1802, one year after her husband, and was buried next to him. Their epitaphs were written by the Reverend Laban Ainsworth:

Sacred

to the memory of Amos Fortune, who was born free in Africa, a slave in America, he purchased Liberty, professed Christianity, lived reputably, and died hopefully,

November 17, 1801, AEt. 91

Sacred

to the memory of Violate, by sale the slave of Amos Fortune, by marriage his wife, by her fidelity, his friend and solace, she died his widow

September 13, 1802, AEt. 73

== Legacy ==
Elizabeth Yates wrote a Newbery Medal-winning biographical novel entitled Amos Fortune, Free Man, in 1950. Amos Fortune Day was celebrated on February 20, 1955, created by New Hampshire Governor Lane Dwinell. F. Alexander Magoun's 1964 novel Amos Fortune's Choice is a fictional biography of Fortune's life.

A 1997 short film by Matthew Buckingham, Amos Fortune Road, meditates on the scantness and fragility of the surviving historical record regarding Fortune.

Fortune is featured on a New Hampshire historical marker (number 13) along New Hampshire Route 124 in Jaffrey. The Black Heritage Trail of New Hampshire unveiled a marker honoring Fortune in Jaffrey in 2023.

== See also ==
- List of enslaved people
