= Amos Fortune (disambiguation) =

Amos Fortune (c. 1710 – 1801) was an African-American slave who purchased his freedom.

Amos Fortune may also refer to:

- Amos Fortune (character), DC Comics villain
- Amos Fortune, Free Man, 1951 children's novel
