= Young's Hotel (Boston) =

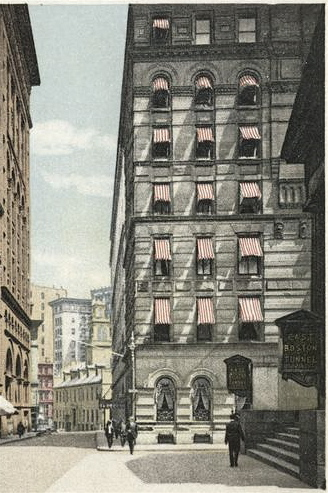
- Young's Hotel, Court Street, Boston, c.1910s

General information
- Location: Court Street; Financial District, Boston
- Coordinates: 42°21′31.96″N 71°3′29.2″W
- Completed: 1860
- Renovated: 1882
- Closed: 1927
- Demolished: 1940
- Owner: George Young

Design and construction
- Architect: William Washburn

Young's Hotel (1860–1927) in Boston, Massachusetts, was located on Court Street in the Financial District, in a building designed by William Washburn. George Young established the business, later taken over by Joseph Reed Whipple and George G. Hall. Guests at Young's included Mark Twain, Elizabeth Cady Stanton, William Lloyd Garrison, Charles Sumner, Rutherford B. Hayes, and numerous others.

== History ==
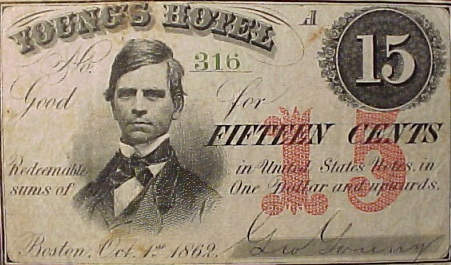
Private currency issued by Young's Hotel, 1862. The individual depicted is Nathaniel Banks, former Massachusetts governor and Civil War general.)

Prior to opening his hotel, Connecticut-born George Young had worked for the Hampden House, Springfield, Mass.; United States Hotel, Worcester; and the Old Cornhill Coffee-House, Boston. In 1850 he bought the Cornhill Coffee-House from its aged proprietor, Mr. Taft. "In 1860 the Fifty Associates erected a new building [on the site of the coffee-house], known as 'Young's Hotel,' of which Mr. Young continued as proprietor. In 1876 he sold out his interest" for $65,000 to Joseph Reed Whipple and George G. Hall (former employees of Parker's Hotel).

Young's became one of the first buildings in Boston installed with electric lights (1881). Whipple & Hall built an addition on the hotel in 1882. Frank Hill Smith designed its dining room: "a large and rather low studded apartment, broken by pilasters and beams into three bays. At the end of it is a long mantel and fire-place. ... The walls ... are covered above the red mahogany wainscot with stamped leather of golden arabesque figurings on a groundwork of reddish brown. The semi-circular arches over the windows are filled with stained glass. ... The mantel curves into the room, and is supported by Ionic columns quite clear of the carved griffins. The fireplace is highly ornamental, and is built up of the Chelsea tile, the main feature of which is a bas-relief of dancing figures. Chandeliers and side-sconces of brass in dead finish brighten the room at the proper points, and the outer light is shaded by fleecy hangings. ... This room is 100 feet long by 31 feet wide, and has tables of various size for seating 150 guests."

In the 1880s, according to one report, "Boston's chief center of mild dissipation is Young's Hotel" with its pool tables and card-playing Harvard students. "The billiard room at Young's -- the most frequent in town -- is very much like all other billiard rooms, save for its extra gorgeousness. There are always to be seen the expert players at the exhibition tables, who perform all sorts of bewildering caroms, as if unconscious of the admiring crowd that looks on." Further, "here one may see in the afternoon or evening the swellest students from Harvard, in cape coats and patent leather shoes exhibiting the very latest fashions in dress, and toting canes like small trees knobbed with silver. ... You need not be surprised if, as you pass the hotel desk, you see a party of five or six young men inquiring for a room ... [for a] poker party." After a "disturbance" in 1891, Whipple decreed the hotel would "allow no large bodies of Harvard students to dine ... hereafter."

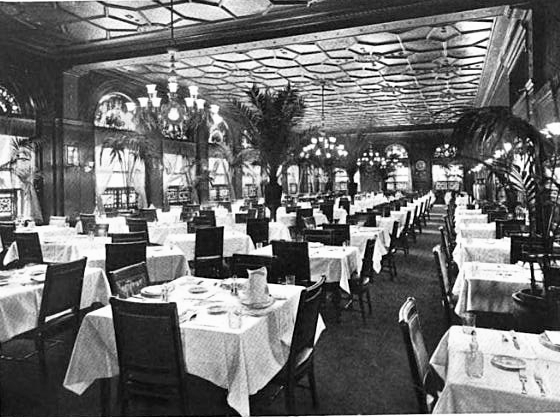
Young's dining room, c. 1910

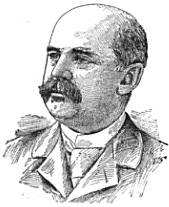
Portrait of J.R. Whipple, proprietor, c. 1893

J.R. Whipple continued as owner when the partnership with George Hall dissolved in 1887. Around this time Whipple & Co. also owned the Parker House hotel and Hotel Touraine. In 1892 he instituted an employee policy "compelling all ... waiters to remove their beards." The Boston Waiters' Alliance "embracing every hotel and restaurant in the city" resolved to resist, and were prepared to strike if Whipple fired "those who do not comply."

A travel guidebook described Young's in 1895: "The main entrance to this hotel is on Court Avenue, and the hotel extends to Court Square and Court Street. It is one of the largest and best of the hotels on the European plan. One of the features of this hotel is the ladies' dining-room, the entrance to which is on the Court Street side. This is a handsomely decorated room 100 feet long and 31 feet wide. It connects with other large dining-rooms, and a cafe for gentlemen on the ground floor. This hotel is a favorite place with New Yorkers. ... Recognized as among the best [hotel restaurants in the city] are those connected with Young's Hotel, the Parker House, and the Adams House. That of Young's Hotel is very extensive, occupying a large part of the ground floor of that establishment. It has dining-rooms for ladies and gentlemen, lunch rooms, and convenient lunch and oyster counters."

The hotel closed in 1927. Thereafter the building was temporarily occupied by the Boston Weather Service (1929–1933). The structure was demolished around 1940.

== Hotel guests ==
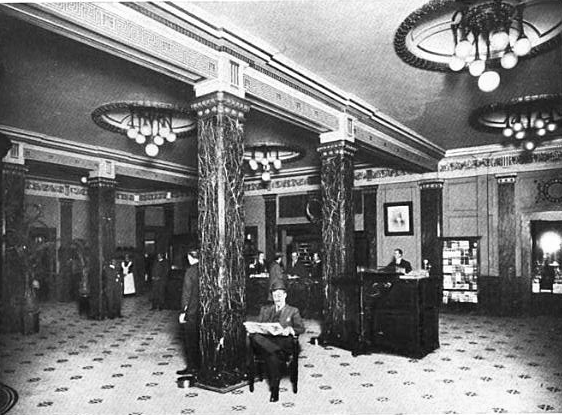
Young's Hotel lobby, c. 1910

- Mark Twain and Joseph Twichell after their (aborted) attempt to walk "from Hartford to Boston, a distance of about a hundred miles," 1874
- Frederick Jackson Turner, 1887

== Events at the hotel ==
=== 19th century ===
- 1865
  - Massachusetts Democratic State Central Committee meeting
- 1870
  - "Mrs. Elizabeth Cady Stanton dined informally with the Bird Club ... as a guest of the club"
- 1871
  - New England Commissioners of fisheries meeting
  - New England Associated Press annual meeting
  - "Bird Club" reunion/tribute on the "25th anniversary of the first open schism in the Whig party of this state on the slavery question;" speeches by Charles Sumner, Francis William Bird, Charles Francis Adams Jr., E. Rockwood Hoar, Marshall Jewell
- 1873
  - "Boston Grange, Order of Patrons of Husbandry" established
- 1874
  - 13th New Hampshire Infantry Regiment officers' reunion
  - Benjamin F. Butler "feasted ... by his past political friends"
- 1877
  - Massachusetts 22nd Infantry and 3rd Battery Association annual dinner and reunion
  - Loyal Legion reception for President Rutherford B. Hayes

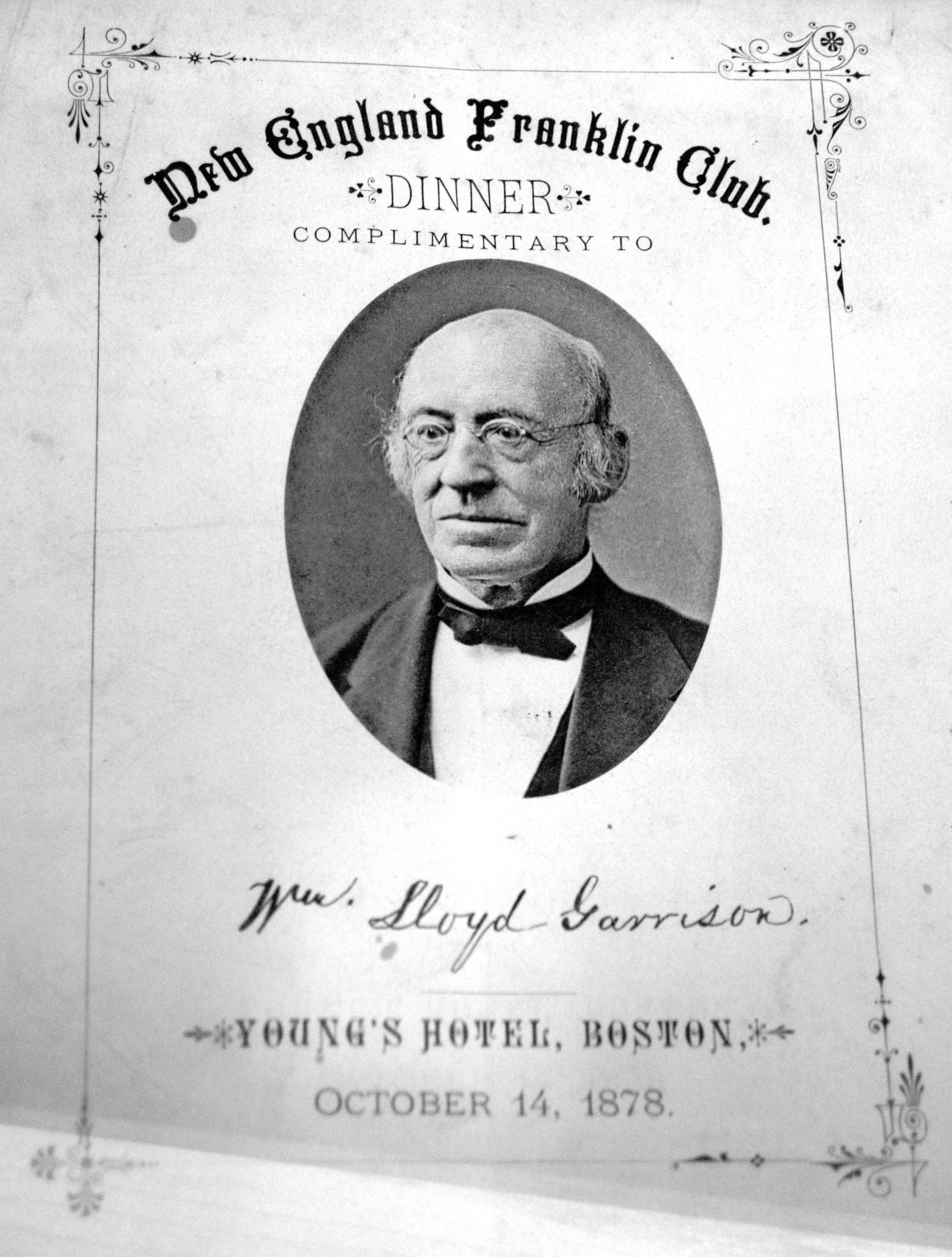
Menu cover for dinner honoring William Lloyd Garrison, 1878

- 1878
  - Dinner of the New England Franklin Club, "complimentary to William Lloyd Garrison"
- 1879
  - Mason & Hamlin Organ Co. 25th anniversary dinner
  - New Hampshire Club established
- 1880
  - "Farewell dinner to Francis Ellingwood Abbot, on retiring from the editorship of 'The Index'"
  - "Charlestown Cadets entertained the Guards at their annual dinner"
  - Lunch for Ulysses S. Grant, hosted by the State Central Committee
- 1883
  - Boston Society of Civil Engineers 1st annual dinner
- 1884
  - Nov. 22 - Charles H. Hill "eats crow" after Grover Cleveland defeats James G. Blaine in the U.S. presidential election. As reported in a local newspaper: "Before the election an agreement was made between Charles H. Hill and Fred W. Webber of Newton that if Cleveland was elected Hill was to eat crow, and if Blaine won Webber was to eat crow. This morning a crow was killed and sent to Young's hotel. At 6:30 o'clock to night, in the presence of Dr. Webber and eighteen other gentlemen, Mr. Hill sat down to a crow feast which had been prepared, and in anticipation of which he had been fasting since yesterday."
  - Beacon Society's Commercial Club and Merchants Club dinner
- 1886
  - Founding of Boston College Alumni Association and first annual meeting June 28, 1886. According to the Boston Globe: "The first annual dinner of the Boston College Alumni Association was held at Young's Hotel and a large number of graduates of that institution assembled to make merry around the festive board. Previous to the dinner a business meeting was held, at which it was unanimously voted to admit to the association none but the graduates of the college."
- 1888
  - Boston Life Underwriter's Association meeting
- 1889
  - Cambridge Club "Ladies Night"
  - Inglewood Fish and Game Corporation annual meeting

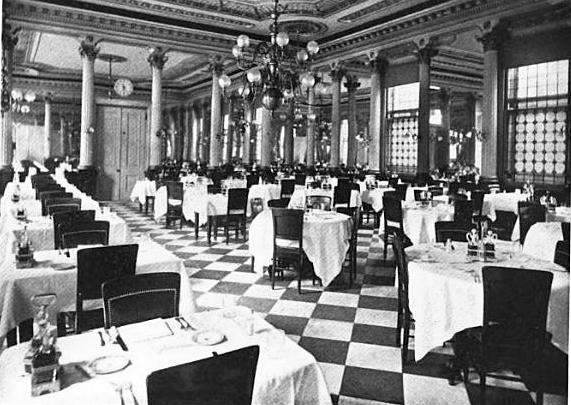
"Men's Dining Room," Young's, c. 1910

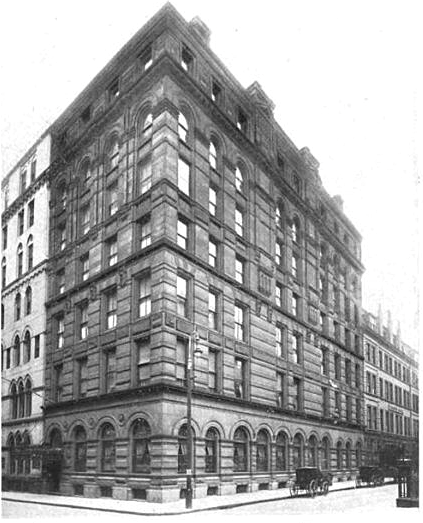
Young's Hotel, Court St., Boston, c. 1910

- 1890
  - American Academy of Dental Science annual meeting
  - Boston Law School alumni dinner
- 1891
  - 5th Massachusetts Battery Light Artillery Association 21st reunion meal
  - Boston Society of Civil Engineers annual dinner
  - Textile Club meeting
- 1892
  - Theta Delta Chi fraternity banquet
- 1894
  - Boston Druggists annual meeting
  - Dorchester Yacht Club annual dinner
- 1895
  - Chickatawbut Club annual meeting and dinner
- 1896
  - Theta Delta Chi fraternity annual convention
  - Boston Life Underwriters' Association annual meeting
  - James H. Eckels, Comptroller of the Currency, addresses the Massachusetts Reform Club
  - 25th Anniversary of the founding of the Apollo Club of Boston, men's chorus, with invited guest the Mendelssohn Glee Club of New York, dinner held May 17, 1896. [54](Event invitation, archives Apollo Club of Boston held in custody by the Massachusetts Historical Society.)
- 1897
  - Boston City Hospital Club annual meeting
  - New Hampshire Club dinner
- 1899
  - Boston Boot and Shoe Club dinner

=== 20th century ===
- 1905
  - Boston Co-operative Flower Growers' Association annual meeting and dinner
- 1906
  - Kappa Delta Phi fraternity convention
- 1907
  - County of Middlesex Bar Association, "complimentary dinner to Charles F. McIntire"
- 1908
  - New England Railroad Club meeting
- 1909
  - Seventh Annual Dinner of the Members by Inheritance of the Massachusetts Commandery of the Military Order of the Loyal Legion of the United States, and One Hundredth Anniversary of the Birth of Abraham Lincoln
- 1912
  - New England Association of Gas Engineers annual meeting
- 1914
  - National Bank Cashiers' Association of Massachusetts, annual meeting and dinner
- 1915
  - Harry Kendall Thaw, William Travers Jerome and guests dine, en route to New York
- 1920
  - New England Confectioners' Club dinner
- 1921
  - Foundation of the British Officers' Club of New England
