= Nora S. Unwin =

British wood engraver and book illustrator

Nora Spicer Unwin (22 February 1907 – 1 January 1982) was a wood engraver, book illustrator and writer. She was born near London, England, in a family already renowned for publishing and printing circles and for founding three different publishing houses, most notably Allen & Unwin.

== England ==
Unwin was educated at Surbiton High School and grew up with a passion for art. Her parents converted the upstairs nursery of their Surrey home into Unwin's first art studio. She enrolled in Leon Underwood’s prestigious London art school, then continued her training at the Kingston School of Art and the Royal College of Art where she received a diploma in design in 1932. During these eight years of specialized training, she explored several mediums including book illustration, pottery, wood engraving, embroidery, bookbinding, mural decoration, engraving, etching, and architecture.

Best known for her work in book illustration and wood engraving, her first commissioned illustration, a dust jacket for Edith Nesbit's Five of Us—and Madeline, came at the age of eighteen. While at the Royal Academy two of her wood engravings were selected for the British Museum's collection. After graduating, she began to teach part-time while illustrating children's books on the side. She credits a wartime job where she had the opportunity to work with children as well as living in a rural setting as influences on her book illustrations.

== The Americas ==
Unwin's interest in children's literature was enhanced by her friendship with the American children's book author Elizabeth Yates, whom she met in London in 1937 and with whom she would later collaborate with on numerous book projects. Yates returned to the United States and settled in Peterborough, New Hampshire in 1939. Unwin subsequently followed in 1946 and remained in the United States for the rest of her life. The rural New England setting of Peterborough and the surrounding Monadnock region provided inspiration for many of her illustrations and woodcuts.

In 1955, Unwin traveled and studied in Mexico, then settled in Wellesley, Massachusetts to be closer to Boston and its cultural life. There, she continued to illustrate books and also resumed teaching art. In 1962, Unwin moved back to Peterborough, New Hampshire, where she resumed her close collaboration with Yates. Unwin remained in Peterborough teaching, exhibiting her art, and illustrating many books until her death in 1982.

== Books and illustrations ==
Unwin contributed illustrations to more than 100 books by other authors, and wrote and illustrated twelve books of her own. She wrote her first book, Lucy and the Little Red Horse, in 1943 with her friend Gwendy Caroe.

She was a member of the National Academy of Design in New York. She earned a Newbery mention jointly with Yates for Mountain Born, and a Newbery Medal for Amos Fortune, Free Man. Among her other major works are the detailed woodcuts for John Kieran’s 1947 Footnotes on Nature, and her children's book Poquito: The Little Mexican Duck, based on her observations on poverty inspired by her trip to Mexico in 1955.

== Legacy ==
Late in her life, Unwin made plans to leave the contents of her Peterborough studio to the Sharon Arts Center in Sharon, New Hampshire. The collection, including wood engravings, sketchbooks, drawings, linoleum prints, collagraphs and collages, was held by the Sharon Arts Center until its merger with the New Hampshire Institute of Art in Manchester, New Hampshire. Later, the New Hampshire Institute of Art merged with New England College in Henniker, New Hampshire. In 2022, New England College donated the Nora S. Unwin Collection to the Monadnock Center for History and Culture in Peterborough, New Hampshire.

The University of Oregon Libraries, Special Collections and Archives, maintains a comprehensive collection of correspondence, illustrations, manuscripts, and other material spanning the years 1926 - 1973. The University of Southern Mississippi McCain Library and Archives de Grummond Collection also has a small collection of correspondence and manuscript notes related to several books by Elizabeth Yates with illustrations by Nora S. Unwin.

Ownership of publishing rights for her works are unclear, and efforts to license her works for a series of feature animations were awaiting pending clarification of ownership and options.

== Family ==
Unwin was a twin and one of five children. She never married.
