= Fannie Hillsmith =

American painter

- Hillsmith in 1940
- Born: 1911; Boston, Massachusetts
- Died: July 27, 2007; Jaffrey, New Hampshire
- Known for: Cubism, painting
- Spouse: Gordon Welchman (1958–1970)

Fannie Hillsmith (1911 – July 27, 2007) was an American cubist painter from Boston who during a long career, mostly based in New York City, developed a style of Cubism which combined traditional Cubist motifs with what she called "an early American feeling."

== Personal life ==
Fannie Hillsmith was born in Boston, Massachusetts in 1911. Her grandfather, Frank Hill Smith, was a painter, as well as one of the founders of the Boston Museum School. Hillsmith began sketching at an early age. She enrolled in the Boston Museum School in 1930, and graduated four years later.

Hillsmith married Gordon Welchman in 1958. Welchman was an American-English mathematician who worked at Bletchley Park and worked on code-breaking alongside Alan Turing. The couple met while Hillsmith was on a one-year scholarship from the Boston Museum of Art to study in Europe. The couple divorced in 1970.

== Career ==
Hillsmith moved from Boston to New York City in 1934. Once in New York, she took an interest in avant-garde art through her studies and gradually developed an abstract style. Hillsmith studied under such teachers as William Zorach and Yasuo Kuniyoshi for one year while at the Art Students League. She went on to study at New York University at the A. E. Gallatin Collection.

Fannie Hillsmith held her first art show in New York at the Norlyst Gallery, owned by Jimmy Ernst, in 1943. Her work was included in Abstract and Surrealist Art in America by Sidney Janis, published in 1944.

Hillsmith displayed her work in three shows at the Art of This Century Gallery in Manhattan, which was owned by Peggy Guggenheim. In 1953, she exhibited Interior in Tan in the show Nine Women Painters at Bennington College. She also exhibited at a series of shows at the Peridot Gallery and the Charles Egan Gallery during the 1950s and 1960s.

Hillsmith began working at Atelier 17, which was an intaglio printmaking workshop owned by Stanley William Hayter, in 1946. She worked at Aterlier alongside noted artists such as Yves Tanguy, Miró and Jacques Lipchitz. She became very close friends with Harriet Berger Nurkse and Alicia Legg. Hillsmith also taught briefly at Black Mountain College, located in Asheville, North Carolina.

Her most famous painting was the Molasses Jug, an oil painting completed in 1949. The artwork is held by the Flint Institute of Art. Another notable piece is The Table–Study No. 5, painted in 1947.

Fannie Hillsmith actively painted Cubist art for nearly sixty years. She had been represented by an art gallery in Manhattan's SoHo neighborhood since 1990. She continued painting every day until January 2007.

Hillsmith died in her sleep at her home in Jaffrey, New Hampshire on July 27, 2007.

== Artist style ==
Hillmsith's style of Cubism combined traditional Cubist motifs with what she called "an early American feeling." She was influenced by such painters as Picasso, Gris and Miró, according to The New York Times.

She is quoted as saying, "I am interested in abstract art, but I am also interested in the message—the problem is to convey feeling with the impact of the abstract."
