= Amos Fortune, Free Man =

1950 novel by Elizabeth Yates

- Original cover illustration
- Author: Elizabeth Yates
- Illustrator: Nora Spicer Unwin
- Cover artist: hannah ghilarducci
- Language: English
- Genre: Children's novel
- Publisher: E. P. Dutton, New York
- Publication date: 1950
- Publication place: United States
- Media type: Print (hardback & paperback)
- Pages: 181
- ISBN: 0-14-034158-7
- OCLC: 19265732
- Dewey Decimal: 974.4/00496073024 B 92 19
- LC Class: E185.97.F73 Y3 1989

Amos Fortune, Free Man is a biographical novel by Elizabeth Yates that won the Newbery Medal for excellence in American children's literature in 1951. It is about a young African prince who is captured and taken to America as a slave. He masters a trade, purchases his freedom and dies free in Jaffrey, New Hampshire, in 1801.

At-mun-shi, a young prince of a tribe in southern Africa, was born free in 1710. He lives a peaceful life until a raid on their village by slavers kills his father, the chief. At-mun is kidnapped, transported to America via the White Falcon (a slave ship), and sold in New England. Now called 'Amos', he is sold to a man named Caleb Copeland, and though the Copeland family do not treat him badly he rejects his slave status and determines to earn his freedom. He comes to an arrangement with Copeland, but when Caleb dies in debt the arrangement is disregarded, and so Amos Fortune is sold again to a man named Ichabod Richardson. Richardson teaches Amos about tanning, and he becomes a skilled worker. He is now about thirty. Amos works for Richardson for four years, then buys his freedom. He marries a woman named Lily, whose freedom he also buys; but she dies a year later. Amos is sad that she died, yet happy she died a free woman. Later he marries another African woman named Lydia, and it takes three more years to save up her freedom price. Lydia dies a year later. Again, Amos is sad she died but happy that she died free. He marries a younger woman named Violet, and he buys freedom for her daughter too. Amos moves to Jaffrey, New Hampshire to start his own tanning business there, and does so despite opposition. Eventually Amos saves up enough money that he buys his own land and he builds a house and a barn.

At one point Amos becomes very angry with his wife, who has taken money from him. He climbs Mt. Monadnock and does not leave until he gets an answer from God. Eventually he receives his answer and climbs back down, then forgives his wife as she is sorry for stealing his money. She had done it to keep him from helping a woman named Lois who needed help to keep her children from being taken away. She was lazy and would not support her children, but Amos had pity on her. He decides against helping her and keeps the money. Amos goes to buy the land that he has always wanted. They buy the land and they build a house before winter. They also build a place where Amos can work as a tanner. At this point in his life, he is 80 years old.

== The real Amos Fortune ==
Amos Fortune (c. 1710–1801) was born in Africa, sold into slavery and eventually freed at the age of 60. Fortune worked hard to develop his tannery in the town of Jaffrey, New Hampshire, and became a valued member of the community there. Peter Lambert's booklet Amos Fortune: The Man and His Legacy distinguishes the known historical facts from the dramatic events of the novel.

Awards
Preceded by The Door in the Wall	Newbery Medal recipient 1951	Succeeded by Ginger Pye
Preceded by (none)	Winner of the William Allen White Children's Book Award; 1953	Succeeded by Little Vic
