= Daniel Bateman Cutter =

American physician (1808–1889)

Member of the New Hampshire General Court
- In office 1852–1853

Personal details
- Born: May 10, 1808 Jaffrey, New Hampshire, U.S.
- Died: December 7, 1889 (aged 81) Peterborough, New Hampshire, U.S.
- Spouse(s): Clementina Parker (m. 1835–1870) Tryphena Tufts Richardson (m. 1872)
- Children: 2
- Education: Dartmouth College (MA); Yale School of Medicine (MD)
- Occupation: Politician; physician

Daniel Bateman Cutter (May 10, 1808 – December 7, 1889) was an American politician and medical doctor from New Hampshire.

== Early life ==
Daniel Bateman Cutter was born on May 10, 1808, in Jaffrey, New Hampshire, as the eldest child of Sally (née Jones) and Daniel Cutter. He graduated from Kimball Union Academy in 1829. He graduated from Dartmouth College in 1833 with a Master of Arts. He studied medicine with Luke Howe of Jaffrey and under his uncle Nemehiah Cutter of Pepperell, Massachusetts. He then graduated from Yale School of Medicine with a Doctor of Medicine in 1835.

== Career ==
Cutter practiced medicine in Ashby, Massachusetts, until 1837. He then practiced medicine for the rest of his life in Peterborough, New Hampshire.

Cutter served in the New Hampshire General Court in 1852. He also served in the 1852 New Hampshire Constitutional Convention. He also served as superintendent of schools. He helped organize and was a manager of the Peterborough Savings Bank. In 1881, he published the History of Jaffrey about his hometown.

== Personal life ==
Cutter married Clementina Parker, daughter of Asa Parker, of Jaffrey on December 8, 1835. They had two daughters. His wife died in August 28, 1870. He married Tryphena (née Tufts) Richardson on December 5, 1872.

Cutter died of kidney disease on December 7, 1889, in Peterborough.
