= Clarence Sumner Luce =

American architect (1852–1924)

- Born: June 10, 1852; Chicopee, Massachusetts
- Died: March 22, 1924 (aged 71); Emerson Hill, Staten Island, New York
- Occupation: Architect
- Spouse: Alice Louise Francis (married November 16, 1875)
- Parent(s): Augustus and Clarissa Elvira (Clapp) Luce
- Buildings: Opera House, Holyoke, Massachusetts

Clarence Sumner Luce (1852–1924) was an American architect who practiced first in Boston, then at Newport, Rhode Island, and finally in New York. He is best known for his design for the Holyoke Opera House, and his designs for a series of Newport houses.

== Early life ==
Clarence Luce was born at Chicopee, Massachusetts on June 10, 1852, the son of Augustus Luce and his wife, Clarissa Elvira Clapp. As of 1855, the family lived at Haydenville, Williamsburg, Massachusetts, where Augustus Luce worked as a "brass moulder" in the mill of the Haydenville Manufacturing Co. By 1870, Augustus Luce was a superintendent of the mill, living next door to the Greek Revival mansion of the mill's owner, Josiah Hayden. In 1874, a flood destroyed the mill, but the Hayden family rebuilt it the following year to a design by Clarence Luce.

== Career ==
Luce attended the Williston Seminary in Easthampton, Massachusetts for four years, where he enrolled in the "scientific course" of study. In 1870, he moved to Boston to apprentice with the architect Gridley J.F. Bryant, and became, for a brief time, Bryant's partner. At the same time, Luce took courses at the Lowell Institute and attended lectures on architecture at Harvard University.

Luce worked for Bryant until 1874, when he established his own practice at 17 Pembroke Square (where he worked from 1875 to 1877). Having cultivated a thriving practice designing houses at Newport, Rhode Island, Luce relocated there in 1882, remaining until 1885 when he moved to New York. Luce died at his home on Staten Island, New York on March 22, 1924.

== Architectural works ==
- Wistariahurst, Holyoke, Massachusetts (completed 1874, reconstruction after move from Williamsburg)
- Whiting Building and Holyoke Opera House, Holyoke, Massachusetts (completed 1878; destroyed by fire 1967).
- Charles Whitney Residence, 181 Commonwealth Avenue, Boston, Massachusetts (completed 1878).
- Edward Stanwood House, High Street, Brookline, Massachusetts (completed 1879).
- Admiral Werden House, 68 Ayrault Street, Newport, Rhode Island (completed 1881).
- Letitia B. Sargent House, Aufenthalt, 80 Kay Street, Newport, Rhode Island (completed 1881).
- Mary and Anne Stevens House, 73 Rhode Island Avenue, Newport, Rhode Island (completed 1881).
- Pel-Bull-Cottrell House, 11 Francis Street, Newport, Rhode Island (completed 1881).
- Walter H. Wesson House, 302 Maple Street, Springfield, Massachusetts (completed 1882; destroyed by fire in 1982).
- Thomas R. Hunter House, Tower Top, 77 Rhode Island Avenue, Newport, Rhode Island (completed 1882).
- E.G. Wilde House, 75 Kay Street, Newport, Rhode Island (completed 1883).
- Augustus Jay House, Oakwold, 65 Old Beach Road, Newport, Rhode Island (completed 1883).
- Lyman C. Josephs House, Louisiana, 438 Wolcott Avenue, Middletown, Rhode Island (completed 1883).
- Dr. John G. Mason House, Gibbs Avenue at Catherine Street, Newport, Rhode Island (completed 1883; demolished).
- Gen. James H. Van Alen House, The Grange, Lawrence Avenue, Newport, Rhode Island (completed 1883; demolished 1888).
- Charlotte Noyes House, 15 Francis Street, Newport, Rhode Island (completed 1884).
- Rev. Henry A. Coit House, 208 Indian Avenue, Middletown, Rhode Island (completed 1887).
- Renaissance Hotel, Fifth Avenue, New York (completed 1891).
- Neoclassical houses, 203–211 West 138th Street, Manhattan, New York (completed in 1893 with Bruce Price).
- Somerset Hotel, West 47th Street, New York (completed 1901).
- New York State Building, Louisiana Purchase Exhibition, St. Louis, MO (1903).
- Coindre Hall, Huntington, New York (completed 1911).

== Gallery ==
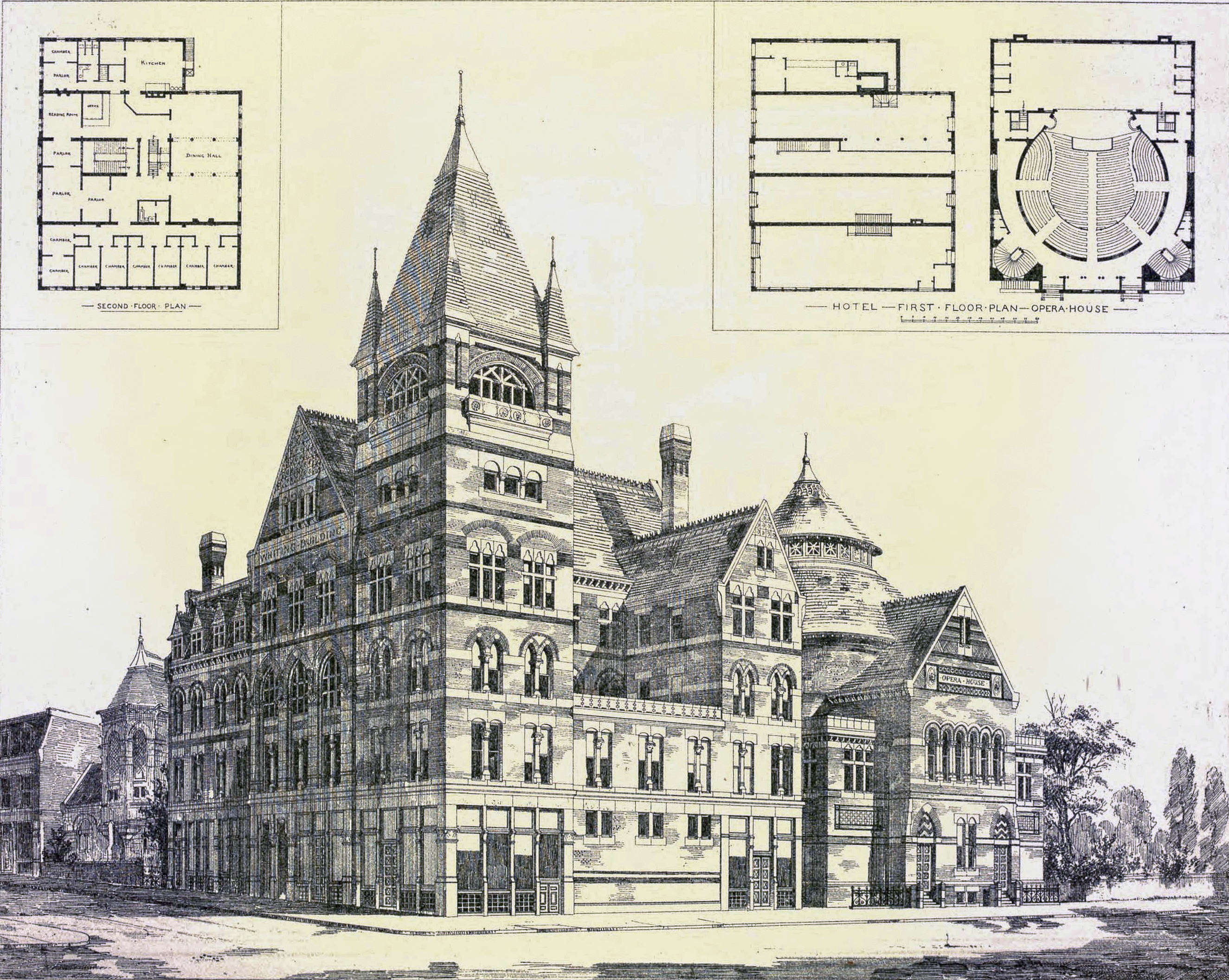
Whiting Building and Opera House, Holyoke, Massachusetts.

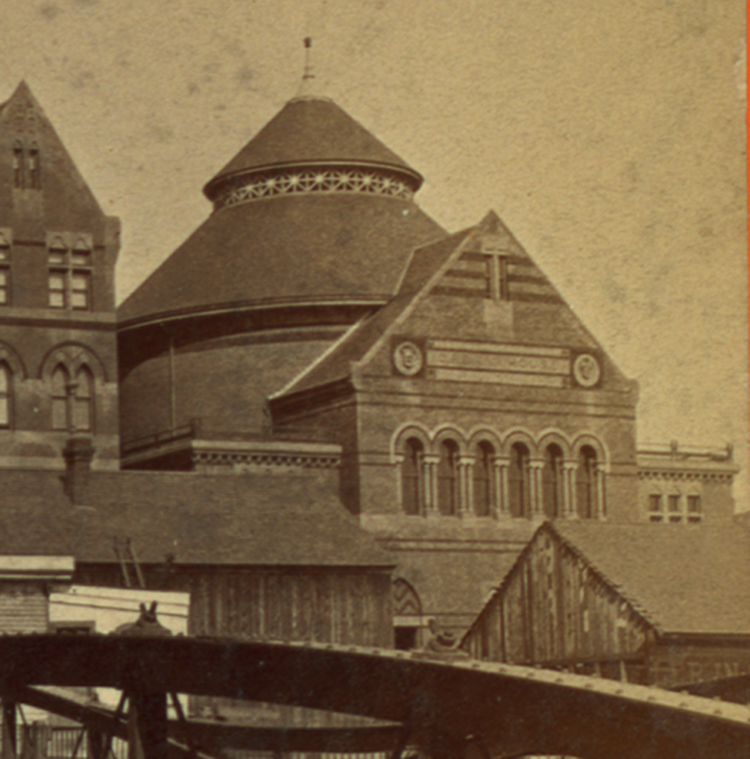
Holyoke Opera House, completed in 1878; destroyed by fire in 1967.

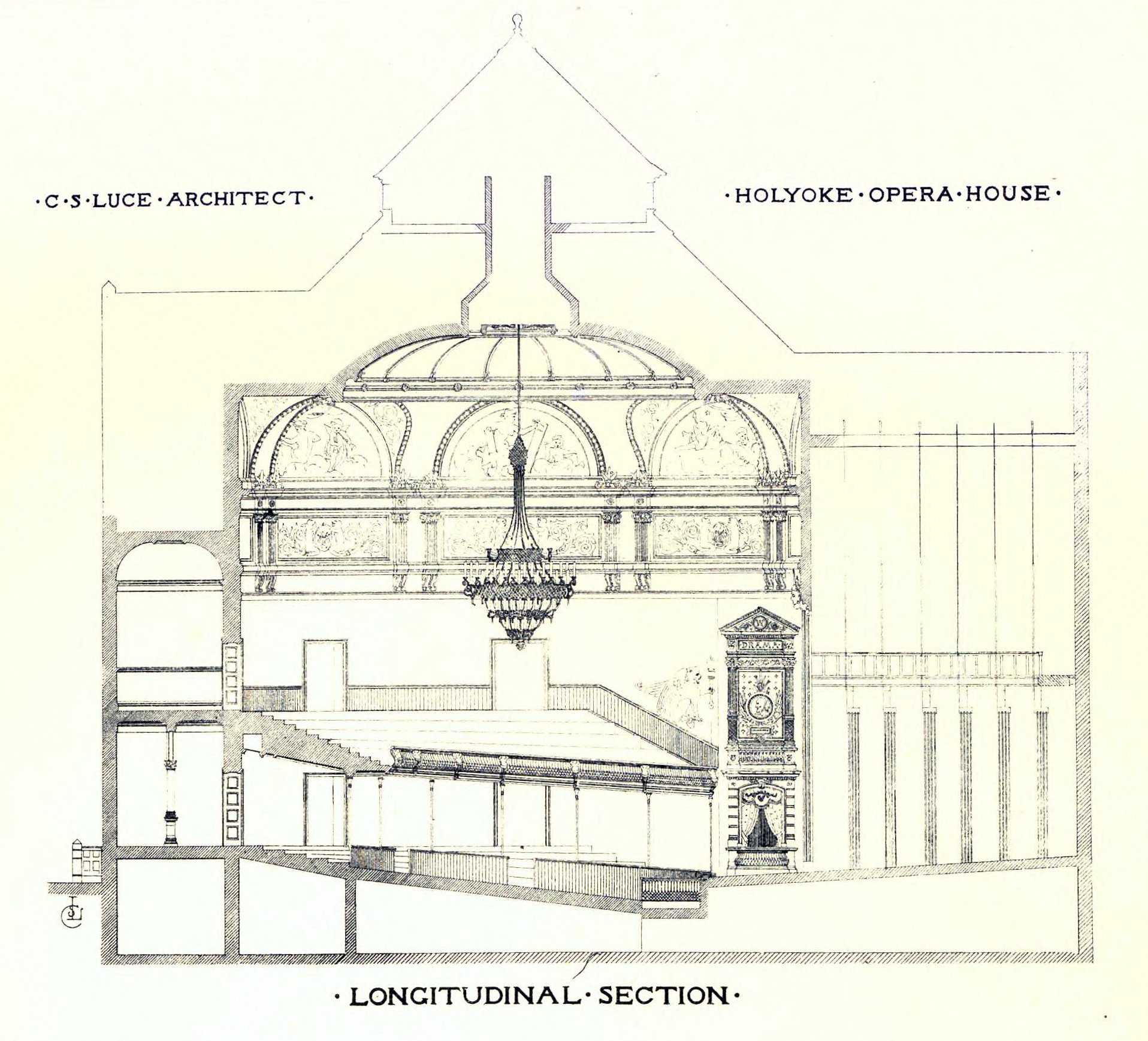
Cross-section of the Holyoke Opera House, drawn by Clarence Luce.

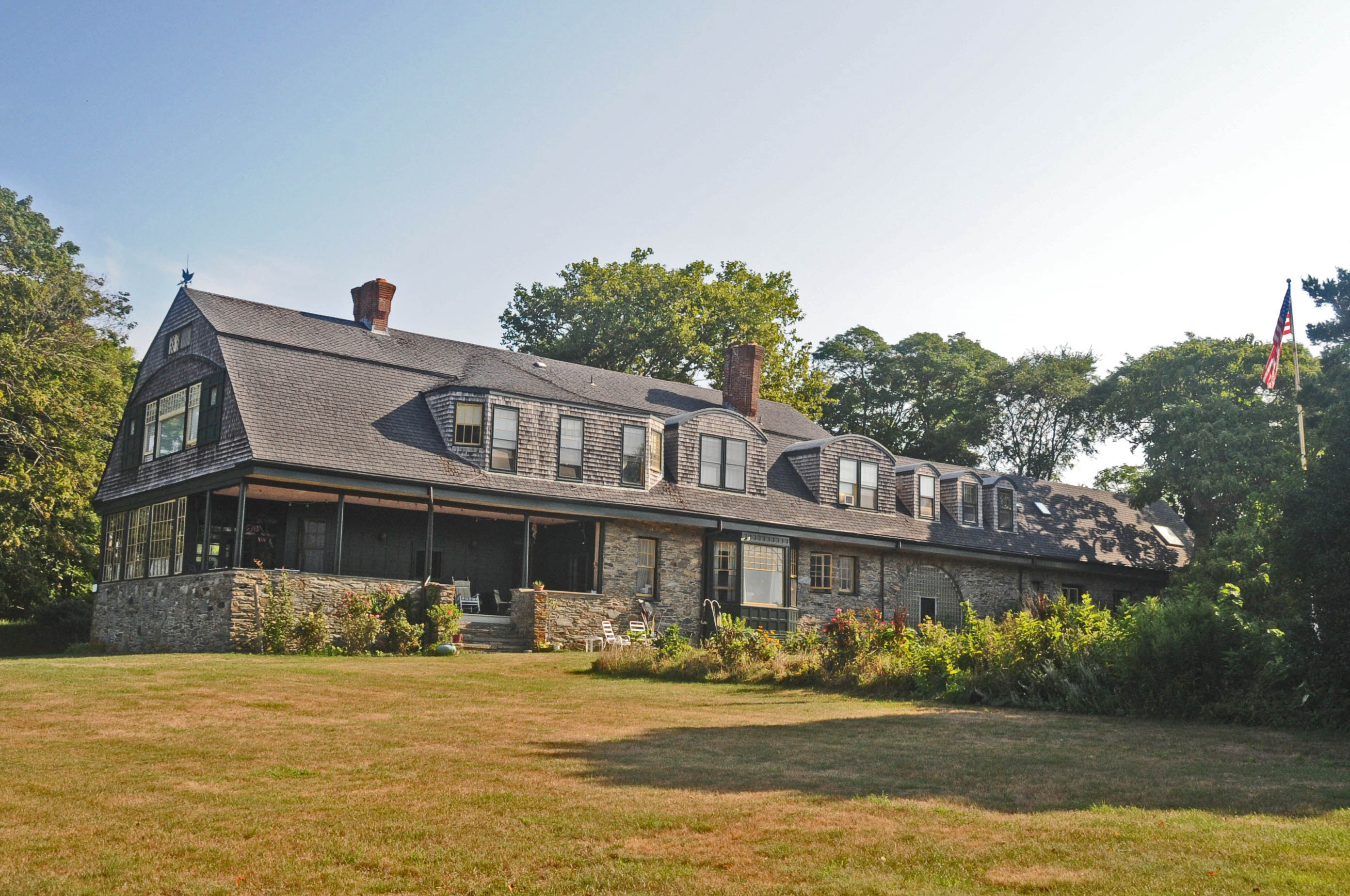
The Lyman C. Josephs House, Middletown, Rhode Island, completed in 1883.

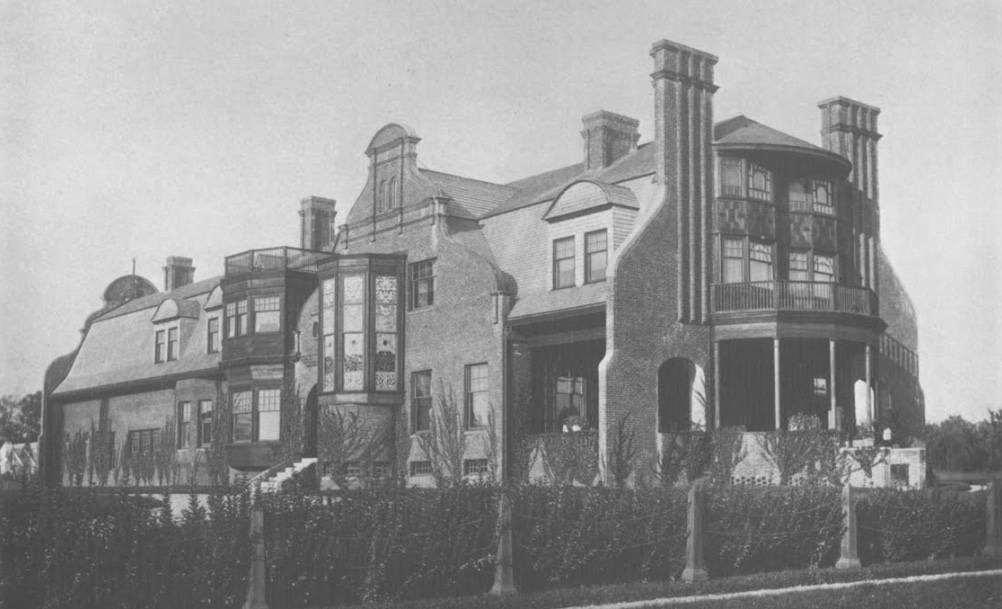
General James H. Van Alen House, "The Grange," completed in 1883; demolished in 1888.

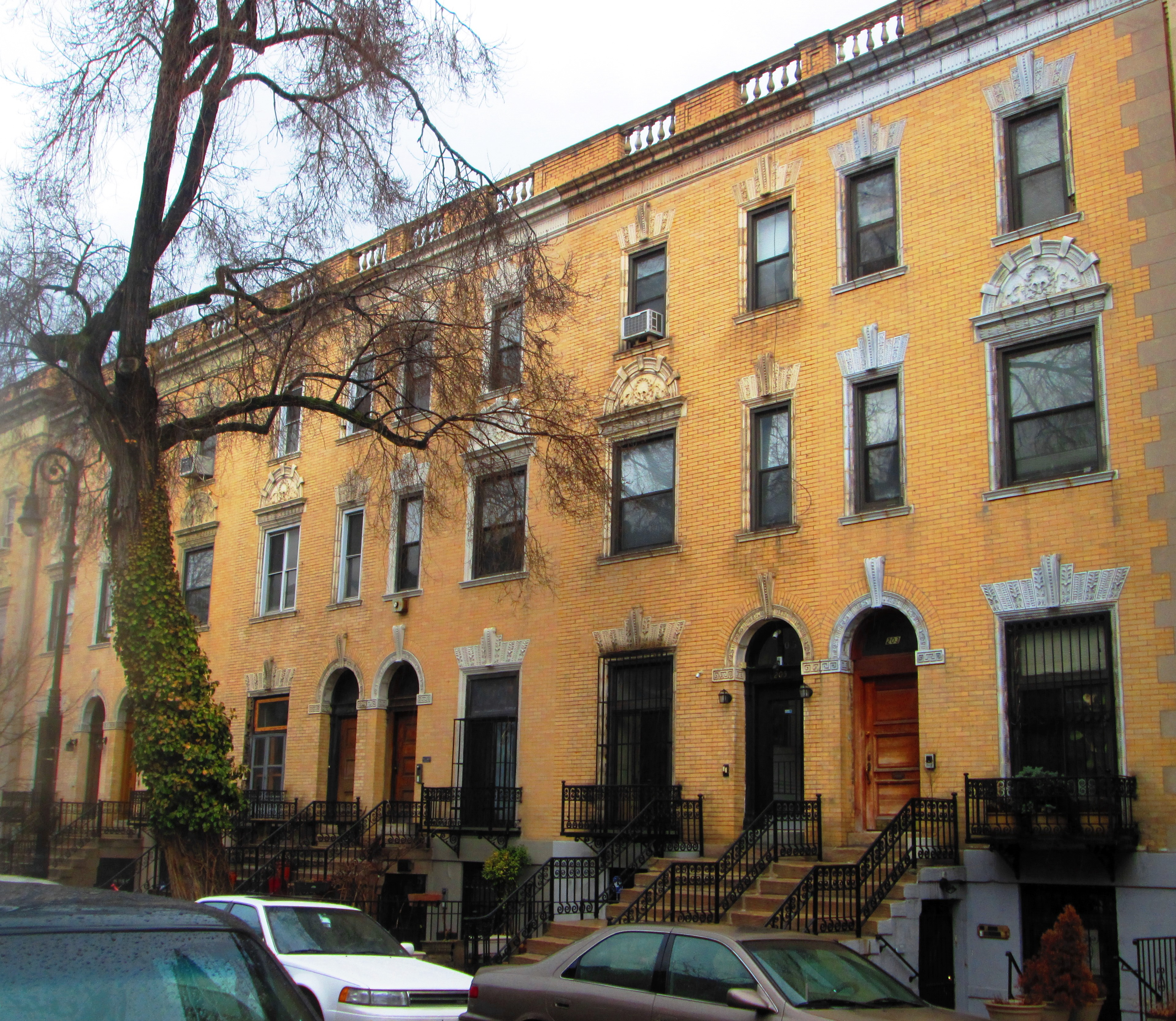
Neoclassical houses, 203–211 West 138th Street, Manhattan, New York, completed in 1893 (with Bruce Price).

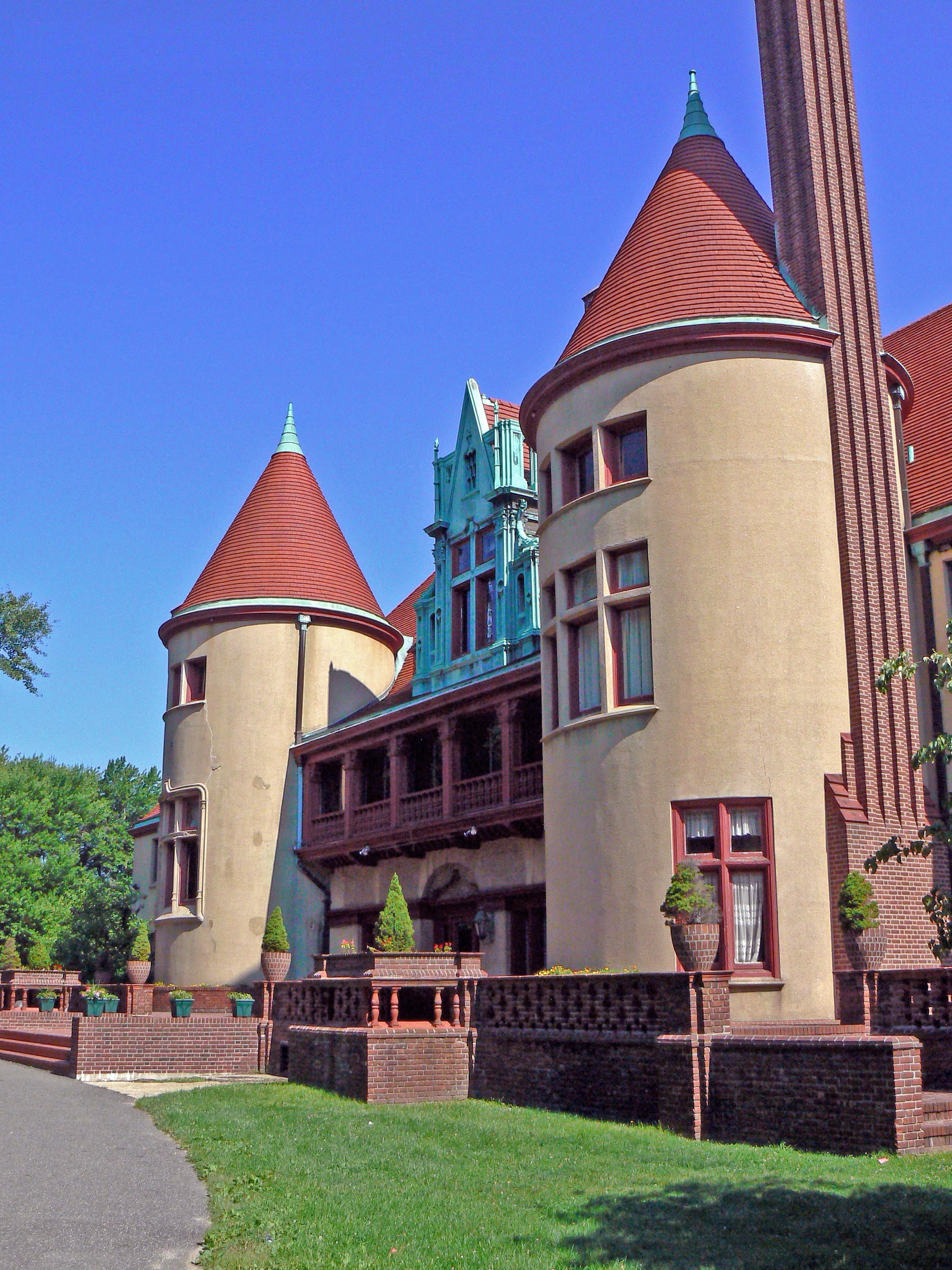
Coindre Hall, completed in 1912.
