= Holyoke Opera House =

Theatre built in 1877 in Holyoke, Massachusetts

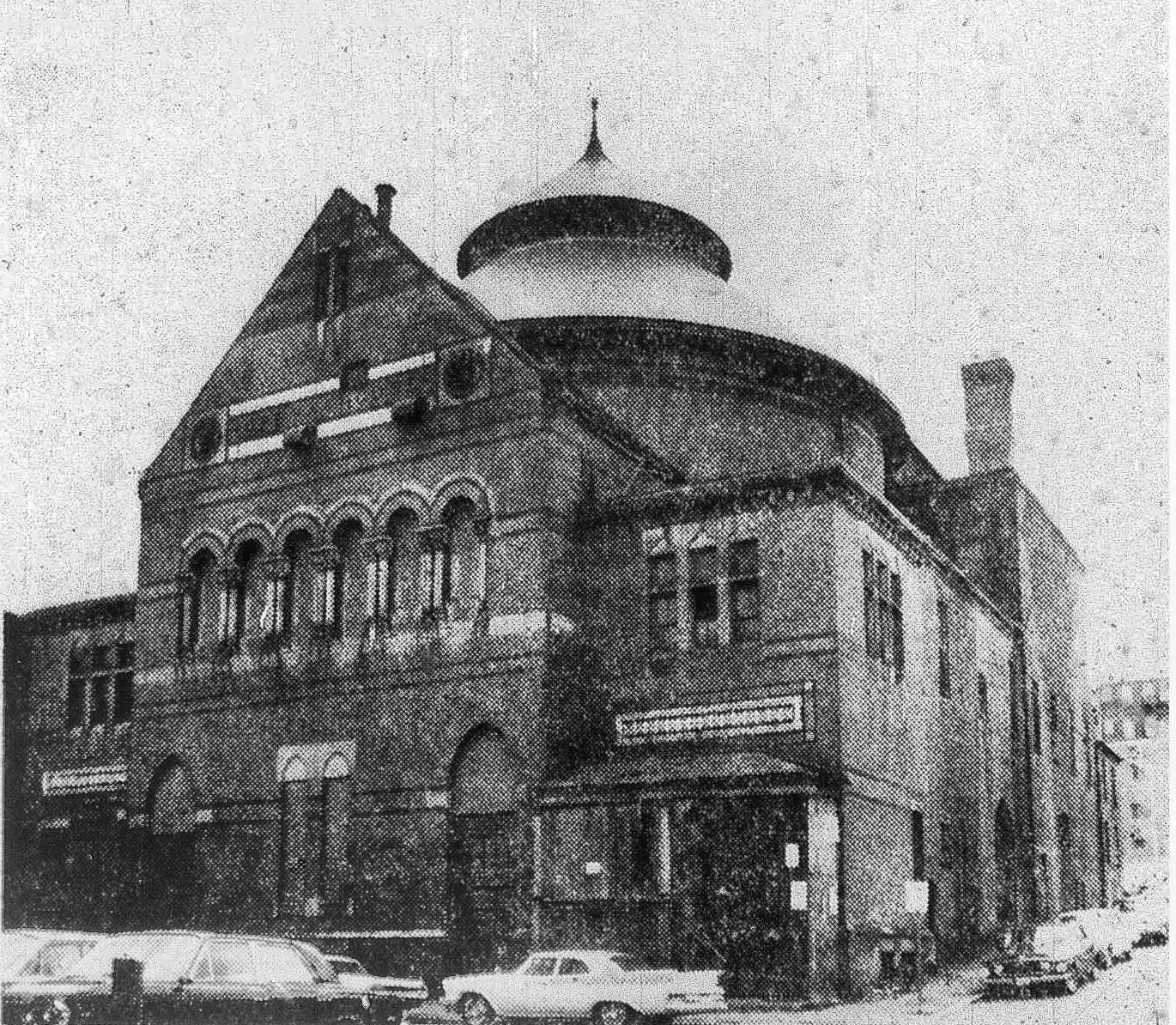
- Holyoke Opera House as it appeared abandoned in May 1967
- Interactive map of Holyoke Opera House
- Former names: Whiting Opera House; The Holyoke Theatre (Note: Operated by "The Holyoke Theatre, Inc." from 1937 to 1945); E. M. Loew's State Theatre (Note: Operated by E. M. Loew's as the Loew's State Theatre from 1945 to 1955); The State
- Location: Holyoke, Massachusetts
- Coordinates: 42°12′24.152″N 72°36′20.336″W
- Capacity: 1050-1375

Construction
- Built: 1877
- Opened: March 25, 1878
- Renovated: 1894
- Closed: 1955
- Demolished: 1967
- Architects: Clarence Sumner Luce; J. B. McElfatrick & Sons (Note: Redesigned galleries, boxes, and stage in 1893–1894.)
- Builder: William Whiting II
- General contractor: Casper Ranger

The Holyoke Opera House was a theatre operating in Holyoke, Massachusetts during the 19th and early 20th centuries. Built in 1877, and christened on March 25, 1878, the theater was built by then-mayor William Whiting who privately funded its construction along with the adjoining "Windsor House" hotel. Designed by architect Clarence Sumner Luce, its interior was decorated by painter and designer Frank Hill Smith, who is best known today for the frescoes in the House of Representatives' chamber in the Massachusetts State House, and whose commission for the venue's main hall paintings has been described by the American Art Directory and historian John Tauranac as one of his definitive works.

Its opening show was a performance of Louie XI starring John W. Albaugh. In its first decades it was among the largest theaters in the country, and gained a number of notable acts. In later decades it became a vaudeville and burlesque establishment. Following the introduction of moving pictures, the opera house saw a steady decline and by the time the venue was purchased by E. M. Loew in 1945, The Film Daily described it as a "once-famous theater". On October 29, 1967, the venue was destroyed in a multiple-alarm fire, with such damage that officials could not determine its cause.

== Design ==
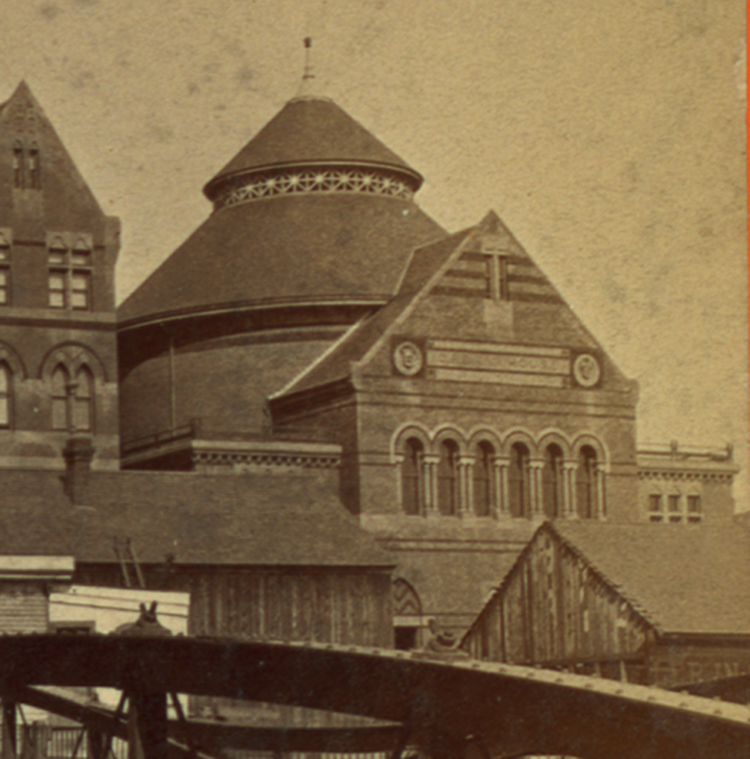
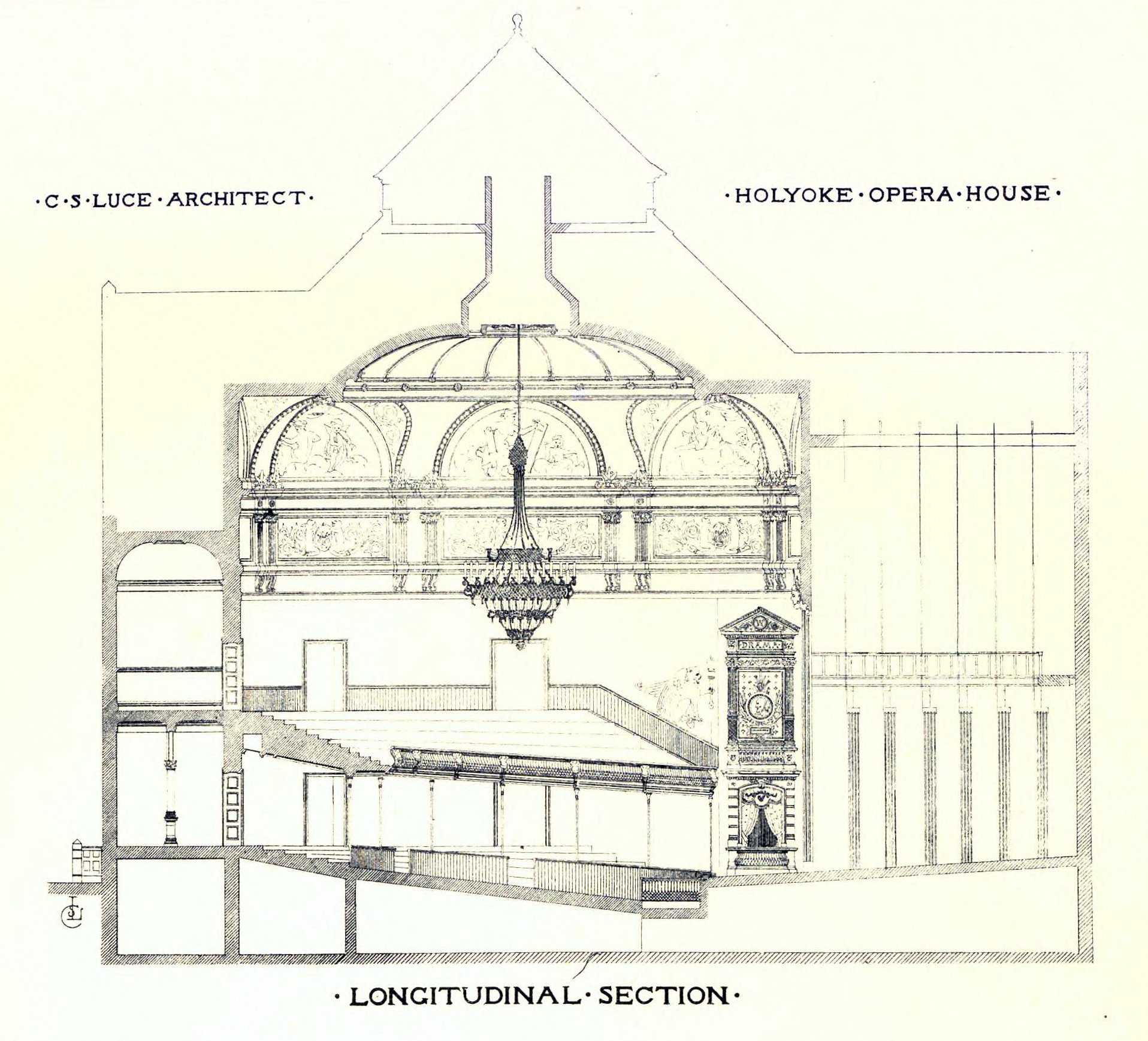
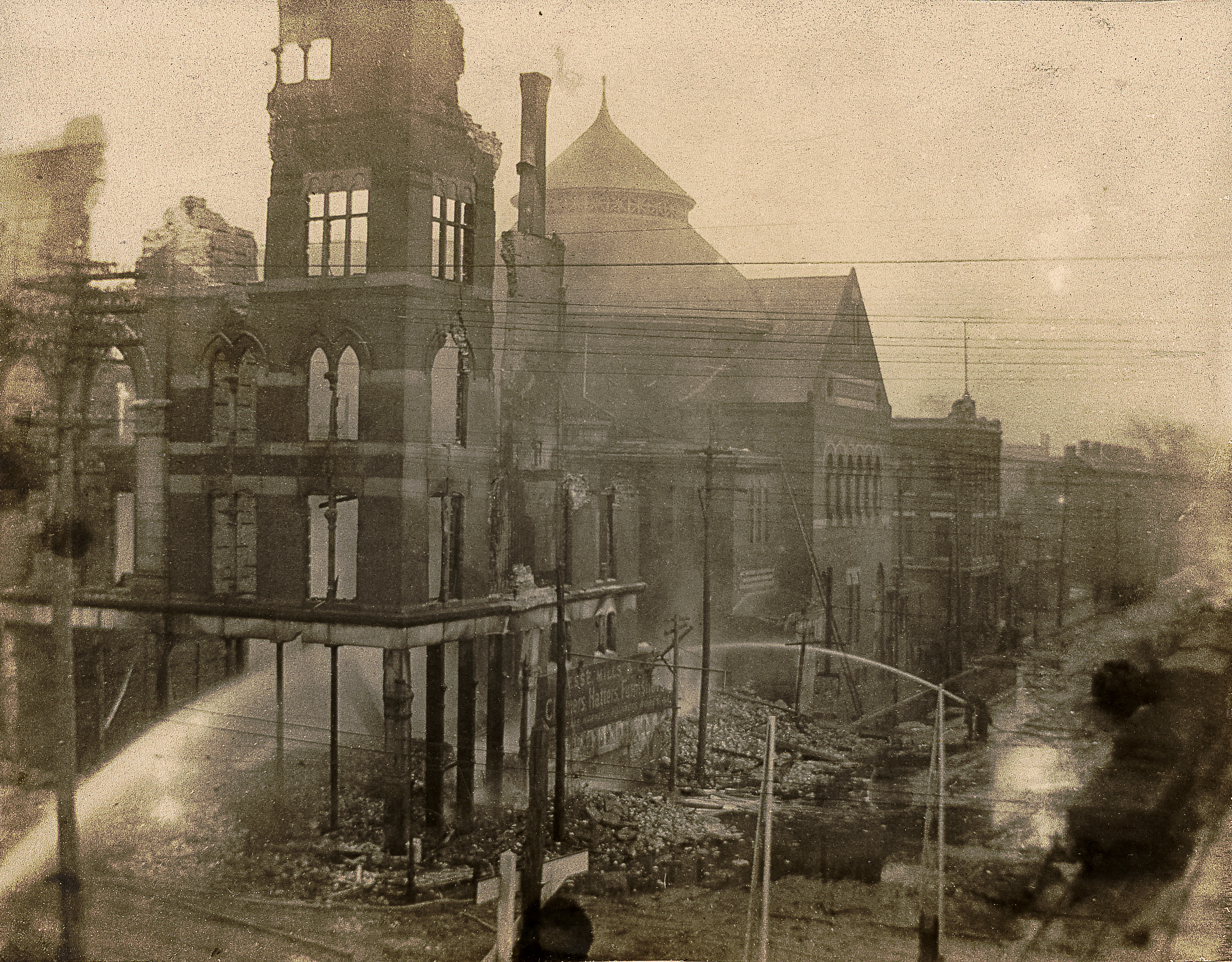
The Opera House, sometime before its companion structure, the Windsor Hotel, burned in 1899; longitudinal section of the theater, showing its interior as it appeared from 1878–1894, prior to the addition of 10 boxes and a second gallery; the Opera House in the immediate aftermath of the Windsor Hotel fire, March 1, 1899

=== Exterior ===
Constructed by Casper Ranger, the exterior was described as being made of contrasting light Philadelphia and dark Holyoke pressed bricks with bands and accents done in black brick. At the front gable were panels done in Victorian majolica of sock and buskin on opposite sides of the building's "Opera House" nameplate.

The opera house, originally being a part of the Windsor House Hotel, was previously attached by a small wooden hallway until that building caught fire on March 1, 1899, taking out most other buildings in that block as firefighters fought late into the night. (Note: Not to be confused with the "Windsor Hotel" in New York City which burned within 2 weeks of Holyoke's.)

=== Interior ===
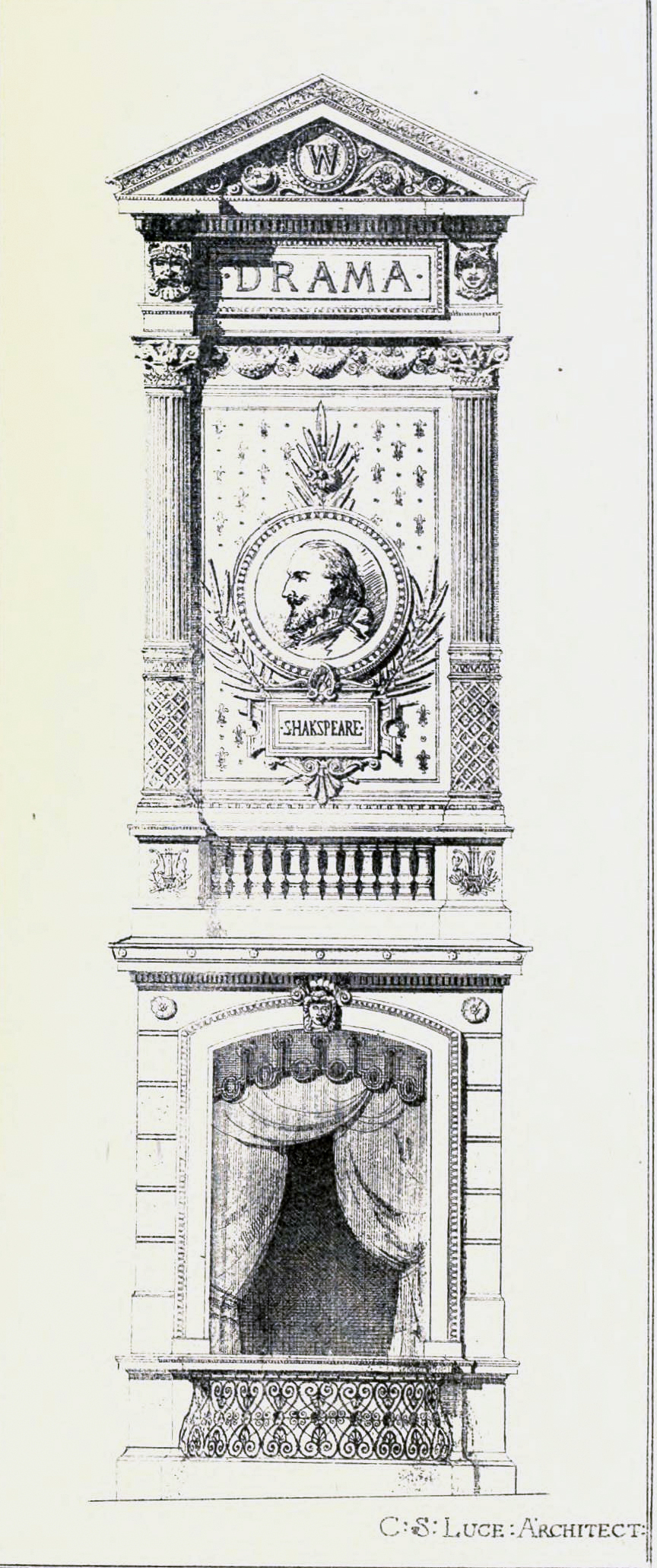
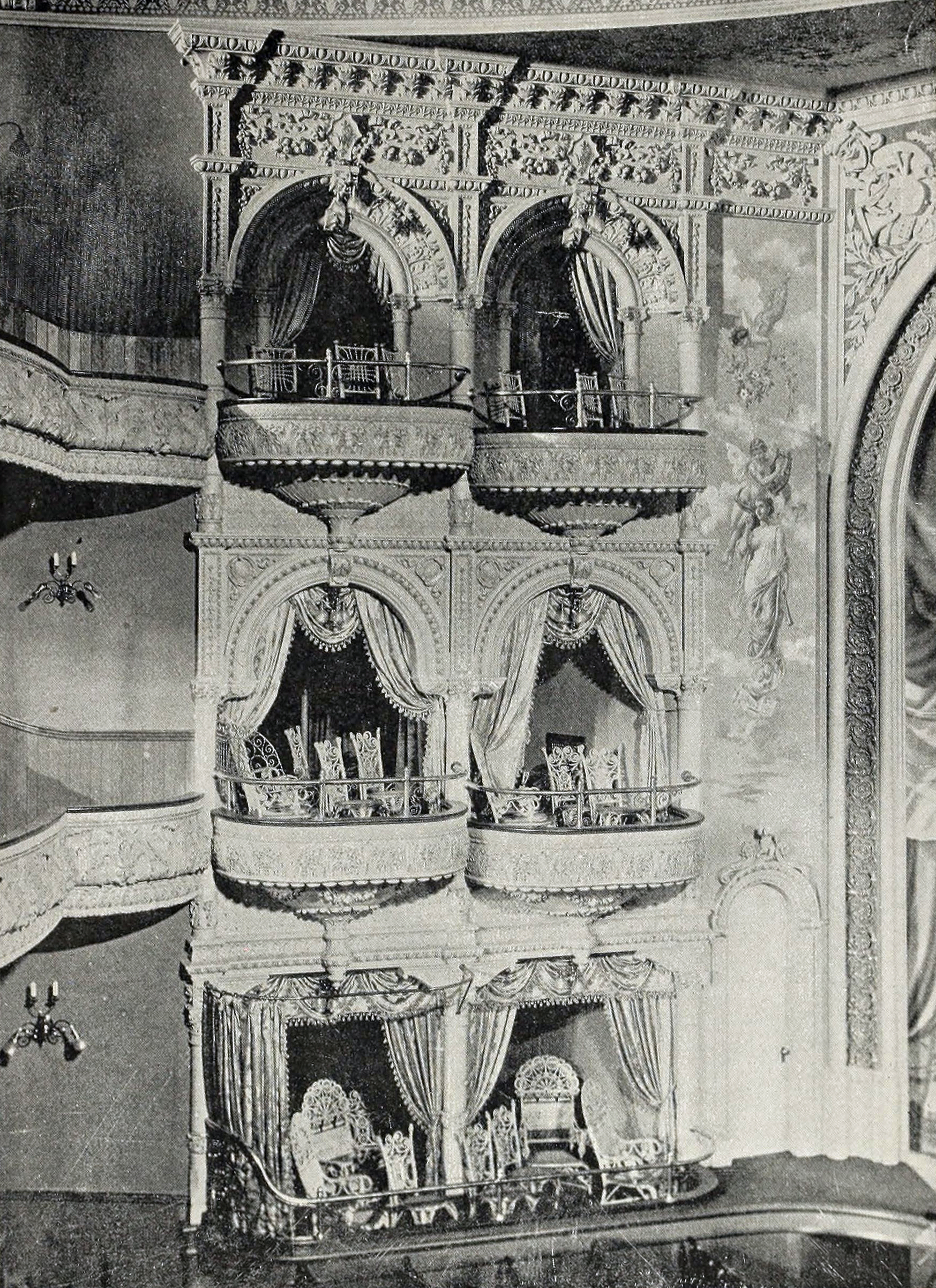
Details of the original stage-right box (left), and the six which replaced it (right) during the reconstruction and expansion of the auditorium in 1894

The interior of the theater was originally described as being decorated in a Neo-Grec style, with the auditorium's first floor containing a parterre, orchestra pit, and one gallery. The ceiling was described as having large ornate cornices with 8 lunettes forming vaults, each ornately decorated with muses and cherubs by Frank Hill Smith, leading up into a shallower gadrooned flat dome with a rosace-shaped grate which served as the ventilation for the theater, with a large brass chandelier hanging from its center. Much of the ornamental work, such as capitals, was executed in papier-mâché.

A large renovation and reconstruction of the auditorium gallery was undertaken between May and September of 1894, with a rededication on September 22, 1894, featuring a performance by Alessandro Salvini, and attended by Governor William Russell. The opera house was effectively rechristened as renovations removed almost entirely all of the building's original elements from the dome's cornice downward, including the aforementioned papier-mâché features, which were replaced by stucco designed and constructed by the Architectural Decorative Company in Boston. The gallery was razed and replaced by 2, and the theater was described as the 2nd largest in New England at that time in capacity. The stage was described as having an archway 30 feet high and 37 feet wide, with red, green, and white globes alternating in 5 rows of border lights, and one of footer lights, each row having 88 respective lights, both gas and electric. A new custom-made chandelier was added, with 120 jets for gas lighting and 120 globes for lightbulbs. Paintings of muses and cherubs were added, one to each side of the proscenium, it is unknown whether these were done by F. H. Smith, however his original paintings on the dome are referred to in one 1894 report as "the only points in which the new house resembles the old one".

== Notable performances ==
=== Music ===
The opera house would serve as a venue for a number of notable performers, including singer-entertainer Eva Tanguay, who was first promoted there as a child actress by local theater manager Paul C. Winkelmann in the 1880s, and returned to the venue years later after establishing herself as a household name.

=== Plays ===
Noted performers included John W. Albaugh playing his best-known titular role in Louis XI at the theater's opening show on March 26, 1878. Numerous plays were performed at the Opera House during the first several decades of its existence, it was one of the venues where William Gillette premiered his 1894 comedy Too Much Johnson.

=== Films ===
Among the early films seen at the venue were those by Lyman H. Howe, which appeared for several seasons in the early 1900s. L. Frank Baum, the creator of The Wizard of Oz also shared the big screen of the Holyoke once it became a cinema in 1922.

=== Lectures ===
On three occasions, the orator Robert G. Ingersoll would deliver addresses on the Opera House stage, in the years 1880, 1885, and 1894, on the subjects "How to be Saved?", "Which Way?", and Shakespeare respectively.

== See also ==
- Victory Theater, the sole remaining historical theater building in the city
- Valley Arena Gardens, another defunct Holyoke venue, primarily used for boxing with some shows and entertainment, of a similar architectural style
