= Jaffrey Center Historic District =

Historic district in New Hampshire, United States

- U.S. National Register of Historic Places
- U.S. Historic district
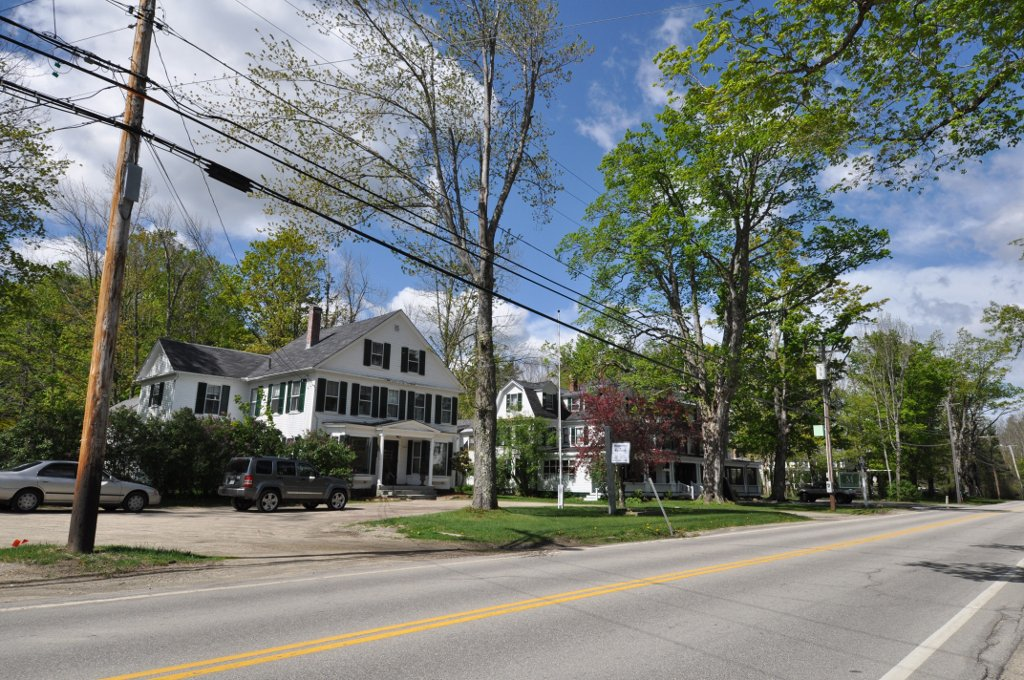
- The Monadnock Inn

- Location within New Hampshire Location within the United States
- Location: NH 124, Jaffrey, New Hampshire
- Coordinates: 42°49′38″N 72°3′13″W
- Area: 38 acres (15 ha)
- Architect: Multiple
- Architectural style: Federal, Colonial, Greek Revival
- NRHP reference No.: 75000122
- Added to NRHP: June 11, 1975

The Jaffrey Center Historic District encompasses the traditional civic heart of the small town of Jaffrey, New Hampshire. The district lies to the west of the Jaffrey's main business district, extending along Main Street (New Hampshire Route 124) from Harkness Road to the Jaffrey Common, and along Thorndike Pond Road northward from Main Street. It includes the town's oldest civic buildings, and was its main center until the mills of East Jaffrey eclipsed it. The district was listed on the National Register of Historic Places in 1975.

== Description and history ==
The district retains the feel of an 18th-19th century rural village, and includes elements dating to shortly after the town's incorporation in 1773. The old burying ground was established in 1774, and the old meeting house (now a cultural center) was raised in 1775. The district includes 19th century school houses, and houses that were built in the 18th and 19th centuries, in predominantly Georgian, Federal, and Greek Revival styles. One of the town's early industries is also represented, in the remnants of a tannery established c. 1810 at the east end of the district.

The area's importance as an economic as well as civic center arose after completion of the Third New Hampshire Turnpike (now NH 124). The turnpike brought travelers, who stopped at inns and taverns in the center, and goods, which were sold to local farmers. Melville Academy, a secondary school, was founded in 1832, and its 1833 building is now a local museum. The area remained of some significance even as East Jaffrey's mills became more prominent, as it catered in the late 19th century to vacationers drawn to nearby Mount Monadnock.

== See also ==
- National Register of Historic Places listings in Cheshire County, New Hampshire
