= Victory Theater =

Victory Theatre
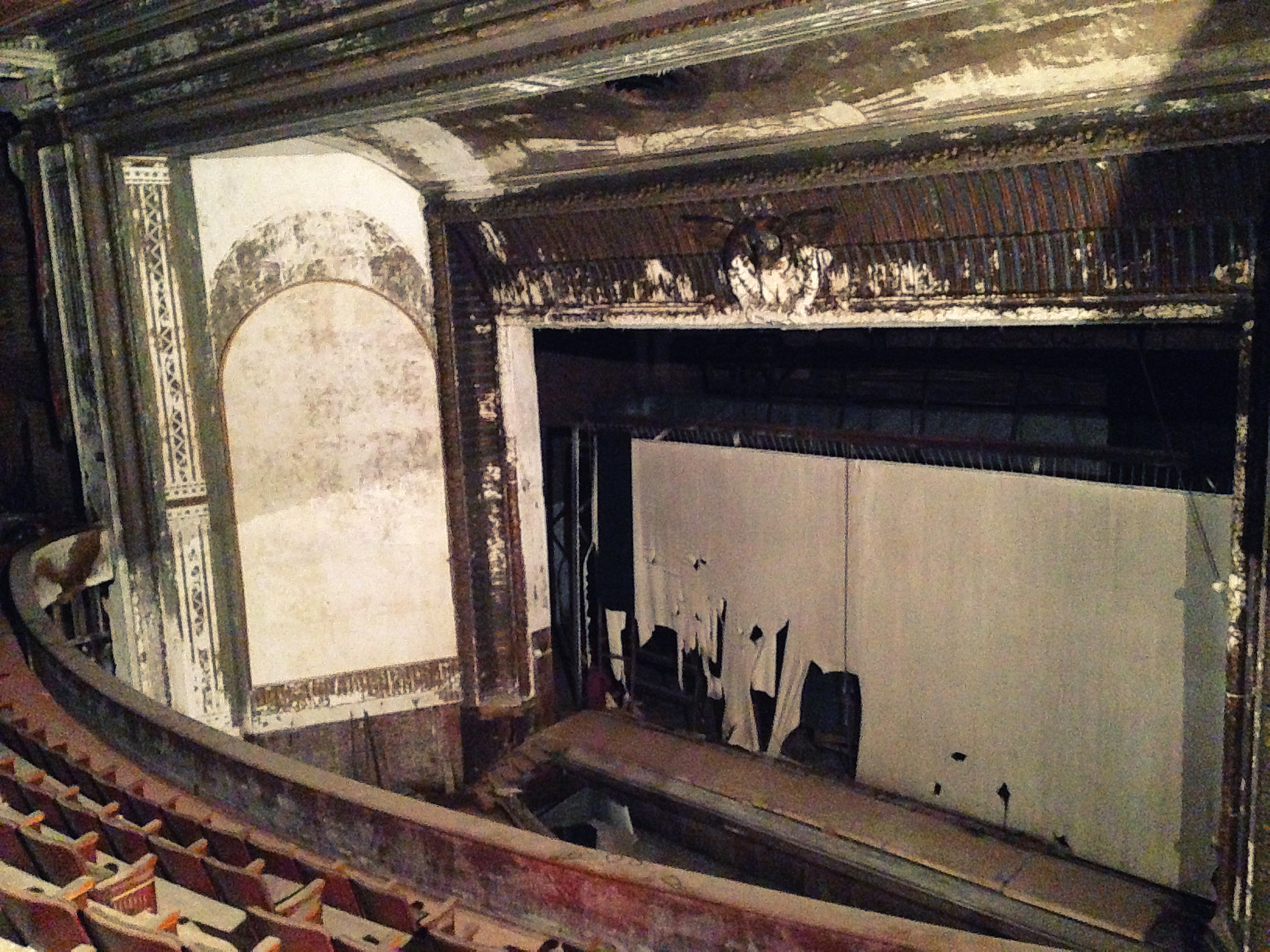
- Stage of the Victory Theater, 2018
- Interactive map of Victory Theatre
- Address: 81–89 Suffolk Street; Holyoke; United States
- Coordinates: 42°12′25″N 72°36′36″W
- Owner: Massachusetts International Festival of the Arts
- Capacity: 1,680
- Type: Performing Arts Center

Construction
- Opened: 1920
- Closed: 1979
- Years active: 1920–1979
- Architects: William Luther Mowll, Roger Glade Rand
- Builder: Goldstein Brothers Amusement Company

Website
- www.mifafestival.org/

The Victory Theatre (in stone on building, spelled "re") is a theater in Holyoke, Massachusetts. It was built in 1919 and opened in 1920 by the Goldstein Brothers Amusement Company. The architecture is in the Art Deco style and is considered the last of its type between Boston and Albany. The Victory, a 1,600 seat Broadway-style theater has been derelict since 1979. Bought by Massachusetts International Festival of the Arts (MIFA) in 2009, the Victory will be returned by MIFA, to its role as a major performing arts center for the entire region. Fundraising for the 61 million dollar project continues through private, individual, corporate, and foundation donations, public grants, and State and Federal Historic Tax Credits and New Market Tax Credits. Recently the City of Holyoke made a 2 Million commitment in American Rescue Plan Act (ARPA) funds to the Victory and that the project anticipates funding of $3.5 Million to be allocated to build on these city funds through Governor Healey's capital spending plan.

On December 31, 2020, MIFA Victory Theatre celebrated the theater's 100th Birthday with a virtual event featuring a magical digital treat and specially MIFA commissioned centennial fanfare composed by Iván E. Rodríguez.

== History ==
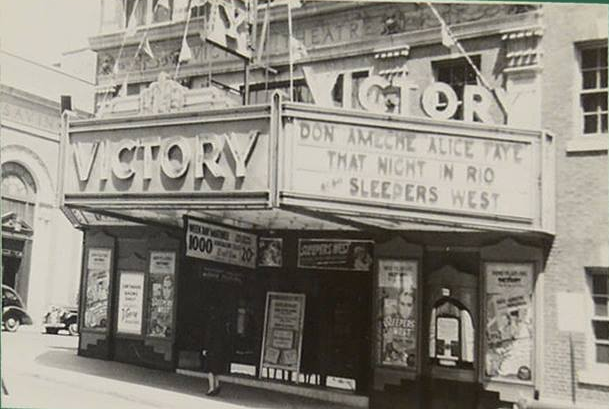
The theater's marquee as it appeared in 1941

Samuel and Nathan Goldstein of Western Massachusetts Theatres Incorporated (at that time known as “G.B. Theatres”) were early pioneers in the movie business, having started in the first decade of the 20th century operating what were then known as “nickelodeons” which were storefront movie houses. Along with The Broadway Theatre in Springfield, the Victory represented their expansion into the “major leagues” as they rode the crest of the wave of the movies’ exploding popularity at the end of World War I. The Victory's name itself is a reference to the Allied Victory in the World War the year before on November 11, 1918. The Eagle Medallion at the center of the proscenium ties it all together.

In the 1920s these grand theatres were known as “presentation houses” and offered a combined bill of a silent film and a stage show on the same program and for a single admission price. The performances were often presented on a “continuous show” basis. The Victory Symphony Orchestra provided accompaniment for the film and music for the live show as well. The Grand Organ often substituted for the orchestra during matinee performances. The relatively shallow depth of the Victory's stage suggests that it was designed for “vaudeville” type acts presented along with a film, rather than fully mounted stage productions. The arrival of “talking pictures” in the late 1920s resulted in the eventual elimination of the live portion of the program.

The theater suffered fire damage in 1942.

The Victory continued to operate on a continuous show basis through the early 1970s, opening daily at 1:00 P.M. and running double feature film programs continuously until 11:00 P.M.

=== Ongoing restoration efforts ===
Architectural rendering of the Victory Theater, as it appeared in final plans approved by the city planning board

The theater closed in 1979 and has sat derelict since; in the mid-1980s the city government was able to obtain the property from a landowner delinquent on more than $50,000 in back taxes. A local group of activists, Save the Victory Theater Inc., led by Helen Casey worked with the city to raise funds to restore it, including help through industrialist Armand Hammer who put his private art collection on display for an exhibit to raise money for the project, netting about $450,000 (about $900,000 2017 USD) donated to the city's Victory Theatre Commission. At the time, an evaluation was made by the Massachusetts Historical Commission that building was eligible to be on the National Register of Historic Places; however the property remains unfiled with the Register and the original project, estimated at $4.5 million in restoration costs, never materialized.

However the Holyoke City Council, owners of the theater, agreed to hand ownership of the theater to the non-profit Massachusetts International Festival of the Arts, for $1,500 in 2009. The group hoped to restore and open the theater to performances in 2016, however the most recent announcement places the opening date at December 20, 2020. In 2017 the project was reported to have a $26 million commitment, however the cost of restoration has gone up considerably since 2009, rising from $27 million to $61 million due to deterioration of the building and operating cost estimates for the initial 5 years of its programming. The group received $11 million in state bonds in addition to $2 million earlier authorized on top of $28.2 million in tax credits and donations, bringing the project in at approximately $43 million in commitments. In September 2018, MIFA stated it would move forward with construction on in June of 2019, hoping to reopen the theater in time for its 100th anniversary; this ultimately did not materialize.

On November 5, 2019, MIFA acquired a property abutting the theater, 134 Chestnut Street, for $224,000, which is expected to be razed as part of a planned larger complex attached to the Victory. Phase 1 of the Victory Theatre restoration process was completed with the removal of building abutting the theater. The 134 Chestnut St. property on the north side of the Victory will be replaced with a new 14,500sq ft. connecting Annex designed by DBVW Architects. The Annex will house essential service, facilities management, technical, dressing room, office, and loading dock space unable to be accommodated in the theater's historic footprint, but needed to provide a larger modern theater facility.

== See also ==
- Holyoke Opera House, former historical theatrical venue
- Paramount Theater (Springfield, Massachusetts), NRHP historical theater in process of redevelopment
- Valley Arena, former sports and entertainment venue
