= Williams & Everett =

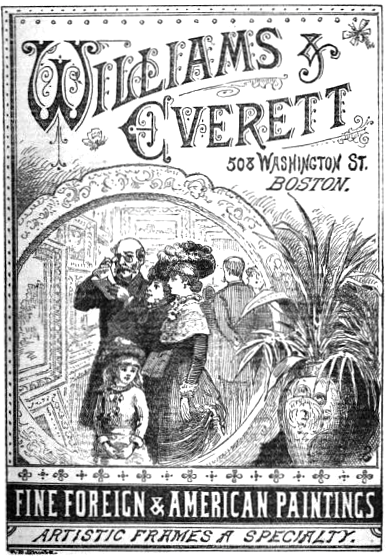
Williams & Everett, Boston, 1882

Williams & Everett (est.1855) in Boston, Massachusetts, was an art dealership run by Henry Dudley Williams and William Everett. The firm sold original artworks by American and European artists, as well as "photographs and carbon-pictures of eminent persons, noted places, and famous paintings." It also continued the mirror and picture frame business that had been established earlier by the Doggett brothers.

== History ==
Gallery founder Dudley Williams had worked for John Doggett & Co., 1816-1855. "John Doggett retired from the firm in 1845, and his brother Samuel in 1854, and the business was reorganized, the manufacture of mirror and picture frames being continued under the name of Williams & Everett, who added the branch of paintings, etc.."

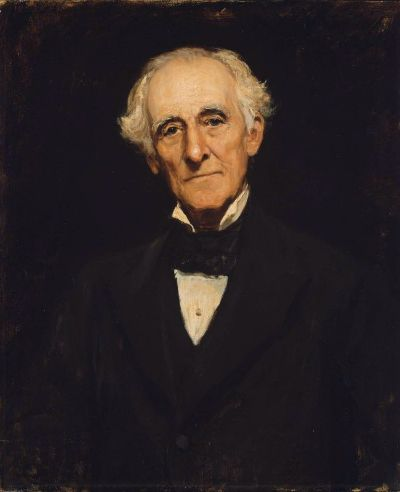
Portrait of Dudley Williams by Hubert von Herkomer, c. 1883 (Museum of Fine Arts, Boston)

Williams and his new business partner, William Everett, were related by marriage; Williams had married Everett's sister Isabel in 1832. Before creating a formal partnership, Williams and Everett each sold mirrors, picture frames and carpets from the same address on Washington Street.

The gallery was located at the corner of Bedford and Washington Street until 1885. The gallery moved in 1885 from downtown to Back Bay, where it remained until the business closed around 1907. "Williams & Everett's Galleries, at No. 79 Boylston Street, were ... designed and built expressly as a repository of the Fine Arts. ... The architectural adornment of the interior is of the English Renaissance, with carved wood and heavy beams in sight. On one side is a carved chimney piece, extending to the ceiling, and near this is a grand staircase leading to a series of galleries, extending from the carved wood coigne which looks down into the store, to the balcony overlooking Park Square. The wainscoting of dark wood is surmounted with pomegranate hangings, and the ceiling is effectively decorated in plain and harmonious tints. Incandescent lights placed in the ceiling in a novel and original manner, are used throughout the store and galleries."

European artists exhibited included Rosa Bonheur and Jean-Baptiste-Camille Corot. Williams & Everett also exhibited and sold works by American artists such as:

- Henry Bacon
- Edward Mitchell Bannister
- Albert Bierstadt
- Bricher
- George L. Brown
- Mary Cassatt
- Frederic Edwin Church
- George Curtis
- Sophia Towne Darrah
- H. Anthony Dyer
- George Fuller
- Régis François Gignoux
- Childe Hassam
- Thomas H. Hinckley
- George Hitchcock
- George Inness
- Ernest Longfellow
- John Low
- A.S. Patterson
- Sarah S. Perkins
- John E.C. Peterson
- William Henry Powell
- W.T. Richards
- Caroline Hunt Rimmer
- Theodore Robinson
- John Rogers
- Henry Sandham
- William Sartain
- Frank Hill Smith
- Tait
- Robert W. Van Boskerck
- Elihu Vedder
- Theodore Wendel
- Moses Wight

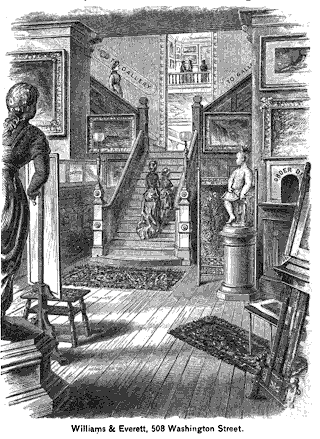
Williams & Everett, Washington Street (corner Bedford Street), Boston, 1881

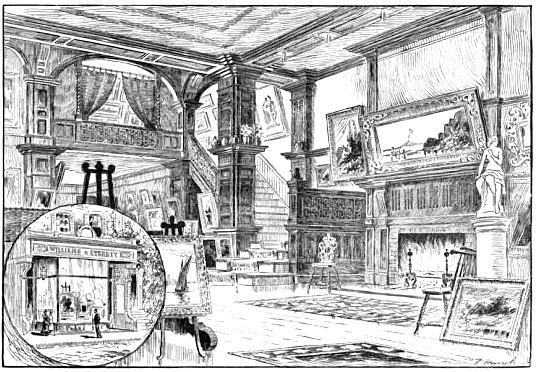
Williams & Everett's, Boylston Street, Boston, 1889

"In the store are departments for etchings, engravings, water colors and photographs. If you desire to purchase a fine impression, a rare proof, a unique etching, a carbon reproduction of a favorite picture by one of the old masters, or a representative work of the modern schools, if you want instructive photographs of ancient sculptures or classic ruins, you are sure to find them in the ample folios of this establishment." The firm published its own pictorial reproductions of selected artworks, such as a chromolithograph of the character "Dotty Dimple" (after Elizabeth Murray), and photographic portraits of H.W. Longfellow and his family.

"Williams & Everett, recognizing the deficiency in the subjects of photographs brought to America, have made this particular branch a specialty. ... One portion of their establishment is entirely devoted to this class of art, and here on the walls are hung large and magnificent carbons of the rarest subjects. Below these pictures of Michael Angelo, frescoes from the Sistine Chapel, his sculptures from the church of San Lorenzo, and the old frescoes of Fra Angelico and Giotto in the convent of San Marco at Florence, are ranged in large wooden cases separately the works of the famous artists, some thousand in number. Here is a whole section devoted to Bellini, another to Cimabue, and another to Velasquez. Their pictures from Spain, Italy, and Germany, France and England, are collected here, and, sitting at the table at which visitors are freely allowed to examine these treasures, a feeling of embarras de richesse comes over one."

Clients included Thomas Thompson. Among the many walk-in visitors to the gallery was Sophia Peabody Hawthorne in 1863: "5 June, Thursday. Finest day - cool. We went out after breakfast with Annie. We visited Studio gallery. ... Then to Williams & Everett's - Then we shopped." "29 September, Monday. I went to town at noon. Went to see Tilton's pictures at Williams & Everetts."

The firm consisted of its founders, Henry Dudley Williams (1809-1888) his brother-in-law William Everett (1821-1899), and their sons, Henry Dudley Williams (1833-1907) and William B. Everett (1856-1907)

In 1901, "Williams & Everett ... made an assignment. The liabilities are said to be between $40,000 and $50,000, and the assets consist principally if a large stock of prints, engravings and paintings of high quality. The firm, since the death of Mr. Everett several years ago, has consisted of Henry D. Williams. It is the hope of the firm and assignee that the affairs can be arranged without interruption of business and in such a manner as to re-establish the business on a firm foundation." The firm seems to have ceased with the death of H.D. Williams in 1907.
