= Mountain Born (1972 film) =

1972 Disney television film

- Based on: Mountain Born by Elizabeth Yates
- Directed by: James Algar
- Starring: Sam Austin; Walter Stroud; Jolene Terry
- Narrated by: Mayf Nutter
- Composer: Buddy Baker
- Country of origin: United States
- Original language: English

Production
- Production company: Walt Disney Productions

Original release
- Network: NBC
- Release: January 9, 1972

Mountain Born is a 1972 American television film produced by Walt Disney Productions for The Wonderful World of Disney. Directed by James Algar, it aired on NBC on January 9, 1972.

The film is based on the 1943 children's novel Mountain Born by Elizabeth Yates.

Buddy Baker composed the music for the film, but Sam Austin, the film's 11-year-old star, wrote and sang its theme song, "Mountain Born".

== Cast ==
- Mayf Nutter as the Narrator
- Sam Austin as Jason
- Walter Stroud as Benji
- Jolene Terry as Martha
