= Sheldon S. Sawyer =

American politician (1935–2026)

Member of the New Hampshire House of Representatives from the Cheshire 2nd district
- In office 2004–2006

Personal details
- Born: Sheldon Scott Sawyer; May 25, 1935 Jaffrey, New Hampshire, U.S.
- Died: June 13, 2026 (aged 91)
- Party: Republican
- Spouse(s): Carol Holmes Gage (divorced) Wendy Horton (divorced) Rosella Burk Sawyer
- Education: University of New Hampshire

Sheldon Scott Sawyer (May 25, 1935 – June 13, 2026) was an American politician. A member of the Republican Party, he served in the New Hampshire House of Representatives from 2004 to 2006.

== Early life and career ==
Sawyer was born in Jaffrey, New Hampshire, the son of Jason Sawyer and Elizabeth Doty. He attended Conant High School, graduating in 1953. He also attended the University of New Hampshire, graduating in 1957. After graduating, he worked as an agriculture teacher at Walpole High School from 1958 to 1961. He was a farmer.

He served in the New Hampshire House of Representatives from 2004 to 2006.

== Personal life and death ==
Sawyer was married to Carol Holmes Gage, and their marriage ended in divorce. He then married Wendy Horton, and his second marriage ended in divorce. After his second marriage, he married Rosella Burk Sawyer. Their marriage lasted until Sawyer's death in 2026.

Sawyer died on June 13, 2026, at the age of 91.
