= Paramount Theater (Springfield, Massachusetts) =

- Julia Sanderson Theater
- U.S. National Register of Historic Places
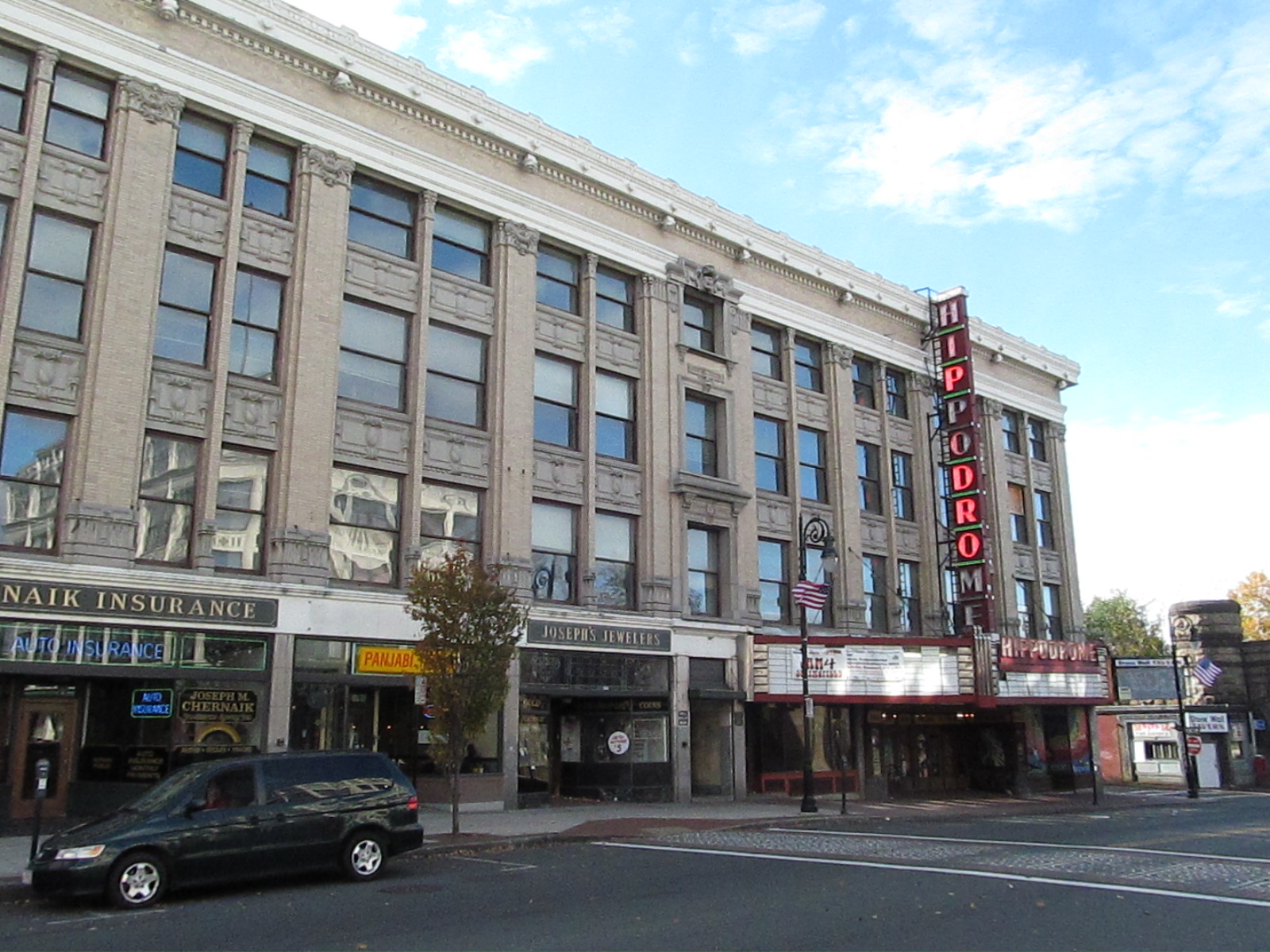
- The Hippodrome

- Location within Massachusetts Location within the United States
- Location: Springfield, Massachusetts
- Coordinates: 42°6′14″N 72°35′44″W
- Built: 1912
- Architect: Carlson, Ernest F.
- Architectural style: Classical Revival
- NRHP reference No.: 79000348
- Added to NRHP: May 10, 1979

The Paramount Theater (formerly known as Julia Sanderson Theater and The Hippodrome) is an historic theater located at 1676-1708 Main Street in Springfield, Massachusetts. Built in 1926 out of part of the grand Massasoit House hotel at a cost of over $1 million, the Paramount Theater was the most ornate picture palace in Western Massachusetts. As of 2011, The Paramount is in the midst of a $1.725 million renovation to once again become a theater after decades as a disco and concert hall, (the Hippodrome), when it was the center of Springfield's club scene. In 2018 the building's owners, the New England Farm Workers Council, announced plans to redevelop it in tandem with a new adjacent hotel building. In a push to renovate the Paramount along with Holyoke's Victory Theater, in October 2018, the administration of Massachusetts Governor Charlie Baker announced a $2.5 million grant to assist the project, on top of a $4 million federal loan guarantee. However, the New England Farm Workers Council would subsequently announce plans to sell the building on July 30, 2024. An auction was slated for August 20 of that year before being delayed to September 23. The winner, Mohan C. Sachdev, announced plans to start renovation work in March 2026.

== History ==
From 1926 until the 1960s, The Paramount changed names several times—including a brief stint as the Julia Sanderson Theater, honoring a famous actress from Springfield. However, it remained a movie theater until the 1960s, when it began to find use as a mixed use venue for movies, rock concerts, and other live performances. The building was added to the National Register of Historic Places in 1979.

In 1999, the venue was purchased and restored by Steven Stein and Michael Barrasso of Paramount Realty Investment LLC/Creative Theater Concepts. At that time, it was turned into a lavish nightclub and performance space. The venue's main floor seats were removed; however, the 1,100 balcony seats were retained and restored. The theater underwent a $1.3 million renovation in 1999, and was reopened as the Hippodrome. The original organ was restored and the marquee was changed to reflect the theater's new name.

The Hippodrome became a popular nightclub and concert venue during the 2000s. In 2011, the theater was purchased by the New England Farm Worker's Council, who planned a $1.725 million renovation to once again make it a theater and performance space. However, this never happened. Instead, the building was sold in an auction to Mohan C. Sachdev, a Connecticut-based real estate developer. On December 12, 2025, Sachdev announced plans to replace the building's roof in March 2026, with further renovations to follow afterward.

== See also ==
- National Register of Historic Places listings in Springfield, Massachusetts
- National Register of Historic Places listings in Hampden County, Massachusetts
