= Mountain Born =

1943 children's novel by Elizabeth Yates

- Author: Elizabeth Yates
- Illustrator: Nora Spicer Unwin
- Language: English
- Genre: Children's literature / Adventure
- Publisher: Coward
- Publication date: 1943
- Publication place: United States

Mountain Born is a 1943 children's historical novel written by Elizabeth Yates and illustrated by Nora Spicer Unwin. Set in the sparsely populated Rocky Mountains during the 19th century, it describes the life of a shepherding family. The novel was a Newbery Honor recipient in 1944.

== Film adaptation ==
In 1972, a movie based on the book and shot in Telluride, Colorado, was broadcast on The Wonderful World of Disney.
