= Lucy Barnes (writer) =

19th-century American writer

- Born: March 6, 1780; Jaffrey, New Hampshire, U.S.
- Died: August 29, 1809 (aged 29)
- Occupation: writer
- Writing career
- Language: English
- Genres: letters; verse; prose
- Subject: Universalism
- Notable work: The Female Christian

Lucy Barnes (March 6, 1780 – August 29, 1809) was an 18th-century American writer. Soon after her death, some of Barnes' letters, dissertations, and poems were collected and printed. Entitled, The Female Christian, it may have been the first written by a woman in defense of Universalism.

== Early life and education ==
Lucy Barnes, eldest daughter of Rev. Thomas Barnes, was born in Jaffrey, New Hampshire, March 6, 1780. Her father was the first Universalist minister in Maine.

When a child she was sweet in disposition, gentle in deportment, but very undemonstrative, unless an opportunity presented itself by which she could serve someone, or reconcile contending parties; "and then," says the "Christian Intelligencer" of 1825, "she would wear a smile of complacency and satisfaction that was beautiful and heavenly." Her opportunities for an education were very limited, but she was an omnivorous reader, and could repeat what she read as easily as most could repeat the chit-chat of an afternoon.

== Career ==
When she was 19 years old, Barnes made a profession of religious creed. At about that time, her father removed to Poland, Maine, at which place a frantic "reformation" was going on. She attended the meetings, and gave all the arguments and all the warnings a most careful and respectful consideration; "for," she said, "if their explanations are correct, and this singular work is sanctioned by divine authority, I am perfectly willing and ready to embrace Methodism." She was always interested in religious discussions, and read the Bible with great interest, but at this time, she read verse by verse, and conscientiously considered the import of every word. The more she read, the more clearly she saw the fallacy of the popular explanations, and the more truthful seemed the doctrine that she ever after lived by, and at last died believing.

As soon as it was known that Barnes had openly proclaimed that she could not put bounds to the love of God, and announced her belief in Universalist doctrine, crowds visited her for the purpose of either driving or persuading her from that belief. Barnes had a peculiar aptitude for logical reasoning, and presented her points so persuasively, and in so amiable and loving a manner, that the most intelligent became convinced that her "weapons were not carnal but mighty," and were generous enough to say she was a "real Christian," even if she had embraced the awful doctrine of universal salvation. She was constantly trying to impress upon the young the principles of morality, and their duty to live Christian lives.

Soon after her death some of her letters, dissertations and poems were collected and printed in a pamphlet of 71 pages, entitled The Female Christian. In the Gospel Banner, of 1858, there was a review of the pamphlet by Rev. John Wesley Hanson, then editor. This may have been the first book written by a woman in defense of Universalism. He said, "The passages from the letters, verse and prose of the fair, frail hand that has for fifty years been cold can not fail to be read with interest."

The Christian Intelligencer, of 1825, of Portland, Maine, publisher of her father's memoir states, "Miss Barnes from infancy had in warm weather been sorely afflicted with asthma, but for several years before her death the complaint became more severe and alarming. Though the distress and pressure at the lungs were frequently so great that she seemed to be in the agonies of death, the first language she uttered would be intended to console and comfort her parents. Her individual hope in Christ, and her faith in the universal salvation, remained firm and unwavering to the last, and even in the dread struggles of expiring nature the smile of heavenly serenity was visible on her countenance, evincing a willingness to sleep in death, that she might rest in God."

A short quotation from the last written exhortation of Barnes, finished only the day before she died read, "Let us, therefore, be humble, and endeavor to pursue the paths of peace, and to walk in the straight and narrow way. And whenever we discover any going on in vice and wickedness, and walking in the broad road in search of happiness, let us pity their weakness and folly, and mistaken ideas of bliss, and endeavor, if possible, to restore them in the spirit of meekness, "considering ourselves lest we also be tempted. For if we had their temptations, rue might perhaps do equally as bad or even worse than they. May every blessing attend you which can contribute in the least both to your temporal and spiritual welfare. May the God of peace be with you always; may you be patient in tribulation, remembering that whom the Lord loveth he chasteneth. and that these afflictions which are sent for our profit are but short, but the joys which will soon dawn upon us are of a duration."

It was said that though her style was not ornamented with the tinsel of rhetoric, it was enriched with the unstudied fervor, gravity, and resignation which would be requisite to a chapter of an inspired volume.

== Personal life ==
With regard to her health, Barnes stated, "It is very low indeed. I am not able to walk out of my room, nor to sit up but a few moments at a time, so that I have been many days in writing these lines; but although they are penned by a feeble hand, yet, through the grace of God, they proceed from a heart strong in faith, though on the verge of eternity."

She died August 29, 1809, at the age of 29.

== Selected works ==
- The Female Christian, containing a sketch from the writings of Miss Lucy Barnes, who departed from this life Aug. 25th, 1809. she "being dead yet speaketh." (Portland, Maine: Printed at the Argus Office Francis Douglas, Printer, 1809)
