= Frank Hill Smith =

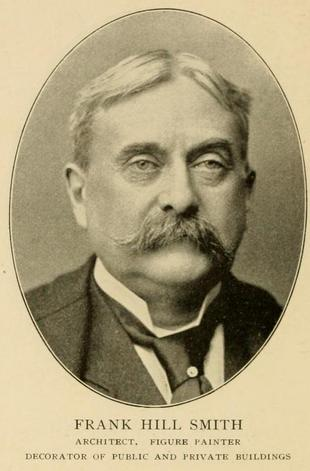
Frank Hill Smith

Frank Hill Smith (1842–1904) was an American artist and interior designer based in Boston, Massachusetts. He painted landscapes and figures; and designed wall frescos, stage curtains, stained-glass windows, and other décor. Among his works are ceiling frescoes in the Representatives Hall in the Massachusetts State House.

== Life and career ==
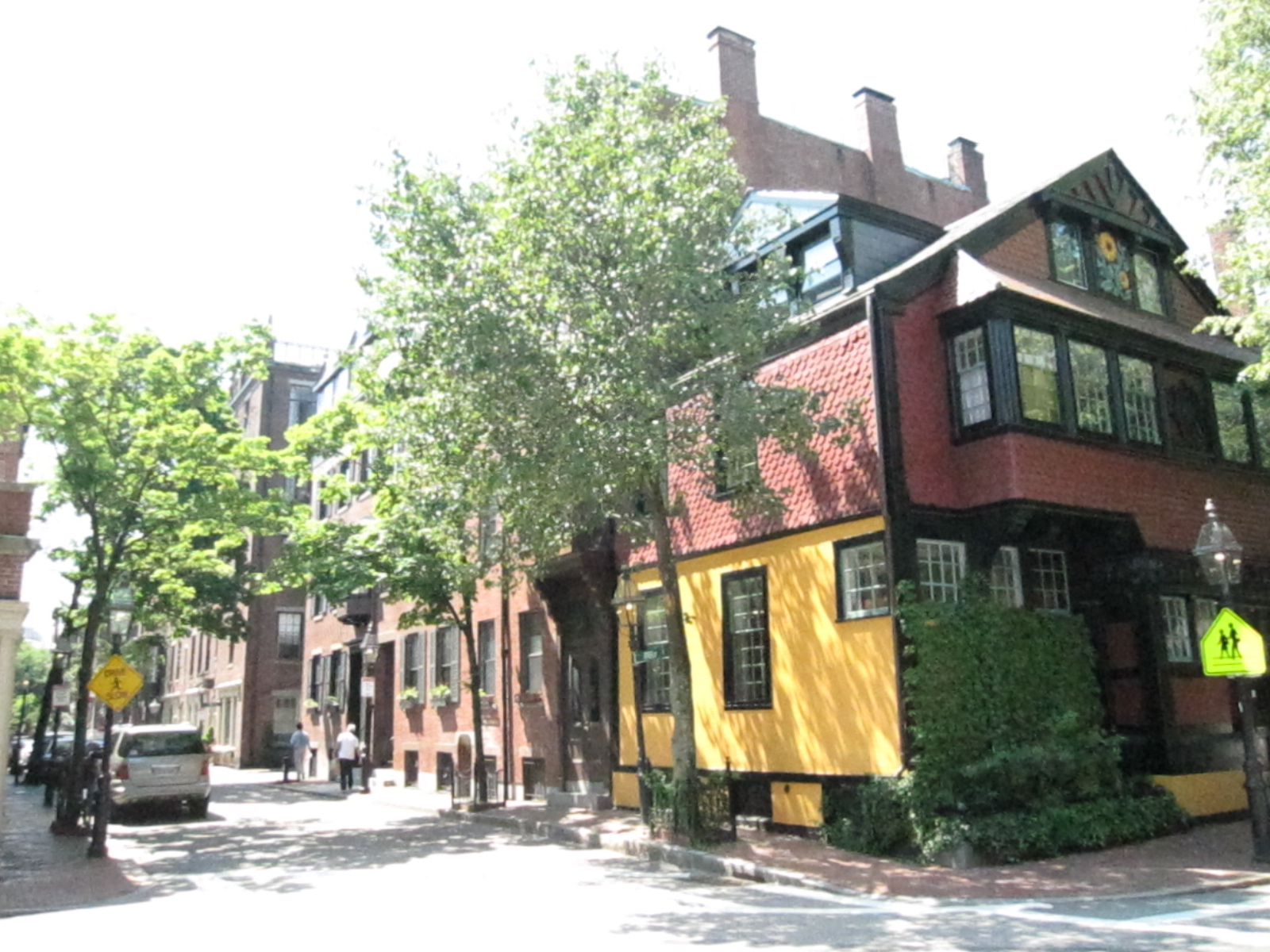
Sunflower House, Beacon Hill, where Smith lived c. 1864 (photo taken 2010)

In Boston Smith trained with Hammatt Billings (c. 1859) and also studied at the Lowell Institute. As part of his training he "drew from the antique at the Athenaeum." He travelled in Europe in the 1860s, studying at "the atelier Suisse, in Paris, and ... with [Léon] Bonnat and other noted French painters" (1865).

In the 1870s "there is no doubt that Smith, [Albion Harris] Bicknell, [Thomas] Robinson, Cole, [William Morris] Hunt, Waterman, and, later on, [Frederic Porter] Vinton, and one or two others, had pretty much the swing of art in Boston for several years. ... They were constantly together, working like brothers in the cause. ... Smith, Robinson, and Hunt used to paint a great deal together; in fact, they formed a triumvirate club to 'sass one another's pictures,' as Hunt termed it."

In 1880 New York's "Union League Club ... contracted with John La Farge, Frank Hill Smith, Augustus Saint-Gaudens, and Will H. Low to undertake decoration of ... areas in [its] new building." In 1886 Smith was "working on the plans of a Casino, to be erected in Green Bay, Florida. The designs are drawn in a broad, artistic manner, and are the most extensive for comfort and elegance of any known in this country. It is estimated that it will require $350,000 to erect and finish the structure."

Around this time he designed a cottage intended for Walt Whitman; it was never built. He painted an "elegant drop curtain" for the Fairhaven Town Hall auditorium, in Massachusetts, c. 1894. Smith also painted ceiling frescoes in the Representatives Hall in the Massachusetts State House, depicting portraits of Samuel Adams, John Hancock, James Otis and Joseph Warren.

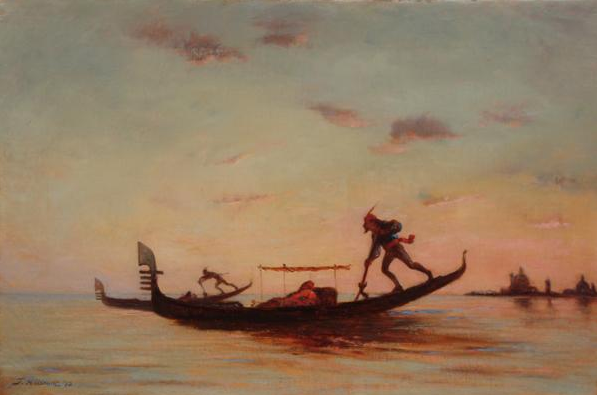
Gondoliers, Venice, 1873; painted by Smith

In Boston's Beacon Hill, he lived in the Sunflower House on the corner of River and Mt. Vernon Streets. A local newspaper described it:

One of the things to see here is the house of Mr. Frank Hill Smith, the artist. He has transformed an old wooden building at the corner of Mt. Vernon and River Streets into the most attractive and picturesque place in the city. ... The upper story and roof are tiled, the windows are abundant and pretty; on the front of the large gable in the roof is a huge sunflower in high relief; below it, on the upper story, is a winged lion in relief; over the front door is a course of grotesque, open carving; the whole is painted yellow, and is so attractive that people who love light and sunshine hover about it like moths round a candle. There is nothing in New England in the least like it; and Mr. Fields did it no more than justice when he brought it into his lecture on Cheerfulness, a day or two ago, with a hearty compliment to its originality, and its cheering influence.

Smith exhibited works in the Museum of Fine Arts in Copley Square (1877) and Williams & Everett's gallery (c. 1877). He belonged to Boston's St. Botolph Club. He also acted as a judge in the 1876 U.S. Centennial Exhibition in Philadelphia. Around the 1880s he served on the "Permanent Committee of the School of Drawing and Painting of the Museum of Fine Arts," Boston.

Smith died at Boston in 1904.

His descendants included artist Fannie Hillsmith.

== Gallery ==
Paintings by F.H. Smith

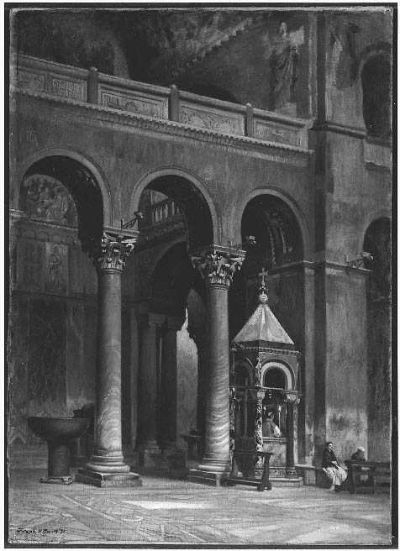
St. Mark's, Venice, 1871 (Museum of Fine Arts, Boston)

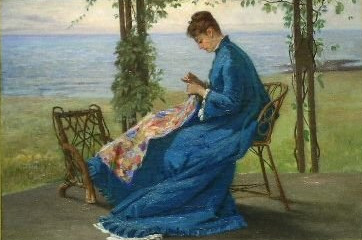
c. 1875

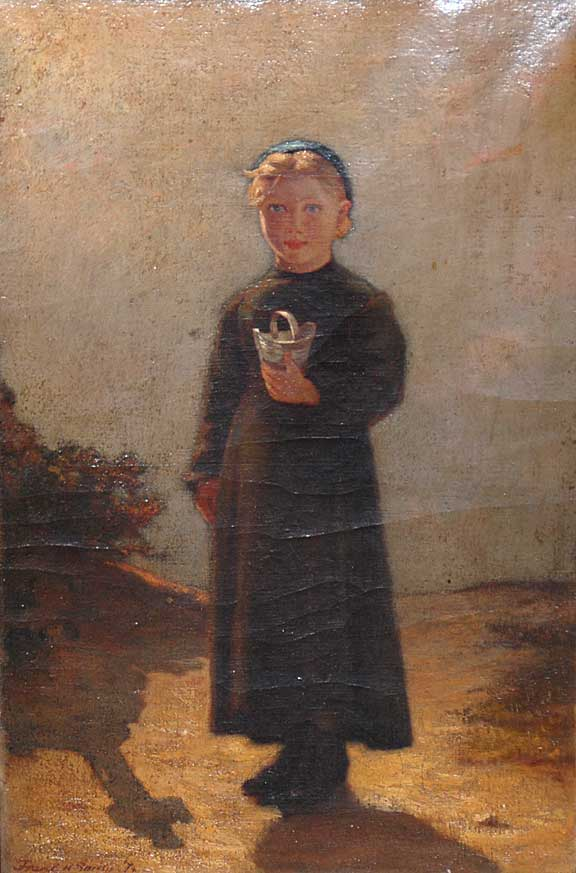
1876

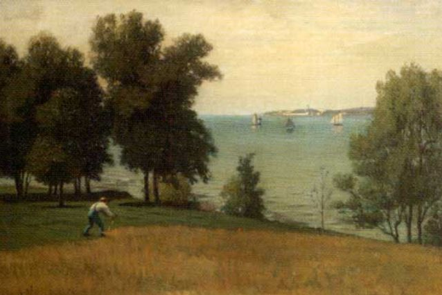
19th century

== Designs by Smith ==
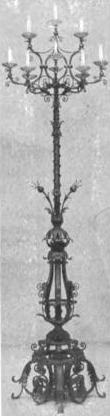
Ironwork designed by Smith, c. 1897

- Young's Hotel, Boston
- Union League Club of New York Club-House interior, c. 1881 (5th Ave. and 39th St.)
- House, Falmouth, Massachusetts, c. 1886
- Casino, Green Bay, Florida, 1886
- Cafe, Dunderberg Mount, New York, c. 1890
- Massachusetts State House Representatives Hall frescoes, Boston, 1894
- Holyoke Opera House, Holyoke, Massachusetts
- Cottage intended for Walt Whitman (not built)
- Union Club, Chicago
- Christ Church, Cambridge, Massachusetts
- Puritan steamer ship, Old Colony Steamboat Co.
