= Laban Ainsworth =

American clergyman and pastor

Laban Ainsworth (July 19, 1757 – March 17, 1858) was an American clergyman and pastor. He holds the record for the longest serving pastorate in American history. He served as pastor in Jaffrey, New Hampshire from 1782 to 1858, a period of 76 years.

== Biography ==
Laban Ainsworth was born in Woodstock, Connecticut on July 19, 1757, to Captain William Ainsworth and his wife, Mary Ainsworth. As a result of suffering a severe attack of scarlet fever in childhood, young Laban's right arm became withered and "nearly useless to him for life." As a result of this disability, he was able to focus on his education. While he hoped to enter Harvard College in 1775, the outbreak of the American Revolutionary War prevented him from doing this and instead caused him to attend Dartmouth College—from which he graduated in 1778.

At Stockbridge, Massachusetts, he studied theology under the guidance of Reverend Stephen West. He also preached for two years at Spencertown, New York, where he served as a chaplain for a few months with Major McKinstry's Corps in the American Revolutionary Army. In 1782, he became pastor of Jaffrey, New Hampshire—a position that he held until his death 76 years later at age 100. In 1787, he married Mary Minot (1761–1845) and had two children with her, Sarah (1789–1857) and William (1792–1842).
