= Jaffrey, New Hampshire =

- Town
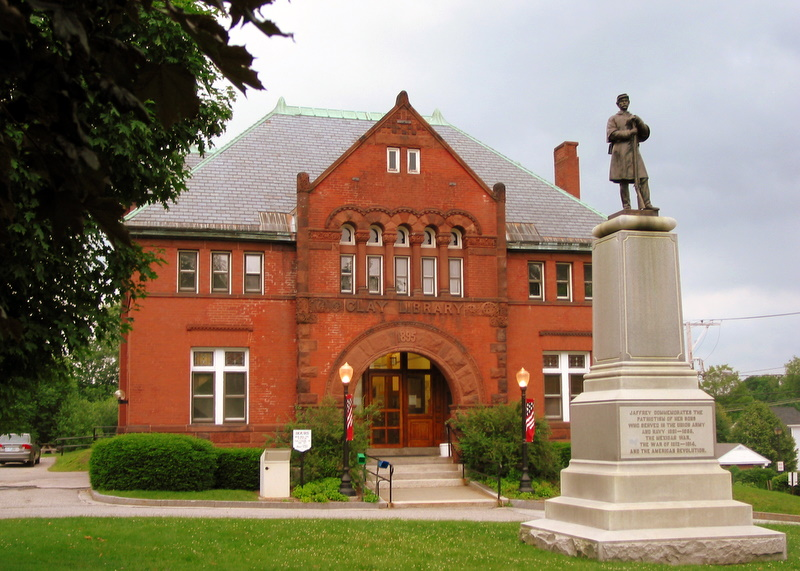
- Clay Memorial Library, listed on the National Register of Historic Places

- Seal

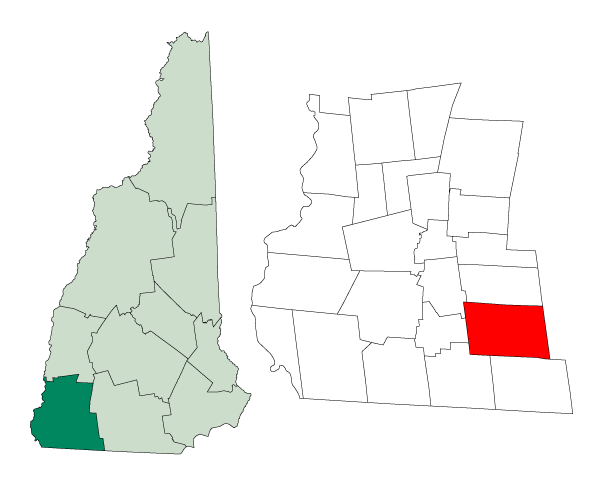
- Location in Cheshire County, New Hampshire
- Coordinates: 42°49′45″N 72°03′35″W
- Country: United States
- State: New Hampshire
- County: Cheshire
- Incorporated: 1773
- Villages: Jaffrey; Jaffrey Center

Area
  - Total: 40.2 sq mi (104.1 km^{2})
  - Land: 38.4 sq mi (99.5 km^{2})
  - Water: 1.8 sq mi (4.6 km^{2}) 4.42%
- Elevation: 1,083 ft (330 m)

Population (2020)
  - Total: 5,320
  - Density: 139/sq mi (53.5/km^{2})
- Time zone: UTC-5 (Eastern)
  - Summer (DST): UTC-4 (Eastern)
- ZIP code: 03452
- Area code: 603
- FIPS code: 33-38500
- GNIS feature ID: 873633
- Website: www.townofjaffrey.com

Jaffrey is a town in Cheshire County, New Hampshire, United States. The population was 5,320 at the 2020 census, and an estimated 5,633 in 2025.

The main village in town, where 3,058 people resided at the 2020 census, is defined as the Jaffrey census-designated place (CDP) and is located along the Contoocook River at the junction of U.S. Route 202 with New Hampshire Routes 124 and 137.

== History ==
First granted by the Massachusetts General Court in 1736 to soldiers from Rowley, Massachusetts, returning from the war in Canada, the town was known as "Rowley-Canada". In 1749, the town was re-chartered by the Mason proprietors as "Monadnock No. 2", sometimes called "Middle Monadnock" or "Middletown". It was one of the first towns established following the Masonian proprietors' purchase of undivided lands under the claim.

Settled about 1758, the town was regranted in 1767. It was incorporated in 1773 by Governor John Wentworth and named for George Jaffrey, member of a wealthy Portsmouth family. Jaffrey's son was a life trustee of Dartmouth College and designer of the official college seal. The Contoocook River provided water power for mills. Village prosperity would be expressed in fine early architecture, including the Town Meetinghouse, built in 1775.

Beginning in the 1840s, the area's scenic beauty attracted tourists, and several summer hotels were built at the base of Mount Monadnock, enduringly popular with hikers. Some who scaled the summit were Ralph Waldo Emerson, Henry David Thoreau and Rudyard Kipling. The experience inspired Emerson in 1845 to write the poem, Monadnoc.

Jaffrey was the setting for a 1950 biography by Elizabeth Yates entitled Amos Fortune, Free Man, winner of the 1951 Newbery Medal. Amos Fortune was an African-born slave who purchased his freedom and that of his wife, and established a tannery in the village. He is buried in the local cemetery, as are bandbox craftswoman Hannah Davis and author and summer resident Willa Cather.

Jaffrey was the inspiration for a chapter in Parliament of Whores by P. J. O'Rourke, who was a resident for several years.

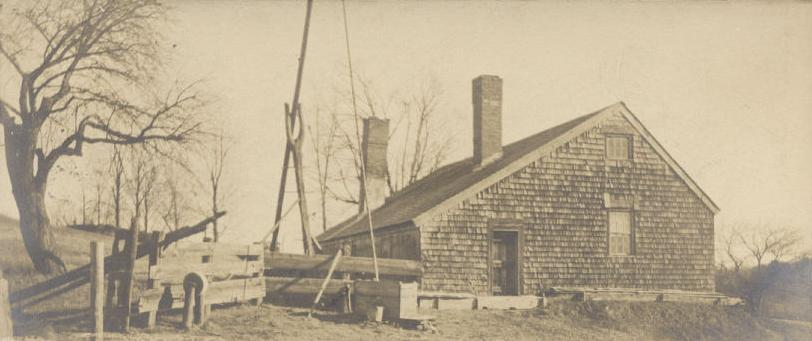
Old Baker Home, which was the oldest house in Jaffrey in 1905

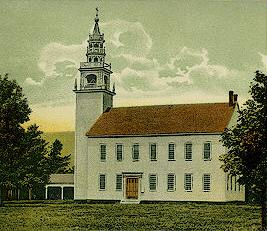
Town Hall in 1905

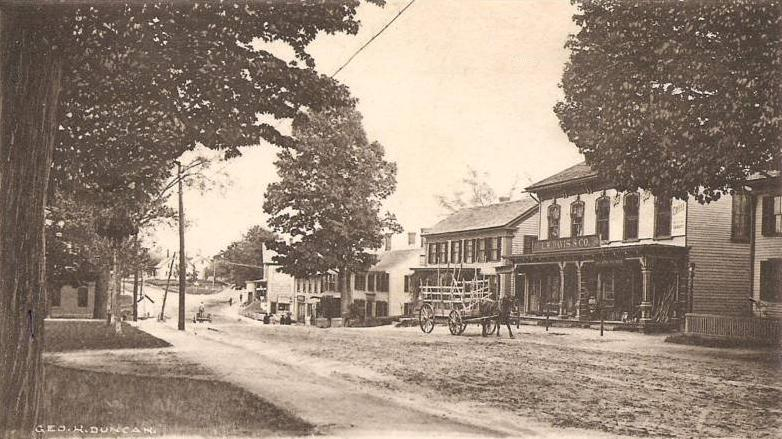
Main Street in 1907

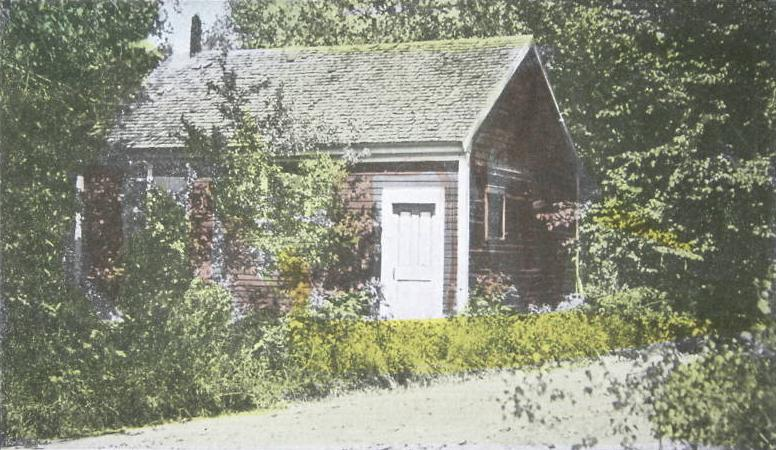
Old schoolhouse c. 1915

== Geography ==
According to the United States Census Bureau, the town has a total area of 40.2 square miles (104.1 km^{2}), of which 38.4 square miles (99.5 km^{2}) are land and 1.8 square miles (4.6 km^{2}) are water, comprising 4.42% of the town. Jaffrey village is in the eastern part of the town, and the smaller village of Jaffrey Center is near the town center.

Thorndike Pond is in the north, and Contoocook Lake is on the southern boundary. Mount Monadnock, elevation 3,165 feet (965 m) and the highest point in Jaffrey as well as Cheshire County, is in the northwest. Jaffrey lies mostly within the Merrimack River watershed, via the Contoocook River in the eastern part of the town, with the northwest corner of town lying in the Ashuelot River watershed, part of the larger Connecticut River watershed.

=== Adjacent municipalities ===
- Dublin (north)
- Peterborough (northeast)
- Sharon (east)
- Rindge (south)
- Fitzwilliam (southwest)
- Troy (west)
- Marlborough (northwest)

== Demographics ==
Historical population
Census	Pop.	Note	%±
1790	1,235		—
1800	1,341		8.6%
1810	1,336		−0.4%
1820	1,339		0.2%
1830	1,354		1.1%
1840	1,411		4.2%
1850	1,497		6.1%
1860	1,453		−2.9%
1870	1,256		−13.6%
1880	1,267		0.9%
1890	1,469		15.9%
1900	1,801		22.6%
1910	1,895		5.2%
1920	2,303		21.5%
1930	2,485		7.9%
1940	2,879		15.9%
1950	2,911		1.1%
1960	3,154		8.3%
1970	3,353		6.3%
1980	4,349		29.7%
1990	5,361		23.3%
2000	5,476		2.1%
2010	5,457		−0.3%
2020	5,320		−2.5%
2024 (est.)	5,549		4.3%
U.S. Decennial Census

As of the census of 2010, there were 5,457 people, 2,234 households, and 1,451 families residing in the town. There were 2,547 housing units, of which 313, or 12.3%, were vacant. 160 of the vacant units were for seasonal or recreational use. The racial makeup of the town was 96.2% white, 0.4% African American, 0.2% Native American, 1.2% Asian, 0.04% Native Hawaiian or Pacific Islander, 0.3% some other race, and 1.7% from two or more races. 1.6% of the population were Hispanic or Latino of any race.

Of the 2,234 households, 30.9% had children under the age of 18 living with them, 48.4% were headed by married couples living together, 11.1% had a female householder with no husband present, and 35.0% were non-families. 28.6% of all households were made up of individuals, and 10.5% were someone living alone who was 65 years of age or older. The average household size was 2.41, and the average family size was 2.95.

In the town, 24.0% of the population were under the age of 18, 7.8% were from 18 to 24, 23.2% from 25 to 44, 29.6% from 45 to 64, and 15.3% were 65 years of age or older. The median age was 41.5 years. For every 100 females, there were 93.5 males. For every 100 females age 18 and over, there were 91.4 males.

For the period 2011–2015, the estimated median annual income for a household was $56,618, and the median income for a family was $73,564. Male full-time workers had a median income of $50,138 versus $39,434 for females. The per capita income for the town was $27,689. 15.0% of the population and 6.5% of families were below the poverty line. 28.3% of the population under the age of 18 and 15.9% of those 65 or older were living in poverty.

== School system ==
Jaffrey, along with the town of Rindge, forms the Jaffrey-Rindge Cooperative School District, also known as SAU 47. The public schools in the town are Jaffrey Grade School (grades PK–5), and Conant Middle High School (6–12). There is also a private high school, Victory High School (9–12).

== Notable people ==
- Laban Ainsworth (1757–1858), minister
- Lucy Barnes (1780–1809), writer
- Vannevar Bush (1890–1974), engineer; played an instrumental role in the Manhattan Project
- Andrew Card (born 1947), politician and former White House Chief of Staff
- Willa Cather (1873–1947), author
- Francis Joseph Christian (born 1942), retired auxiliary bishop, Diocese of Manchester
- Walter S. Crosley (1871–1939), rear admiral in the United States Navy
- Daniel Bateman Cutter (1808–1889),member of the New Hampshire General Court
- Amos Fortune (c. 1710–1801), early resident, tanner
- Fannie Hillsmith (1911–2007), painter
- Alfred B. Kittredge (1861–1911), US senator from South Dakota
- James Laurence Laughlin (1850–1933), economist
- Talcott Parsons (1902–1979), sociologist
- Jedediah Sanger (1751–1829), founder of New Hartford, New York
- Sheldon S. Sawyer (1935–2026), politician
- Levi Spaulding (1791–1873), missionary
- Oliver L. Spaulding (1833–1922), Civil War general, politician
