= Elizabeth Yates (writer) =

American writer

- Born: Mary Elizabeth Yates; December 6, 1905; Buffalo, New York
- Died: July 29, 2001 (aged 95); Concord, New Hampshire, US
- Occupation: Writer
- Spouse: William McGreal
- Writing career
- Language: English
- Genre: Children's literature
- Notable work: Amos Fortune, Free Man
- Notable awards: Newbery Medal; 1951

Elizabeth Yates McGreal (December 6, 1905 – July 29, 2001) was an American writer. She may have been known best for the biographical novel Amos Fortune, Free Man, winner of the 1951 Newbery Medal. She had been a Newbery runner-up in 1944 for Mountain Born. She began her writing career as a journalist, contributing travel articles to The Christian Science Monitor and The New York Times. Many of her books were illustrated by the British artist Nora S. Unwin.

Yates wrote a three-volume autobiography: My Diary – My World (1981), My Widening World (1983), and One Writer's Way (1984).

== Biography ==
Elizabeth Yates was born in Buffalo, New York, the daughter of Harry and Mary Duffy Yates. She was the seventh of eight children. Her father was a farmer, and she developed a love of animals and nature due to her upbringing while her mother contributed to her love of literature and writing.

In 1924, she attended Franklin School before spending a year at Oaksmere, a private school near New York City, founded by mathematician Winifred Edgerton Merrill.

After her schooling was finished, she moved to Manhattan and began writing book reviews and newspaper articles. In 1929, she married William Henry and the couple moved to England, where they lived for the next 10 years. In 1938, her first book, High Holiday, was an adult novel set in the Swiss Alps.

The couple returned to the United States in 1939, and settled in Peterborough, New Hampshire. They bought a farm, and a discovery of old artwork during the restoration of the farmhouse prompted Yates to write Patterns on the Wall. Personal experience formed the basis of many of Yates' novels.

Yates conducted writer's workshops at the University of New Hampshire, the University of Connecticut, and Indiana University. She also served as the Director of the New Hampshire Association for the Blind.

Yates was widowed in 1963. She died at a hospice in Concord, New Hampshire on July 29, 2001, at the age of 95.

== Recognition ==
In 1943, Patterns on the Wall received the Herald Tribune Award. Yates' novel, Amos Fortune, Free Man, received the Newbery Medal, the inaugural William Allen White Children's Book Award, and the Herald Tribune Award. Mountain Born received a Newbery Honor in 1944 and was made into a movie of the same name in 1972, while in 1955 Rainbow Round the World received the Jane Addams Children's Book Award from the Women's International League for Peace and Freedom.

In 1970, she was given the Sarah Josepha Hale Award "in recognition of a distinguished body of work in the field of literature and letters".

In the 1990s, the New Hampshire Association for the Blind began the William and Elizabeth Yates McGreal Society. Yates had been a previous President of the Board, while her husband was the Association's first Executive Director.

In 1994, the Concord, New Hampshire Public Library created the Elizabeth Yates Award to honor an individual in the greater Concord area who is actively engaged in inspiring young people to read.

== Notable works ==
- High Holiday (1938)
- Climbing Higher (1939)
- Patterns on the Wall (1943)
- Mountain Born (1943)
- Amos Fortune, Free Man (1950)
- A Place for Peter (1952)
- Rainbow 'round the World: A Story of UNICEF (1954)
- Prudence Crandall, Woman of Courage (1955)
- Pebble in a Pool: The Widening Circles of Dorothy Canfield Fisher's Life (1958)
- The Lighted Heart (1960)
- Someday You'll Write (1962)
- Carolina's Courage (1964)
- Skeezer, Dog with a Mission (1973)
- My Diary—My World (1981)
- My Widening World (1983)
- One Writer's Way (1984)
