= The Children's Hour (poem) =

Poem by Longfellow

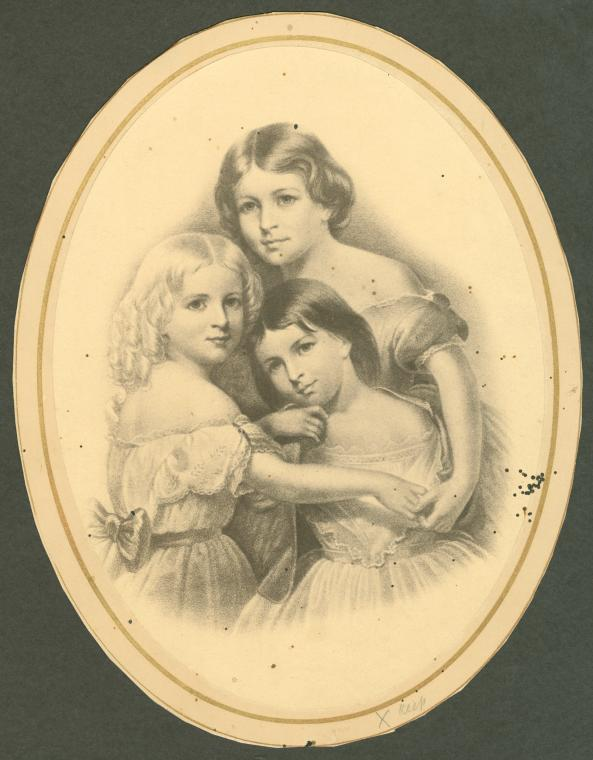
Print of Thomas Buchanan Read's portrait of Longfellow's three daughters

"The Children's Hour" is a poem by American poet Henry Wadsworth Longfellow, first published in the September 1860 edition of The Atlantic Monthly.

== Overview ==
The poem describes the poet's idyllic family life with his own three daughters, Alice, Edith, and Anne Allegra: "grave Alice, and laughing Allegra, and Edith with golden hair." As the darkness begins to fall, the narrator of the poem (Longfellow himself) is sitting in his study and hears his daughters in the room above. He describes them as an approaching army about to enter through a "sudden rush" and a "sudden raid" via unguarded doors. Climbing into his arms, the girls "devour" their father with kisses, who in turn promises to keep them forever in the dungeon of his heart.

== Publication and response ==
"The Children's Hour" was first published in the September 1860 issue of The Atlantic Monthly. It was later included in the Birds of Passage section at the end of the 1863 collection Tales of a Wayside Inn. Longfellow's publisher James T. Fields was enthusiastic about the poem, noting that it would be adored by "the parental public". A group portrait of the three Longfellow daughters by Thomas Buchanan Read was widely reproduced and distributed along with the poem. A copy of the print was found near the body of a soldier at the American Civil War Battle of Gettysburg after the July 1 – July 3, 1863 battle, now held by the Maine Historical Society. In 1883, a year after the poet's death, a tableau vivant was staged titled Longfellow's Dream and featured his life and works, including "The Children's Hour".

By the early 20th century, "The Children's Hour" became one of the poems most frequently taught in American schools. In 1924, for example, one study noted it was often taught in grades 3 to 6. Educator R. L. Lyman, who conducted the study, found it problematic, writing that the poem, "in vocabulary, allusion and atmosphere," was not an appropriate choice and concluded, "'The Children's Hour' is a true poem about children; it is not, as we have assumed, a poem primarily for children." "The Children's Hour" has remained one of the most frequently cited favorite American poems.

More recently, the poem has been called overly-sentimental, as have many of Longfellow's works. Scholar Richard Ruland, for example, warns that modern readers might find it "not only simple and straightforward, but perhaps saccharine overly emotional", though he concludes it is a successful poem. Scholar Matthew Gartner, however, uses the poem as an example of how Longfellow invited his readers into his private home life in New England to refine them and teach them lessons in virtue. Scholar Jeffrey Hotz notes that the poem expresses a general anxiety about parenting which is made more poignant with its republication after the death of the poet's wife Frances Appleton, particularly in the expression that he wants to imprison them to avoid losing them.

== Poem ==
Between the dark and the daylight,
When the night is beginning to lower,
Comes a pause in the day's occupations,
That is known as the Children's Hour.

I hear in the chamber above me
The patter of little feet,
The sound of a door that is opened,
And voices soft and sweet.

From my study I see in the lamplight,
Descending the broad hall stair,
Grave Alice, and laughing Allegra,
And Edith with golden hair.

A whisper, and then a silence:
Yet I know by their merry eyes
They are plotting and planning together
To take me by surprise.

A sudden rush from the stairway,
A sudden raid from the hall!
By three doors left unguarded
They enter my castle wall!

They climb up into my turret
O'er the arms and back of my chair;
If I try to escape, they surround me;
They seem to be everywhere.

They almost devour me with kisses,
Their arms about me entwine,
Till I think of the Bishop of Bingen
In his Mouse-Tower on the Rhine!

Do you think, o blue-eyed banditti,
Because you have scaled the wall,
Such an old mustache as I am
Is not a match for you all!

I have you fast in my fortress,
And will not let you depart,
But put you down into the dungeon
In the round-tower of my heart.

And there will I keep you forever,
Yes, forever and a day,
Till the walls shall crumble to ruin,
And moulder in dust away!

== In other media ==
"The Children's Hour" was set by Charles Ives and published as number 74 in his 114 Songs collection.

The poem's title would be used by the BBC for their Children's Hour radio programming block, broadcast from 1922 to 1964. Lines from the poem are recited in the film "A Year in Mooring", aka "Hide Away", a 2011 psychological drama film starring Josh Lucas.
