= 159–161 Fore Street =

Historic house in Portland, Maine

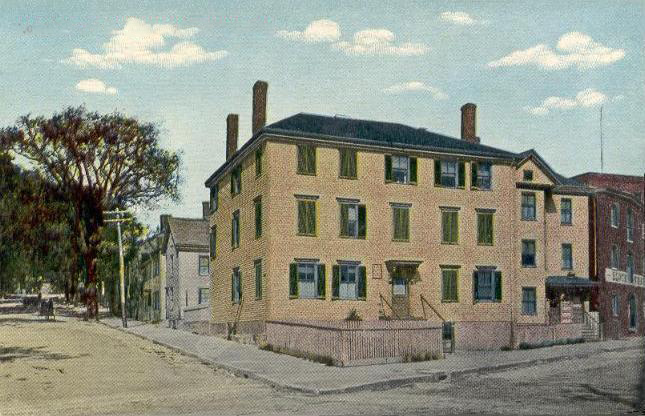
- The home pictured c. 1910
- Interactive map of the 159–161 Fore Street area
- Alternative names: The Stephenson Home

General information
- Location: Portland, Maine, U.S., 159–161 Fore Street
- Coordinates: 43.6606°N 70.2481°W
- Completed: 1784
- Demolished: 1955 (71 years ago)

Technical details
- Floor count: 3

159–161 Fore Street (also known as The Stephenson Home) was a residential building in Portland, Maine, United States. The building, which stood at the corner of Fore Street and Hancock Street in the Old Port, was notable as the birthplace of poet Henry Wadsworth Longfellow in 1807. It was built in 1784, when the city was part of Massachusetts. Longfellow did not grow up in the home. It was originally the home of Captain Samuel Stephenson, uncle of Longfellow via Stephenson's wife, Abigail.

Because of the building's connections with the famous writer, the International Longfellow Society attempted to prevent the demolition of the house with a fundraising effort but was ultimately unsuccessful. The structure was demolished in 1955. Today, it is the site of a Residence Inn by Marriott, and a boulder on the sidewalk indicates the site's connection to Longfellow.

== Gallery ==
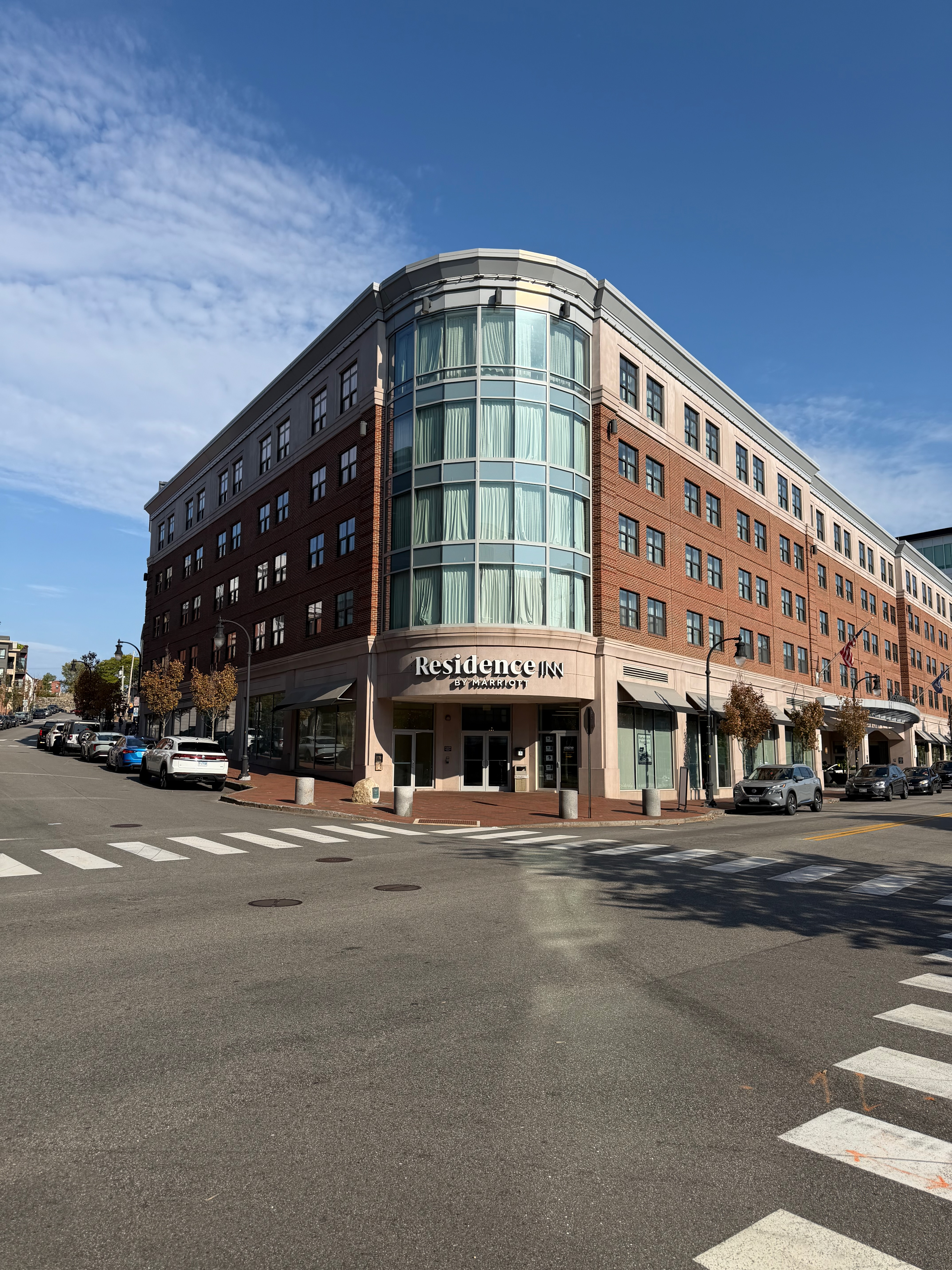
The location in 2025

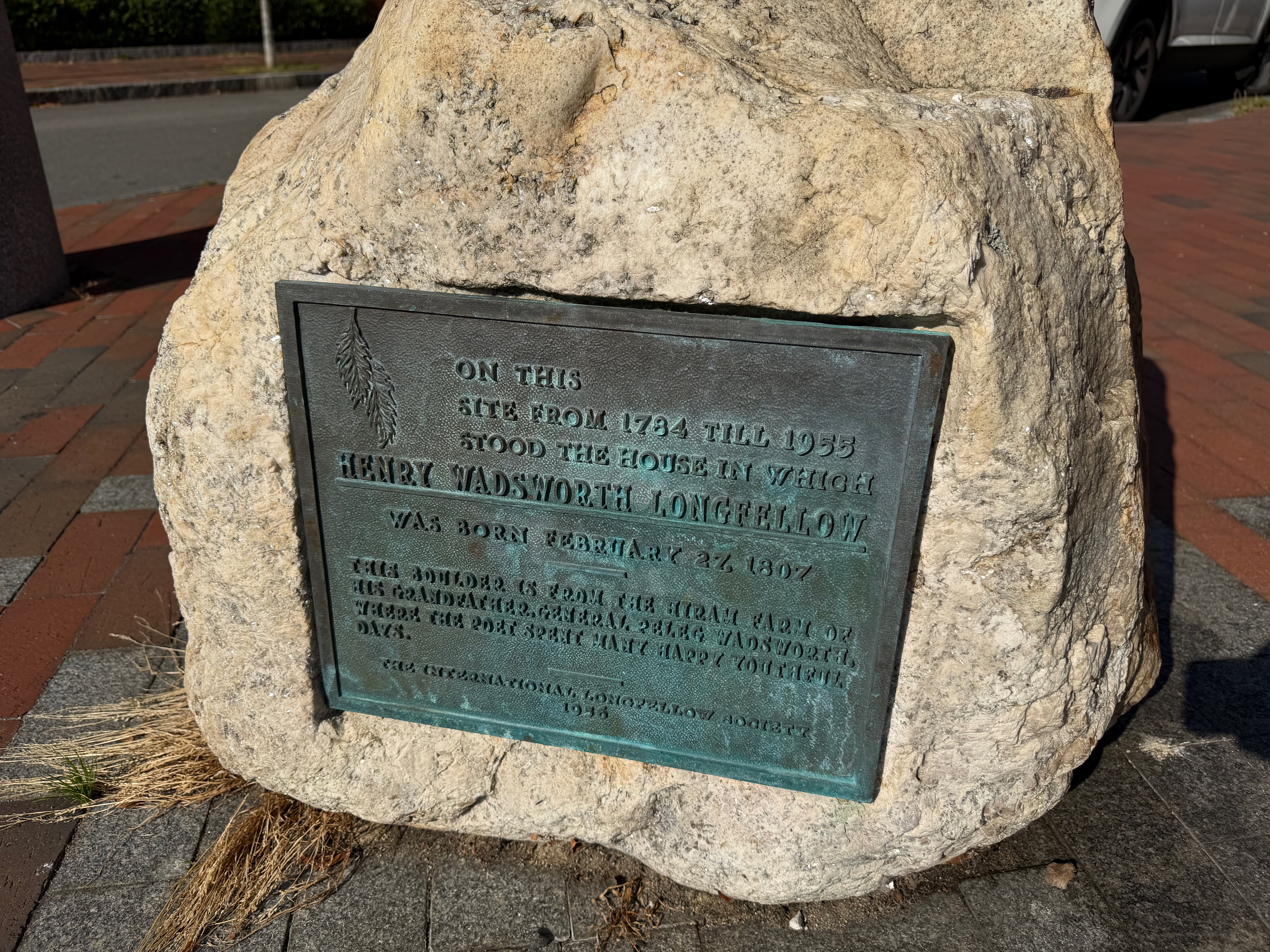
Stone marker at the corner of Fore Street and Hancock Street
