= Mary King Longfellow =

American painter (1852–1945)

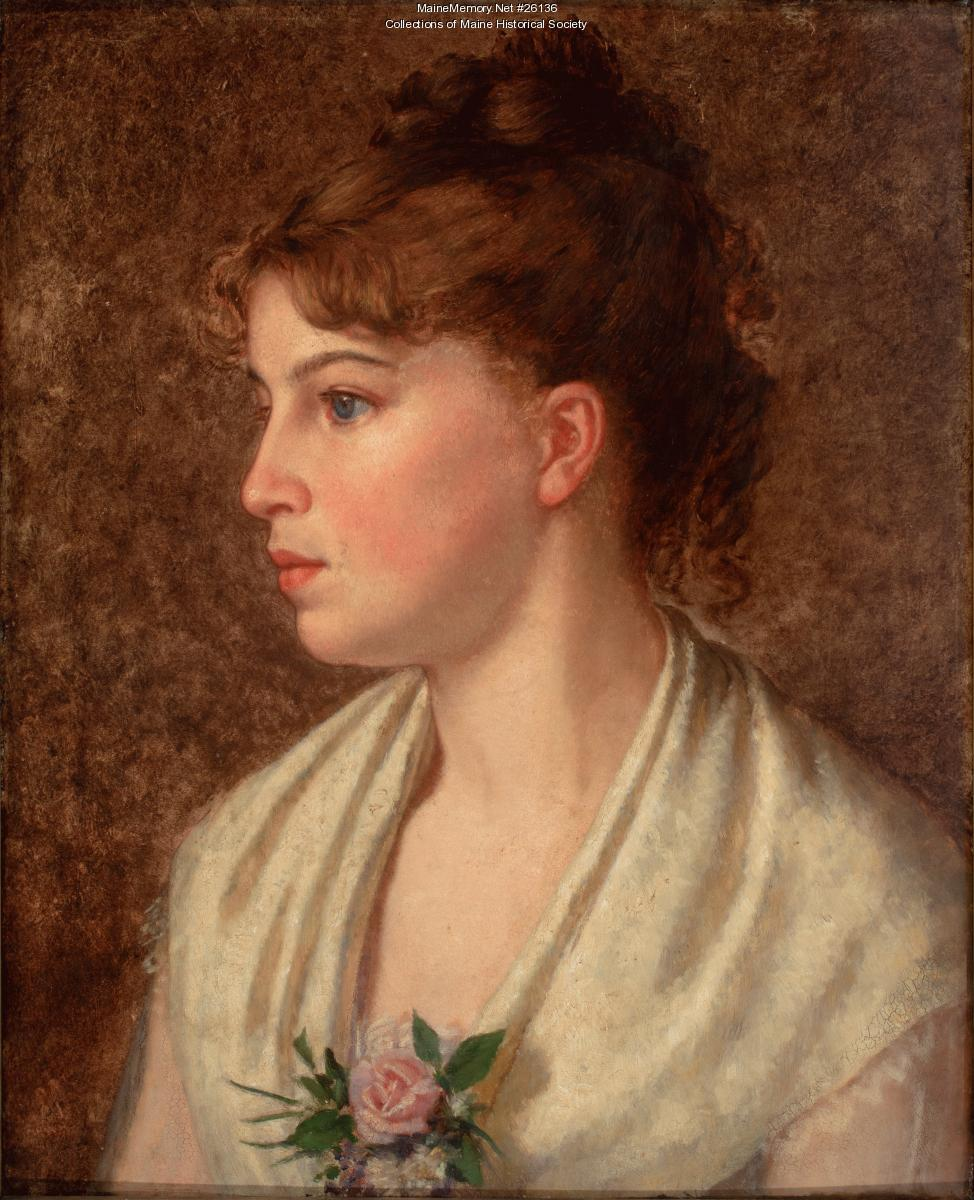
- Portrait of Longfellow ca. 1870
- Born: October 6, 1852; Westbrook, Maine, US
- Died: September 17, 1945 (aged 92); Portland, Maine, US
- Resting place: Evergreen Cemetery (Portland, Maine)
- Education: School of the Museum of Fine Arts, Boston
- Known for: Landscape painting
- Movement: Impressionism, Realism

Mary King Longfellow (October 6, 1852 – September 17, 1945) was an American landscape painter from Maine. She exhibited her work at the Art Institute of Chicago, Boston Art Club, Metropolitan Museum of Art, Pennsylvania Academy of the Fine Arts, and Portland Society of Art. She was a niece of poet Henry Wadsworth Longfellow.

== Life and career ==
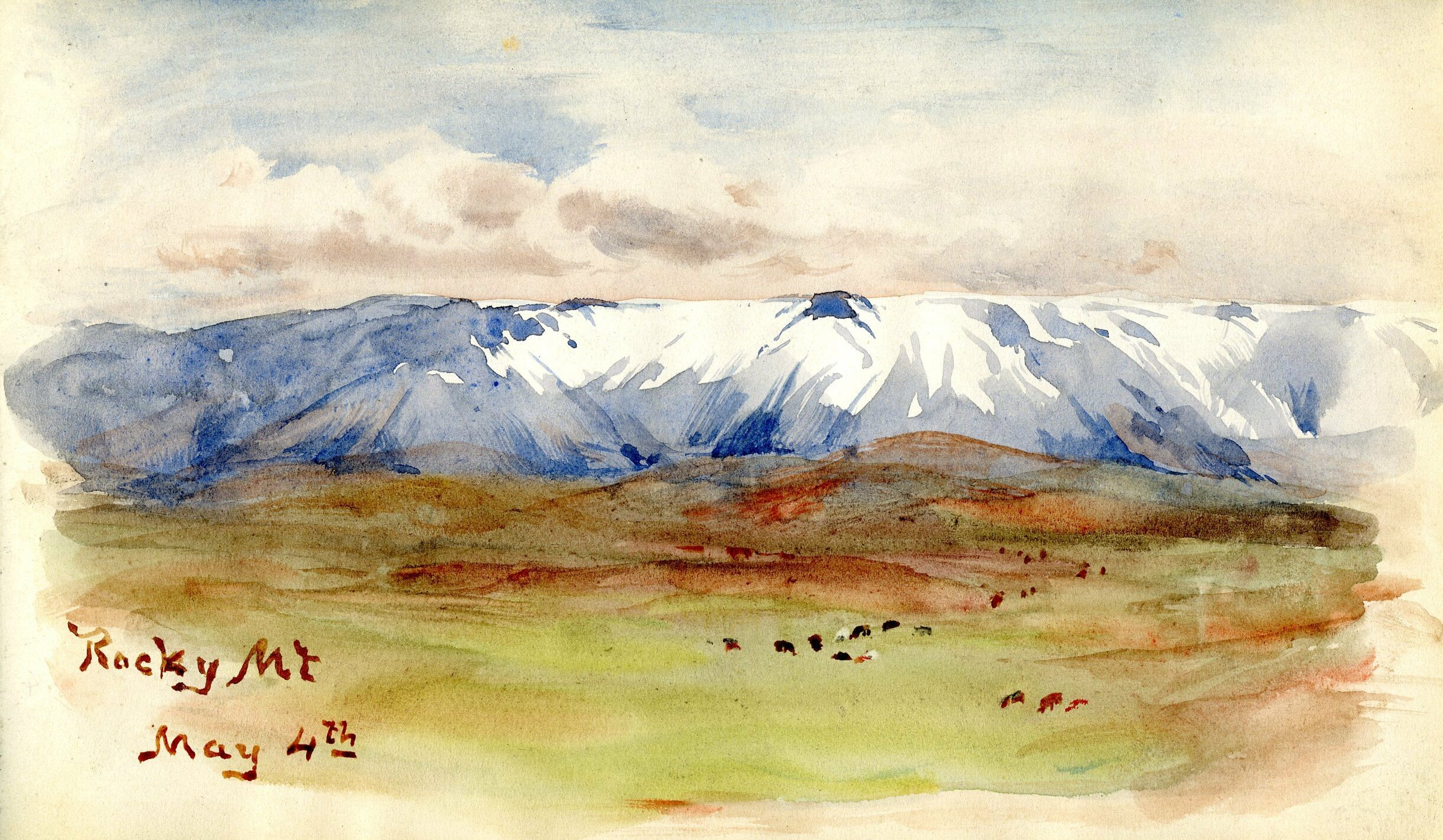
Longfellow's watercolor of a Rocky Mountains landscape, May 4, 1885

Longfellow was born on October 6, 1852, to Elizabeth Clapp Porter Longfellow and Alexander Wadsworth Longfellow Sr., an engineer and brother of the famed poet Henry Wadsworth Longfellow. She was born on the family's farm in Westbrook, Maine. As a child, she enjoyed drawing and watercoloring and accompanied her artist-cousin Ernest Wadsworth Longfellow and his wife Harriet Spelman Longfellow to Europe in 1876. With encouragement from her family, Longfellow attended the Museum of Fine Arts School of Drawing and Painting in 1878 and then studied under Ross Sterling Turner, a respected Boston painter of the American Impressionist movement, from 1884 to 1889.

Longfellow painted mostly in watercolors and often en plein air, depicting landscapes and seascapes of coastal Maine and utilizing a blend of realism and impressionism. She exhibited her paintings at the Art Institute of Chicago, Boston Art Club, Metropolitan Museum of Art, Pennsylvania Academy of the Fine Arts, American Watercolor Society, and the Portland Society of Art. In a 1981 exhibit of Women Pioneers in Maine Art, the Joan Whitney Payson Gallery called her "Portland’s best known [nineteenth-century] female painter". The Maine Historical Society, the Monhegan Museum, and other museum collections, as well as private collectors, hold her paintings.

Longfellow was active throughout her life in the art communities of Boston and Portland, Maine. On several occasions she toured Europe, Mexico, and the American South in the company of friends and family members such as cousin Alice Mary Longfellow, sister Lucia Wadsworth Longfellow Barrett, brother Alexander Wadsworth Longfellow Jr., or lifelong friend and fellow artist Catherine Talbot. Longfellow's other interests included photography, sailing, shooting, sewing, writing poetry, and performing on stage. She kept a lifelong diary.

Longfellow was a lifelong resident of Portland and died at home there on September 17, 1945, at the age of 92. She was buried at the Evergreen Cemetery in Portland. She was the closest surviving relative of Henry Wadsworth Longfellow at the time of her death.
