= Ernest Wadsworth Longfellow =

American painter

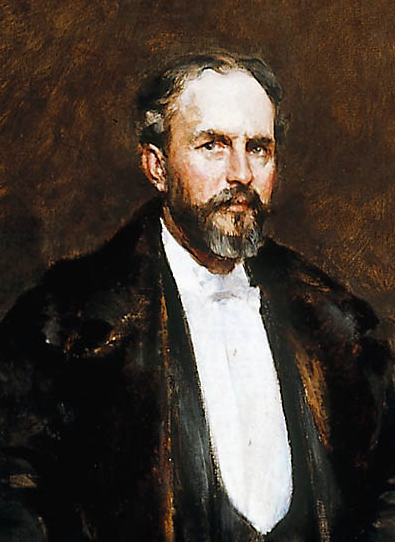
- Portrait of Longfellow by Julian Russell Story
- Born: November 23, 1845; Cambridge, Massachusetts, U.S.
- Died: November 24, 1921 (aged 76); Boston, Massachusetts, U.S.
- Education: Harvard College
- Father: Henry Wadsworth Longfellow
- Relatives: Alice Mary Longfellow (sister); Stephen Longfellow (grandfather); Mary King Longfellow (niece)

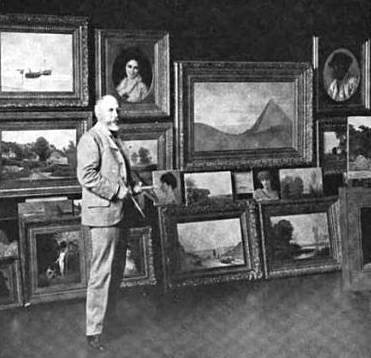
Portrait of Ernest Longfellow, c. early 20th century

Ernest Wadsworth Longfellow (1845–1921) was an American artist in Boston and New York. He was the son of poet Henry Wadsworth Longfellow.

== Biography ==
Ernest Longfellow was born in Cambridge, Massachusetts, and raised at Craigie House. He was the second of six children, including his younger sister Alice Mary Longfellow. Ernest later recalled that his father was an active guide in his childhood: "It was always to my father that we went in our childish troubles".

Educated at Harvard College, he passed the winters of 1865 and 1866 in Paris in work and study, and the summers of 1876 and 1877 in Villiers-le-Bel under Thomas Couture. He married Harriet "Hattie" Spelman in 1868. An 1874 newspaper described him "as a slender, delicate young man, an artist of talent, great at ten-pins, and tip-top at gunning."

His professional life has been spent in Boston, with frequent visits to Europe. In the 1870s he kept a studio on West Street. He exhibited at the National Academy of Design in 1871 and 1875; the Williams & Everett gallery in Boston in 1875; the 1876 Philadelphia Exposition; and Boston's Museum of Fine Arts and the St. Botolph Club in 1880. He belonged to the Boston Art Club. He moved to New York around the turn of the century.

He died in November 1921 at the Hotel Touraine in Boston. The funeral was held from the Craigie House and services were conducted by the Rev. Samuel A. Eliot. Longfellow bequeathed around fifty-five paintings from his collection to the Museum of Fine Arts, Boston, including works by Jacopo Bassano, John Constable, Thomas Couture, Luca Giordano, and others.

== Image gallery ==
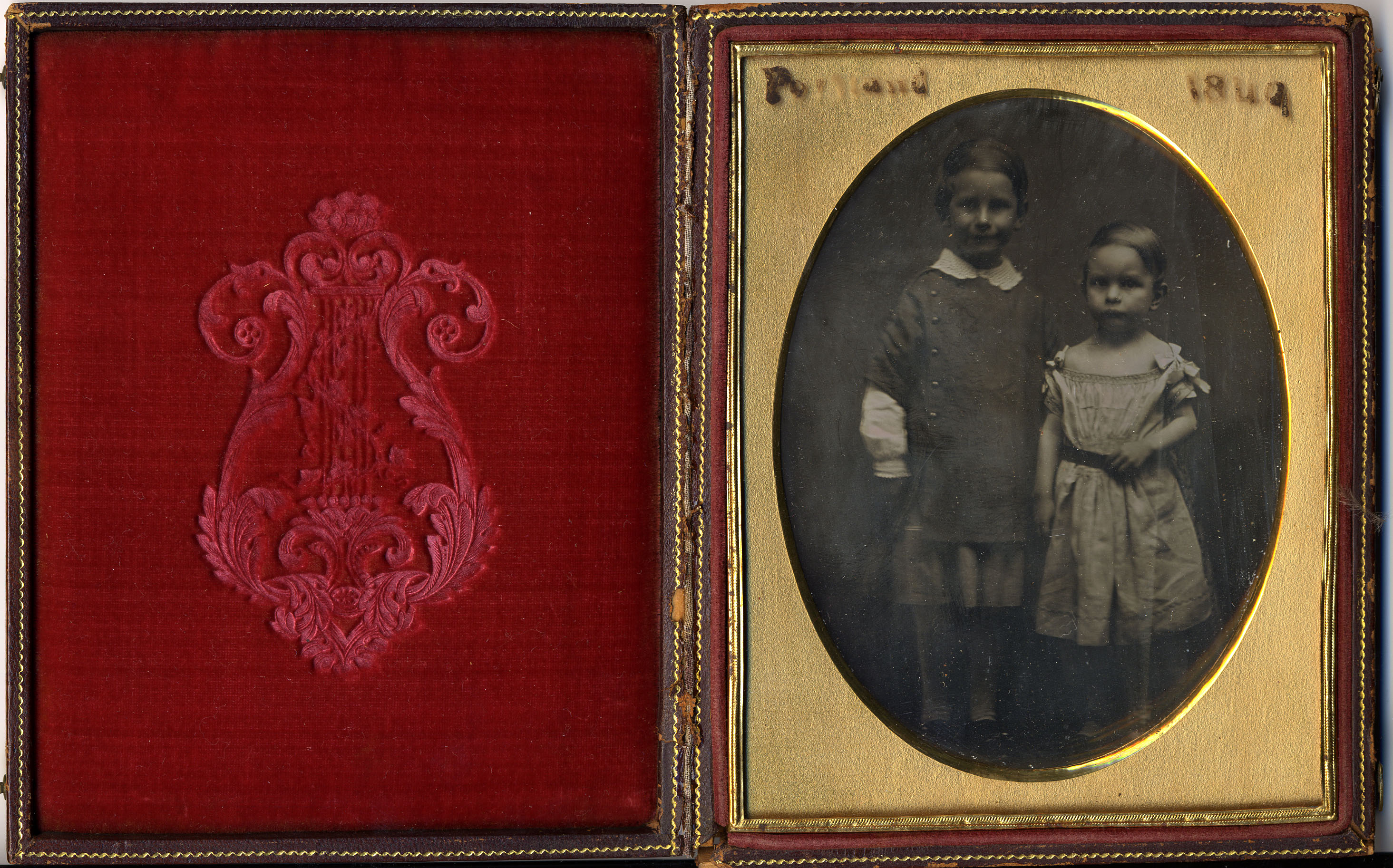
Portrait of Charley Longfellow (left) and Erny Longfellow (right), 1849.

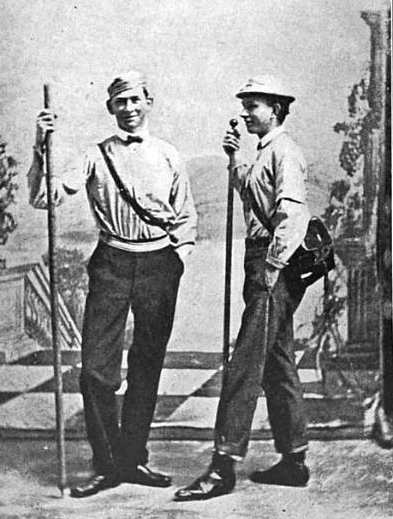
Portrait of Ernest Longfellow and Frederick Crowninshield

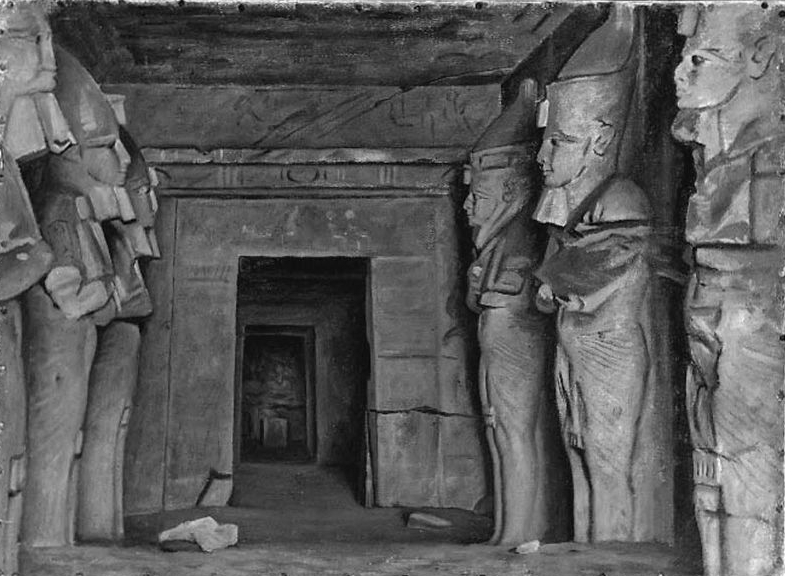
Interior of Temple of Rameses II at Abu-Simbel, by E. Longfellow (Museum of Fine Arts, Boston)

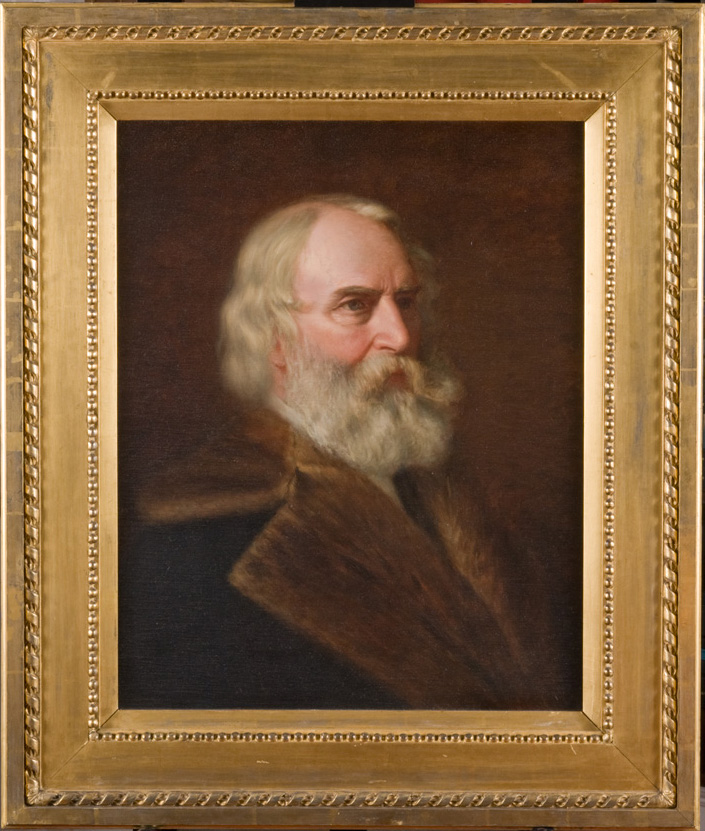
Portrait of H.W. Longfellow by his son, Ernest, 1886

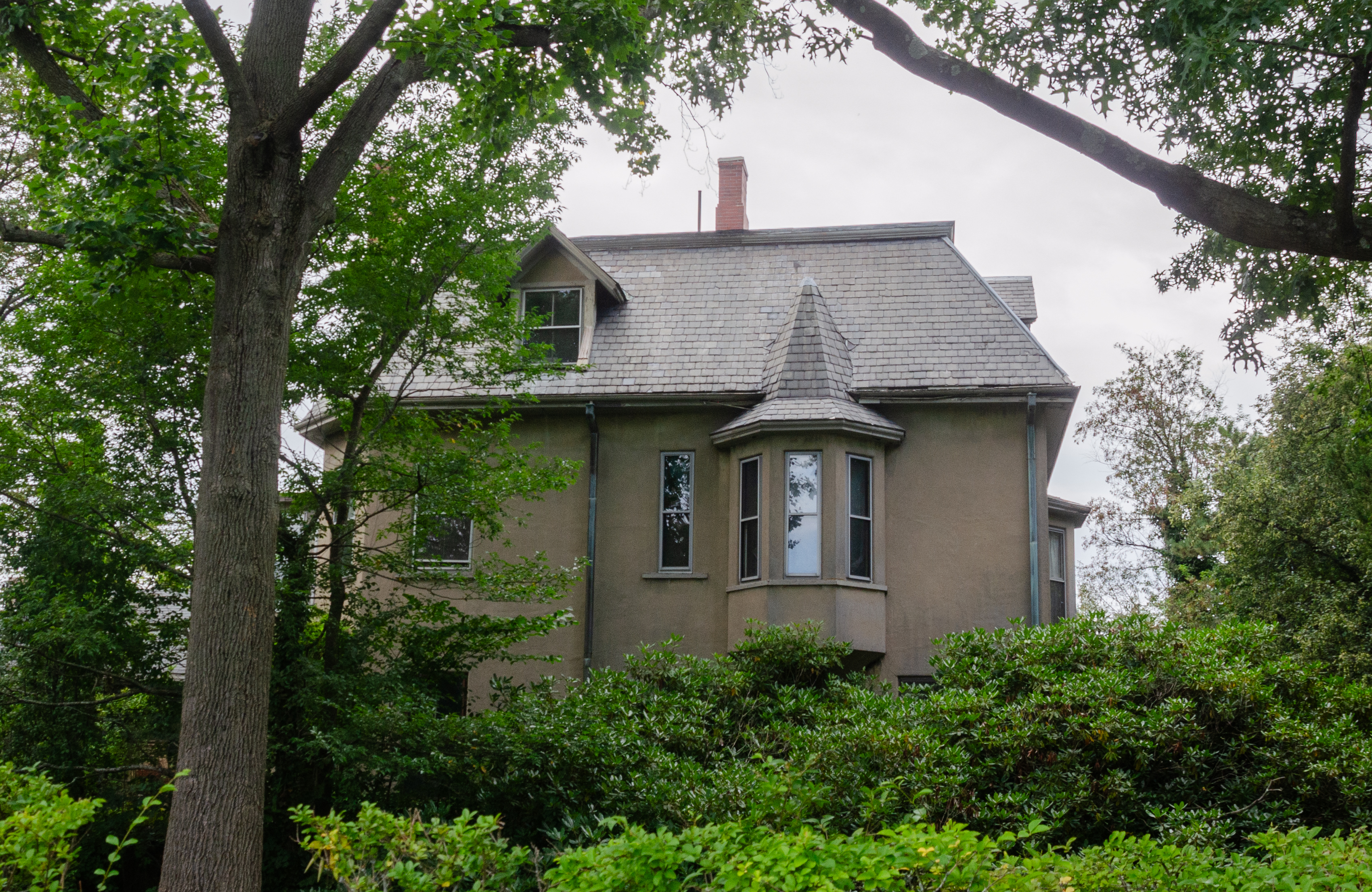
Longfellow's house in Cambridge, designed by Peabody & Stearns
