= Poems on Slavery =

1842 collection of poems by Henry Wadsworth Longfellow

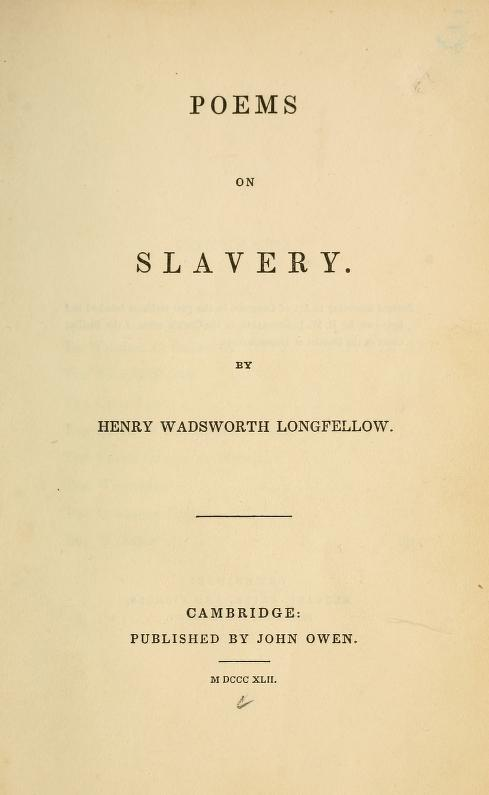
- Author: Henry Wadsworth Longfellow
- Publication date: 1842
- Text: Poems on Slavery at Wikisource

Poems on Slavery is a collection of poems by American poet Henry Wadsworth Longfellow in support of the United States anti-slavery efforts. With one exception, the collection of poems were written at sea by Longfellow in October 1842. The poems were reprinted as anti-slavery tracts two different times during 1843. Longfellow, very conscious of his public persona, published the poems even though he feared it would hurt him commercially. At the time of publication reviews were mixed, but more recently critics (now less bothered by what was earlier done away with as mere sentimentality) have begun to appreciate the collection again, for its political message and for its rhetorical strategies.

== Contents ==
- "To William E. Channing"

This poem serve as a dedication to the book and is addressed to William Ellery Channing. It is written in common meter with five stanzas.

- "The Slave's Dream"

This poem speaks about how a slave sees his home land in his memories, where he is a king.

- "The Good Part"

This poem tells of how a woman gives her life and fortune to the abolition of slavery.

- "The Slave in the Dismal Swamp"

A poem about a hunted slave hiding in the Great Dismal Swamp while he hears the hounds baying in the distance. It has six stanzas.

- "The Slave Singing at Midnight"

This poem is about a lonely slave singing from the Psalms of David.

- "The Witnesses"

This poem is representing a sunken ship of slaves on the bottom of the ocean as a witness to the slave trade.

- "The Quadroon Girl"

Poem in twelve stanzas, common meter, about a slave owner who, after raping his maid, sells his own daughter, a quadroon girl, to a slaver who takes her as his sexual slave.

- "The Warning" (written before his trip to Europe)

Longfellow speaks to the United States anticipating the violence to come, and likens the slaves to the Biblical Samson.

== Composition and publication ==
Many factors that helped influence Longfellow to compose Poems on Slavery. As a young man he read Benjamin Lundy's Genius of Universal Emancipation in his father's library. He considered writing a drama on the subject of Toussaint l'Ouverture so "that I may do something in my humble way for the great cause of Negro emancipation". Charles Sumner wished Longfellow would devise verses on slavery; Sumner wrote to Longfellow encouraging him to "write some stirring words that shall move the whole land". Longfellow traveled to Europe for six months in 1842 for his health. In October, before he set sail back home from England, he wrote to Charles Sumner from Charles Dickens's study and mentioned that Dickens's new book, American Notes, had a chapter on slavery. Longfellow wrote the poems soon to be collected as Poems on Slavery that month while on the return voyage to the United States, which fulfilled Sumner's request. Of the eight poems, seven were written while Longfellow was confined to his cabin during a fifteen-day storm. He envisioned his poems during the sleepless nights and then wrote them in the morning. When Longfellow returned home he added a poem he had written previously, and published the eight poems in a 30-page pamphlet.

The poem "The Good Part" was deemed inappropriate, without any type of explanation, for reprinting in Longfellow's Poems on Slavery, by the New England Anti-slavery Tract Association in 1843. In January 1843, Longfellow corresponded with Rufus Wilmot Griswold about reviewing his Poems on Slavery in Graham's Magazine. Griswold wrote to Longfellow that George Rex Graham objected to publishing the title of Longfellow's work, and the magazine made no mention of the poems. In December 1843, Elihu Burritt requested Longfellow's permission to print some of his Poems on Slavery as tracts. In 1845, Poems on Slavery was omitted from Longfellow's collected Poems due to his worry that they could ruin sales in the Southern and Western states.

=== Longfellow's correspondence regarding the poems ===
Longfellow sent several letters and copies of the poems to friends and family. In a letter to Henry Russell Cleveland in November 1842, Longfellow told of how he had written the poems on his way home and "shall not dare to send them to you in Cuba, for fear of having you seized as an Abolitionist". In December 1842, Longfellow sent a letter to John Forster with a copy of the poems. Longfellow wanted to see the how society would respond to the poems and wanted to add more later. A letter that Longfellow wrote to William Plumer Jr discussed how he wrote his poems in a kind spirit. Longfellow sent a letter to his father, Stephen Longfellow, in January 1843, discussing how he thought the poems made an impression. He wrote Ferdinand Freiligrath in January 1843 to let him know that he had used one or two of the wild animals from his menagerie for the poem Slaves Dream. Longfellow wrote to George Lunt that he was "sorry you find so much to gainsay in my Poems on Slavery" and spoke about his beliefs by using an article by William Ware from the Christian Examiner. Longfellow received many letters about his poems and some people even regretted that Longfellow had written them. Longfellow said his feelings prompted him to write about such things and that he had no regrets about writing them. Longfellow refused to speak at antislavery rallies, though John Greenleaf Whittier attempted to get him to run as a candidate for an antislavery party for Congress. Longfellow felt the apparent political nature of the Poems on Slavery was not something he wished to do again.

== Reviews ==
The book received attention due to it being such a controversial topic and Longfellow's notability. Margaret Fuller, editor of The Dial, reviewed Longfellow's poems in her magazine. She called it "the thinnest of all Mr. Longfellow's thin books; spirited and polished, like its forerunners; but the topic would warrant a deeper tone". In 1843 John Forster wrote a lengthy review of slavery and Longfellow's poems in the English magazine The Examiner. Forster said about Longfellow's poems: "An excellent feeling predominates throughout them, and much graphic power is displayed in the descriptions. Admirable, and most picturesque is this which follows." In May 1843, Longfellow wrote a review of his Poems on Slavery to Isaac Appleton Jewett in a personal letter. Longfellow spoke of how the poems had favorable reception from people, and how he thought that they were "so mild that even a slaveholder might read them without losing his appetite for breakfast".

== Legacy ==
Even though Poems on Slavery are considered mild today and lacked widespread recognition, the poems are still in print today along with his other poems. Janet Harris, in 1978, remarked on the courage it must have taken for a man like Longfellow, who took such great interest in the public perception, to publish these controversial poems in 1842, even at the risk of it hurting sales for his other writings. Harriet Beecher Stowe reprinted "The Quadroon Girl" in Chapter IV of A Key to Uncle Tom's Cabin. Paul K. Johnston, Professor of English at State University of New York at Plattsburgh, notes that Poems on Slavery, like Uncle Tom's Cabin, is "rehabilitated as a political statement on behalf of its marginalized characters", and has survived a half-century of formalist literacy in the 20th century that considered his and Stowe's work merely sentimental and didactic. Johnston notes also that some of Longfellow's "strategies and images" anticipate Stowe's.
