= Alice Mary Longfellow =

American philanthropist (1850–1928)

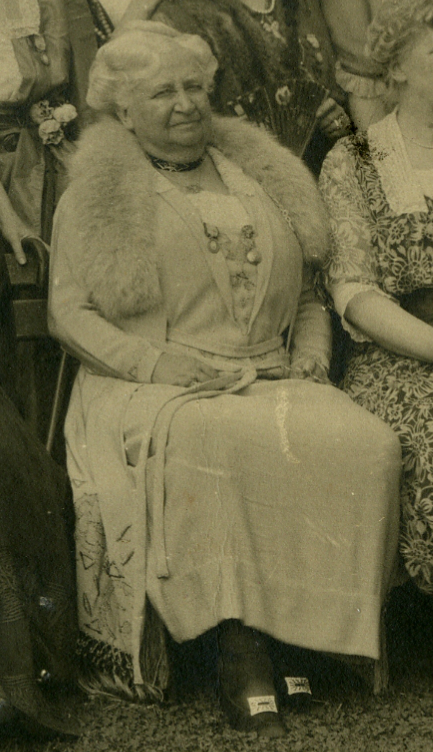
- Longfellow in 1921
- Born: September 22, 1850; Cambridge, Massachusetts
- Died: December 7, 1928 (aged 78); Cambridge, Massachusetts
- Resting place: Mount Auburn Cemetery
- Parents: Henry Wadsworth Longfellow; Frances Elizabeth Appleton
- Relatives: Ernest Wadsworth Longfellow (brother); Stephen Longfellow (grandfather)

Alice Mary Longfellow (September 22, 1850 – December 7, 1928) was an American philanthropist, preservationist, and the eldest surviving daughter of poet Henry Wadsworth Longfellow. She is referred to as "grave Alice" in her father's poem "The Children's Hour".

Longfellow was born in Cambridge, Massachusetts, and attended classes at Radcliffe College during the 1880s and 1890s, studying at Newnham College in Cambridge, England, from 1883 to 1884. She traveled frequently throughout her life, spending the majority of her time abroad in France and Italy. She met Benito Mussolini in 1927.

Alice Longfellow never married but spent several decades of her life in an intimate relationship with Frances "Fanny" Coolidge Stone, daughter of Eben F. Stone.

Longfellow died in Cambridge in 1928 in the same house where she was born.

Longfellow worked to preserve her father's home in Cambridge, now Longfellow House–Washington's Headquarters National Historic Site. She served as the Massachusetts Vice-regent of the Mount Vernon Ladies' Association and held administrative positions at Radcliffe College throughout her life. She donated significantly to multiple causes dealing with historic preservation, education, and humanitarianism, including the Audubon Society, the Tuskegee Institute, and the American Fund for French Wounded during World War I.

== Early life ==
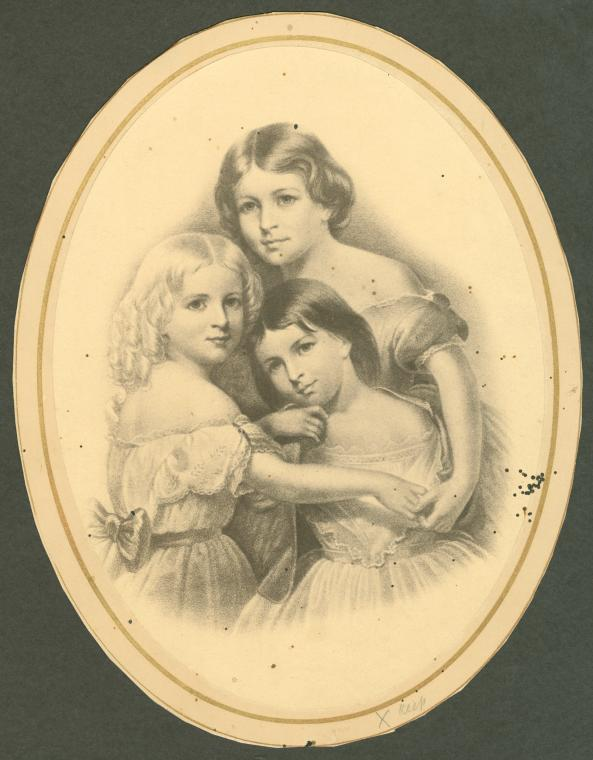
Portrait of "grave Alice" (top), "laughing Allegra" (right), and "Edith with golden hair" (left) used to illustrate Henry Wadsworth Longfellow's "The Children's Hour" circa 1859.

Alice Longfellow was born on September 22, 1850, at "half past six" in the morning, "with the setting of the moon and the rising of the sun! and all the splendors of the dawn!" to Henry Wadsworth Longfellow and Frances "Fanny" Elizabeth Appleton Longfellow, the daughter of Nathan Appleton, the Boston industrialist, and Maria Gold Appleton.

Longfellow was christened on George Washington's birthday at which "she behaved beautifully." Her parents made this date choice intentionally because of Longfellow's birth in Washington's former headquarters.

Her mother Fanny wrote of the baby Alice: "It is a great laughter and has a very expressive little face already, with dark blue eyes and an inclination to look like Henry, I think."

Longfellow led a privileged childhood growing up in an affluent Cambridge family home. Her mother records of young Alice that, "She likes to take up a book & read stories & says more cunning things than can be remembered" and that "she is an impetuous little woman full of character & originality." Longfellow learned very quickly in her private lessons with her governess or at private schools such as Miss C. S. Lyman's School, and later Professor Williston's School, and by the age of ten her mother wrote that Alice was "so wise she is quite a companion for me."

After the death of her mother in 1861, Longfellow took on something of a caretaker role to her two younger sisters, which arguably solidified her "graveness" as described in her father's 1859 poem. One of her best friends growing up was Harriet "Hattie" Spelman who would later go on to marry Longfellow's brother, Ernest. As an example of the lifestyle Longfellow had growing up, there is a letter exchange between Henry and Alice Longfellow about Alice's "basket carriage", or horse and buggy, that Henry had given her. The letter recounts that Longfellow drove it recklessly and crashed into a post, scaring herself and the horse nearly to death.

In 1863 when she was just 12 years old Longfellow took her first trip to Maine. She went with her uncle Thomas Gold Appleton on his yacht that was named The Alice after her. This was the beginning of her long life of travel. By the time she was about 14, Henry Longfellow was already referring to his daughter Alice as "my darling runaway" as she was always gone on vacations.

Longfellow's first European tour was from May 23, 1868, to September 1, 1869, when she went with her family in celebration of Erny and Hattie's recent wedding. Longfellow would have been 18 years old during most of the trip. The family members on the trip were Longfellow's father, her maternal aunts and Uncle Samuel Longfellow, her Uncle Tom Appleton, her siblings and new sister-in-law, and the family governess Hannah Davie. They visited England, Scotland, France, Switzerland, Austria, Belgium, Germany, and Italy.

When Longfellow turned 21 years old, her father gave her the share of her mother's estate that had been willed to her, totaling $131,755.45, which would allow Longfellow financial independence for the rest of her life.

== Philanthropic career ==
Longfellow led a career, from the time she was about 28 years old in 1879 until her death 50 years later, that was focused on the preservation of American antiquities, promoting educational opportunities for disenfranchised groups, and supporting the Allied forces during World War I.

=== Radcliffe College ===
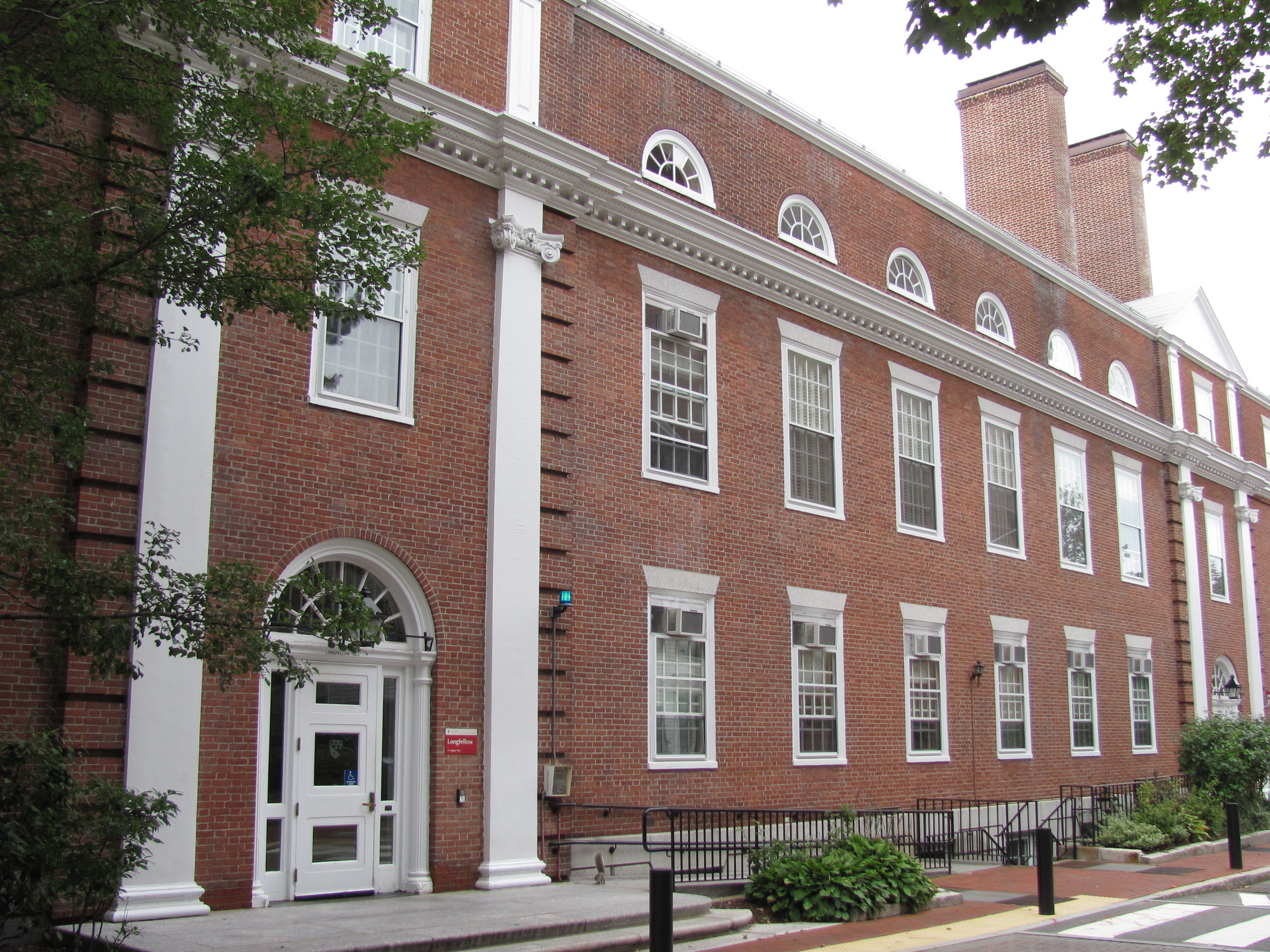
Longfellow Hall, now part of Harvard Graduate School of Education

In January 1879 Longfellow joined The Society for the Collegiate Instruction of Women, a committee of seven women, of which she was the youngest at just 28 years old. This group worked to establish the Harvard Annex for women to have classes taught by Harvard professors. Longfellow was the treasurer of the Annex from 1883 to 1891, a special student from 1879 to 1881 and 1884 to 1890, and a member of the governing board in various capacities until her death in 1928. The institution later became known as Radcliffe College, now part of Harvard University.

Longfellow held several early commencement ceremonies for Radcliffe in the Longfellow House library, as well as regular Memorial Day parties that included tea in the formal garden. She shared her love of travel by creating a traveling fellowship for Radcliffe graduates. She donated books and supplies for the institution's first library and enlisted her cousin Alexander to design several of its first buildings and, in 1899, paid for him to redesign Fay House, the first building owned by the young college. When Harvard officially acquired the organization in 1893, President Charles William Eliot considered naming it Longfellow College after the poet but his daughter, who sat on the founding committee, refused and suggested they should find another namesake who had been more committed to the education of women.

She continued her legacy by donating money for Longfellow Hall, built in 1930, and currently used for the Harvard Graduate School of Education. Longfellow was well loved by the Radcliffe community. In 1905 a tribute program was held for her on her 55th birthday with a poem of praise by Alice Stone Blackwell, the daughter of women's rights activist Lucy Stone, and the presentation of a loving cup.

=== Mount Vernon Ladies' Association ===
Longfellow's love of Washington was likely sparked by growing up in Washington's first headquarters and with the influence of her father and his poetry, such as "To A Child," which references the significance of Washington's presence in the Longfellow household. By the age of 28 she had already become involved with the Mount Vernon Ladies' Association, the group that works to preserve George Washington's home in Virginia, Mount Vernon, for which she would serve as the Massachusetts vice-regent for 48 years from 1880 to her death in 1928. Her record service still stands unmatched today.

Longfellow became so involved with the Association that she personally bought numerous rare books such as Meditations and Contemplations, complete with George Washington's mother's signature inside it, to reconstruct Washington's collection that had dispersed after his death. Her crowning achievement was when, in 1904, she bought Washington's secretary bookcase with her own money to put in its rightful place in his study, the room which she had a particular interest in preserving.

=== World War I aid ===
Longfellow was active during World War I in providing aid to the Allies. She donated to the American Fund for French Wounded in 1919, the American Ambulance Hospital in Paris from 1915 to 1916, the Layette Fund from 1915 to 1919, the Serbian Hospital Fund in 1917, the American Memorial Hospital at Rheims from 1919 to 1928, the American Ouvrior Funds from 1918 to 1928, and the American Committee for War Relief in Florence in 1916. Longfellow also corresponded with the Paris-based Committee for Men Blinded in Battle.

In 1915, Longfellow donated enough to the American Ambulance Field Service to have Ambulance No. 88 named in her honor. The ambulance saw service in France and Belgium from 1915 to the summer of 1917, when it was at first deemed as irreparable. The car survived, however, and is on display at the Owls Head Transportation Museum, where it is kept in running condition.

=== Miscellaneous memberships and affiliations ===
Longfellow was a member of the Audubon Society from 1886 to 1915, the American Association for Highway Improvement in 1912, the Cambridge School Committee from 1887 to 1892, the Daughters of the American Revolution in 1901, the Massachusetts Historical Society in 1916, and the National Geographic Society in 1919.

Longfellow was also a governing member of The Society for the Preservation of New England Antiquities, today known as Historic New England from its inception in 1910 until her death. Her cousin and good friend William Sumner Appleton Jr. was the founder of the Society.

In addition, Longfellow provided scholarship funds for students at the Hampton Institute and the Tuskegee Institute. She also donated money to schools for the blind.

== Preserving her father's legacy ==
After her father's death in 1882, Longfellow published a four-page sketch of the poet titled "Longfellow in Home Life". In it, she described his "consideration and thoughtfulness for others" and "quick sense of humor" with "no line of demarcation between his life and his poetry". Further, she noted he "was always full of reserve, and never talked much about himself or his work, even to his family". Longfellow was active throughout her life in promoting her father's legacy as the first great American poet. She did this not just by preserving his home in Cambridge, but also through making personal connections in his name all over the world.

=== Poets' Corner ===
In 1884 Alice and her sister Anne Longfellow saw the dedication of their father's bust in Poets' Corner in Westminster Abbey in London. Henry Wadsworth Longfellow is the only American-born American to have such an honor. Alice commissioned the bust's artist, Thomas Brock, to make an exact replica of the bust, completed in 1885, which still stands in the Longfellow House library today.

=== Meeting with the Ojibwe ===
In 1900 Longfellow was invited to visit the Ojibwe people in Ontario, Canada in recognition of her father's favorable representation of the tribe in The Song of Hiawatha (1855). She and her surviving siblings were made honorary members. She and her two sisters traveled to Kensington Point, Desbarats, Ontario and attended a pageant based on the book performed by members of the Garden River First Nation.

=== Longfellow House Trust ===
Alice Longfellow was the last of the poet's children to remain in the family home; she did little to alter it, with the exception of modernizing bathrooms and installing an elevator. The Longfellow House Trust was created by the surviving children of Henry Wadsworth Longfellow and their spouses in 1913, with the first indenture being signed on October 28 of that year. The purpose of the Trust was to preserve the home of their father for its historical significance so that it could remain for future generations as a monument to his life and work. The initial funds for the Trust were provided by the Longfellow children as follows:

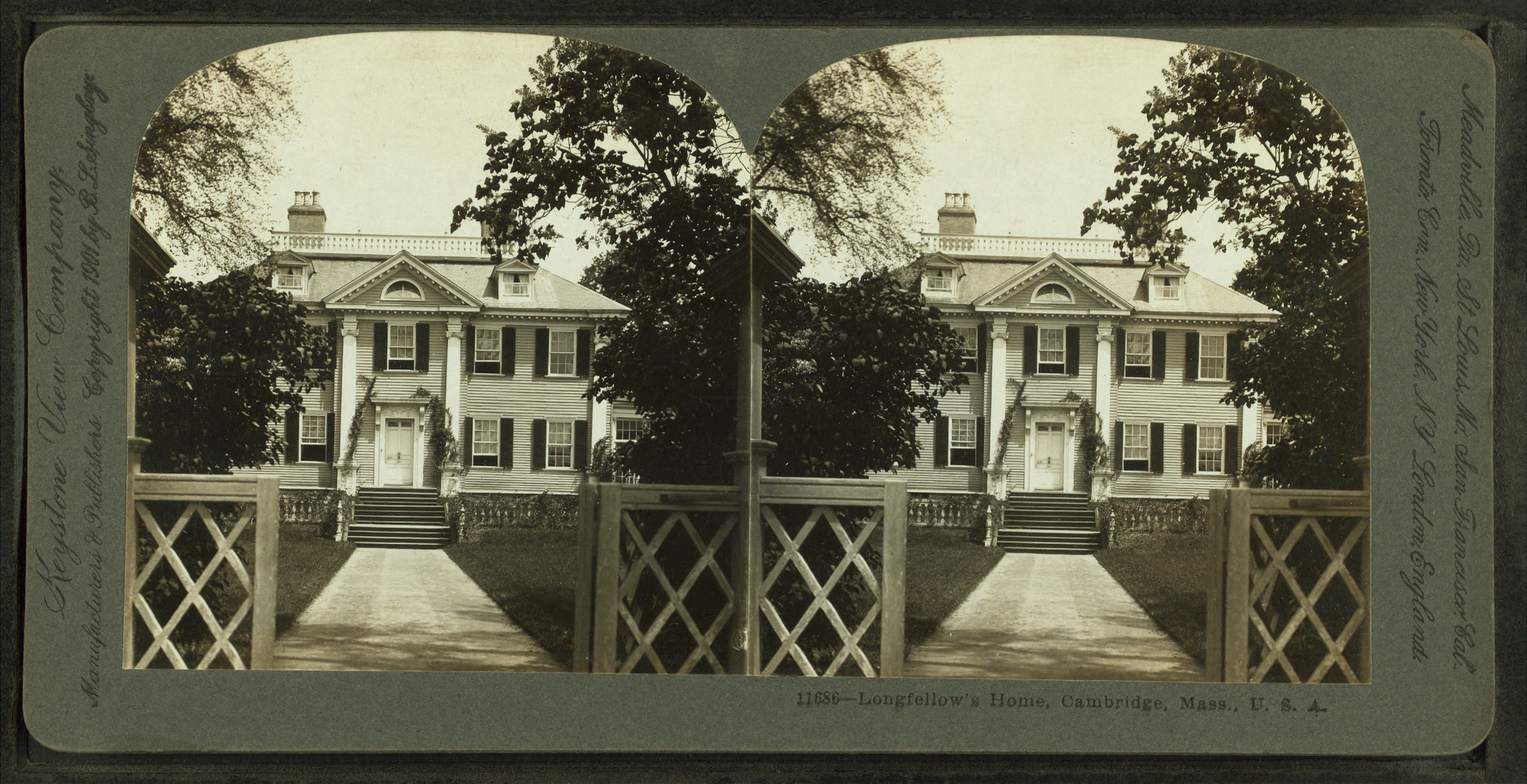
The Longfellow House circa 1859–1910.

- Anne Allegra Longfellow Thorp – $5,000.00 (1/10 of funds)
- Edith Longfellow Dana – $5,000.00 (1/10 of funds)
- Erny Wadsworth Longfellow – $10,000.00 (1/5 of funds)
- Alice Mary Longfellow – $25,000.00 (3/5 of funds)

The first indenture of the Trust also provides that Alice Longfellow will be the live-in caretaker of the house as long as she would like to. Longfellow maintained her position until her death in 1928. Her nephew, Henry Wadsworth Longfellow Dana, also received a life tenancy in the house and lived there from 1917 until his death in 1950. Dana gave public tours of the house, collected his grandfather's letters, and served as "Longfellow caretaker and archivist" during his 30-odd years of residency.

Alice Longfellow donated an additional $50,000 to the Trust in her will for the purpose of ensuring that future Longfellow descendants could live in the Longfellow House if they so desired. The Trust took care of the house until 1972 when the house was transferred by the trustees to the National Park Service so that it could become a National Historic Site.

=== Meeting with Mussolini ===
Perhaps Longfellow's most notable personal excursion is when she met with Benito Mussolini on October 24, 1927, at Palazzo Chigi and presented him with a copy of her father's translation of Dante Alighieri's Divine Comedy. Longfellow was sympathetic to the Fascist cause, writing a paper circa 1923 entitled "The Fascisti As I Saw Them" in which she praises Mussolini's work as leader of Italy.

== Personal life ==
Longfellow traveled extensively throughout her life, taking approximately a dozen separate trips abroad. She visited Canada, Portugal, Spain, Italy, Switzerland, Germany, Austria, England, Wales, Scotland, France, and Belgium. France and Italy were her most frequent destinations.

While at home in Cambridge Longfellow led an active social life. She maintained friendships with the wives of some of her father's friends, such as Elizabeth Cabot Agassiz, the wife of the natural historian and Harvard professor Louis Agassiz, and Annie Adams Fields, the wife of her father's publisher, James T. Fields of Ticknor and Fields. Also of note are her friendships with Henry Ford and Thomas Edison. It is rumored, although in no way substantiated, that it was Edison himself who convinced Longfellow to introduce electricity into her historic Cambridge home in the early 20th century.

Longfellow enjoyed learning about American history. In 1876 when she was about 25 years old she went to the Centennial International Exposition with her father and two sisters in Philadelphia for the celebration of the 100th anniversary of the signing of the Declaration of Independence.

In 1896 Longfellow held the 120th wedding anniversary of George and Martha Washington in the Longfellow House by reenacting the Washington's supposed Twelfth Night party held in 1776. The Longfellows celebrated this tradition based on the rumor that the Washingtons held their 17th wedding anniversary at the Vassall-Craigie-Longfellow House while Washington was living there as his first headquarters during the American Revolutionary War. However, even the Longfellows were not convinced of the authenticity of the story. The popular legend lives on due to a work of historical fiction called the "Diary of Dorothy Dudley". Longfellow is said to have been a member of the committee who helped to write the fictional diary.

Longfellow had close relationships with many family members, including her cousins Mary King Longfellow, a landscape painter, and Alexander Wadsworth "Waddy" Longfellow Jr., a founder of the Arts and Crafts Movement. Alice and Mary Longfellow traveled through Europe together throughout their adult lives. Longfellow consulted Waddy on modifications to her father's home in Cambridge and was also a member of the Boston Society for Arts and Crafts, a group which Waddy helped to found.

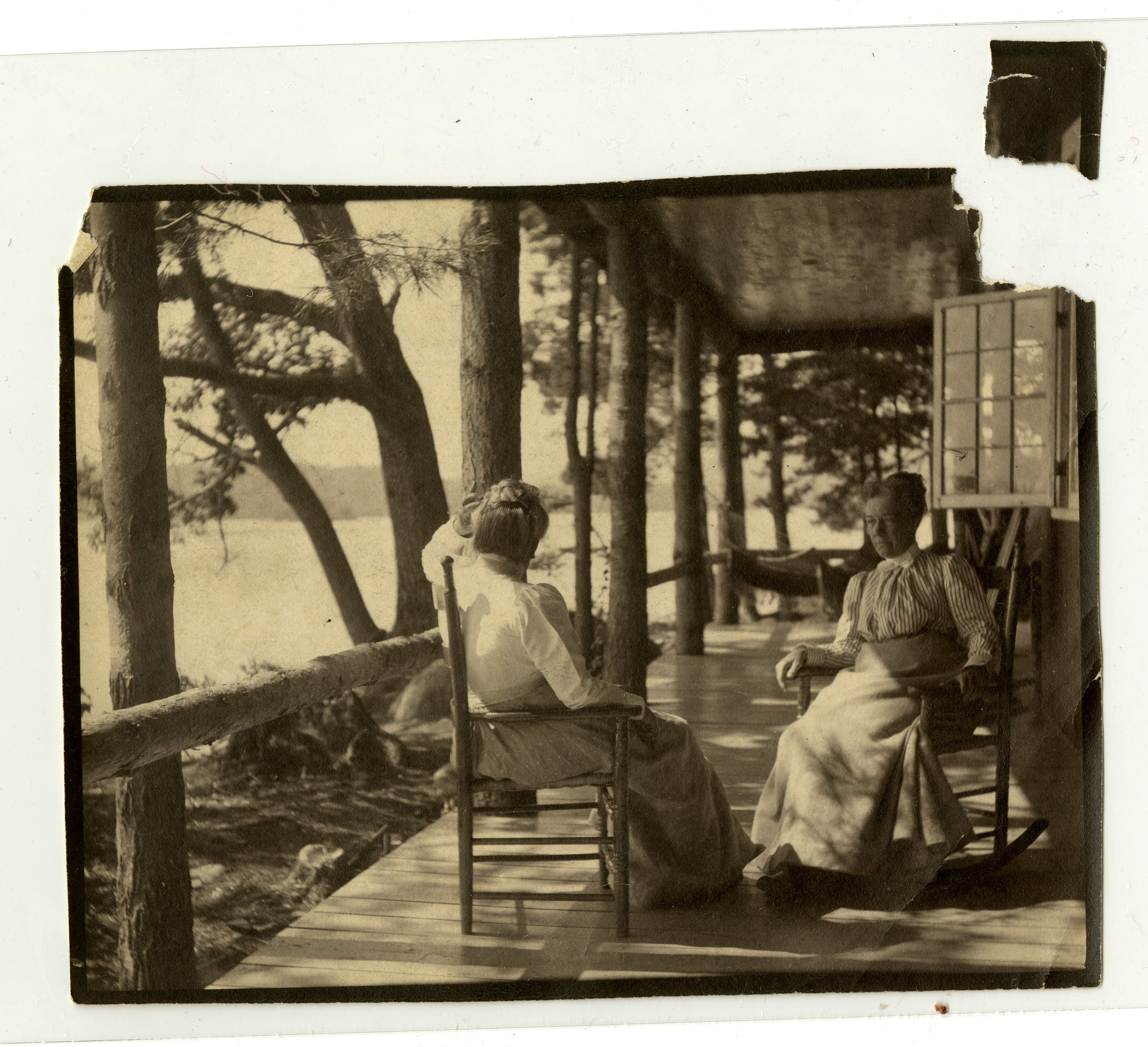
Fanny Stone and Alice Longfellow sit together aside Squam Lake in New Hampshire circa 1900.

Longfellow was independently wealthy and never needed to take a husband. Interpreters at the Longfellow House have examined information Longfellow left behind and now understand her to have been queer. She spent a great deal of time with a close female friend, Fanny Stone, daughter of Eben F. Stone, a Republican politician from Massachusetts. Longfellow and Stone frequently corresponded while Stone was living in Washington, D.C., with her father. Stone's letters reveal a strong romantic attachment to Alice and their relationship was one of the most important and significant of Longfellow's life. The pair traveled together for over forty years and Stone often visited while visiting her sister down the street. Their letters reveal a close, intimate relationship between two women who loved each other deeply.

Alice Mary Longfellow died on December 7, 1928. She was 78 years old. Her body was cremated and buried in the family plot at Mount Auburn Cemetery.

== Sources ==
- Hilen, Andrew. The Letters of Henry Wadsworth Longfellow. Cambridge, Massachusetts: The Belknap Press of Harvard University Press, 1982. Volumes I – VI.
- Historic Furnishings Report – The Longfellow House – Volume I: Administrative and Historic Information, Illustrations, and Bibliography. Division of Historic Furnishings, Harpers Ferry Center, National Park Service, 1999.
- Howells, Dorothy Elia. A Century to Celebrate Radcliffe College, 1879–1979. Cambridge, Massachusetts: Radcliffe College Alumnae Association, 1978. ISBN 0-9601774-1-8.
- McLeod, Stephen A. The Mount Vernon Ladies' Association: 150 Years of Restoring George Washington's Home. Mount Vernon, Virginia: Mount Vernon Ladies' Association, 2010. ISBN 0-931917-43-3.
- Wagenknecht, Edward. Mrs. Longfellow: Selected Letters and Journals of Fanny Appleton Longfellow (1817–1861). New York: Longmans, Green and Co., 1956.
