= Kavanagh (novel) =

1849 novel by Henry Wadsworth Longfellow

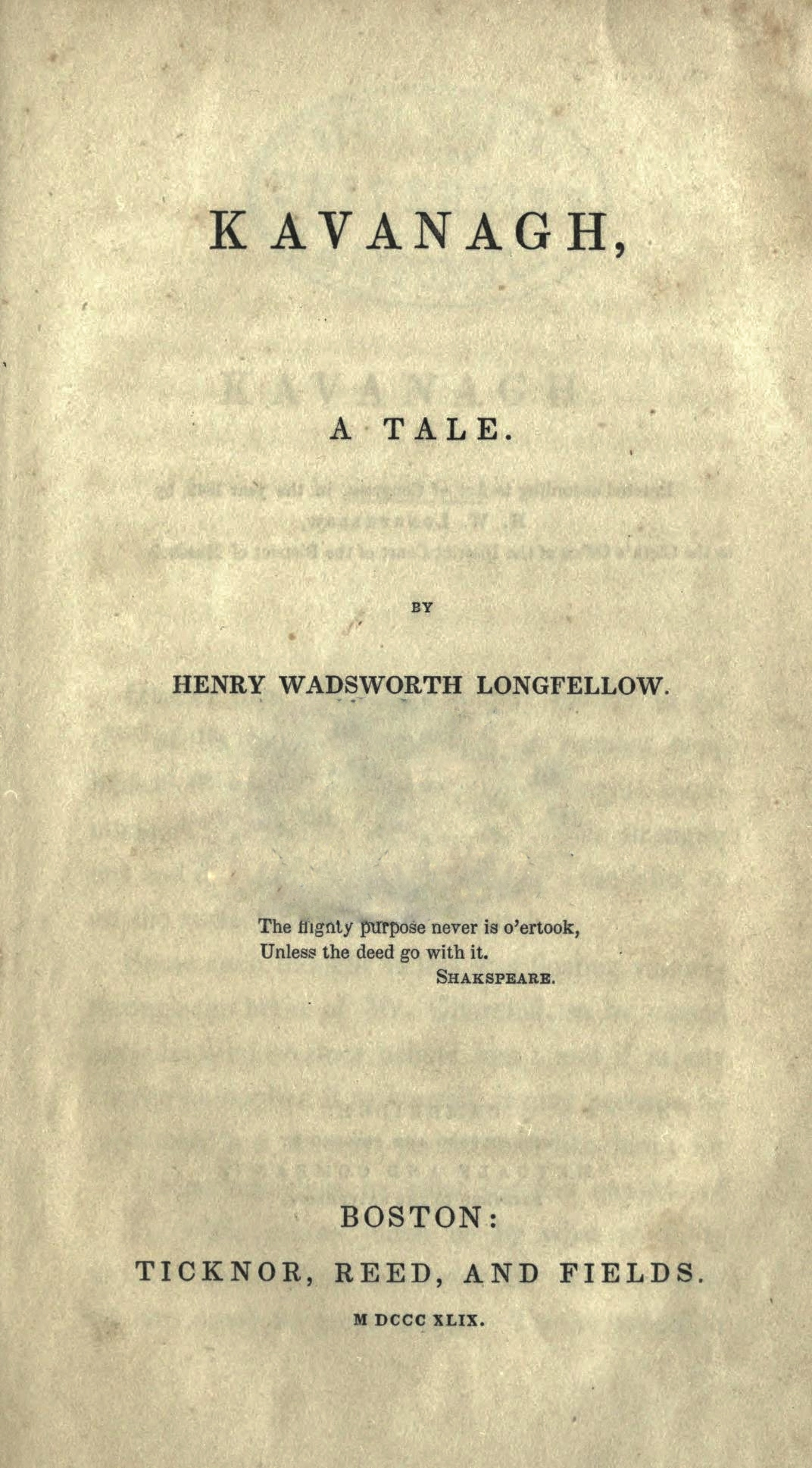
First edition title page

Kavanagh is a novel by the American poet Henry Wadsworth Longfellow.

== Overview ==
Longfellow began writing the story in 1847 and it was published in 1849. Kavanagh is the story of a country romance. Besides a character named Kavanagh, among its characters is a school teacher named Mr. Churchill, who has always planned to write a romance, but whose procrastination never allows him to start, until late in life he resigns himself to his "destiny".

Longfellow also used the novel to argue against the view, in the book propounded by a character based on Cornelius Mathews, that American literature must be entirely devoid of European influences and be exclusively national. Instead, Longfellow felt that American literature could and should be universalist, with its unique North American influences. He saw the use of European models not as imitation but as a "continuation" that Americans could be proud of.

Of the novel, Robert L. Gale writes in A Henry Wadsworth Longfellow Companion that

Kavanagh is of little value as a novel, even though Emily Dickinson […], Ralph Waldo Emerson, Nathaniel Hawthorne, and William Dean Howells, among other contemporaries, admired it greatly.

Kavanagh has also been described as a precursor of local color writing.

Lillian Faderman has used the case of two of the novel's characters, Alice and Cecilia, to explore the nature of women's relationships in Victorian America. Given that contemporaries found Longfellow's work realistic, both Longfellow and his readers seem to be familiar and comfortable with an intense and intimate affection between female friends, in this case former schoolmates about twenty years old. Though Alice and Cecilia have contrasting family backgrounds and markedly different personalities, they are in constant contact, even communicating by carrier pigeon. Eschewing the ahistorical use of the term "lesbian", which Longfellow's biographer Charles Calhoun uses of this pair, Faderman compares Longfellow's female couple to female pairs found in the works of Henry James. Longfellow describes their intensity and single-mindedness as a "rehearsal" for the marriages they will have as adults.

== Online text ==
- Etext at the University of Virginia Library
- Kavanagh: A Tale at Google Books
- Kavanagh, a tale at the Internet Archive
