= Outre-Mer =

Book by Henry Wadsworth Longfellow

Outre-Mer: A Pilgrimage Beyond the Sea is a prose collection by American poet Henry Wadsworth Longfellow. It was the first major work by Longfellow and it was inspired by his travels in Europe as a young man. The term "outre-mer" is French for "overseas".

== Overview ==
In preparation for his employment as a professor of language at his alma mater Bowdoin College, Longfellow traveled to Europe. His stay there may have inspired Outre-Mer. It is his first published literary work after previously publishing academic texts.

After Longfellow received a professorship at Harvard College, he rented a room in Cambridge, Massachusetts from Elizabeth Craigie, the widow of Andrew Craigie, who had been the first Apothecary General of the United States, in the summer of 1837. Assuming the young-looking Longfellow was a student at neighboring Harvard, Mrs. Craigie refused to board him. Longfellow convinced her that he was a faculty member, and pointed out that he was the author of Outre-Mer, which she had a copy of. The Craigie House is now the Longfellow House–Washington's Headquarters National Historic Site. When Longfellow first met his wife-to-be Fanny Appleton, she was traveling in Switzerland in 1836 with her family, including her father the industrialist Nathan Appleton. After meeting Longfellow, she wrote in her journal that she hoped he would not "pop in on us" though, she admitted "I did like his Outre-Mer".

== Publication history and reception ==
Longfellow, who was experimenting with prose writings, published the first parts of Outre-Mer in pamphlet form in the 1830s. Harper & Brothers published the completed work in two volumes in 1835 without the author's name. Longfellow traveled to Europe shortly afterward, and while in London had an English edition printed, credited only by "An American".

The book was not particularly successful. The indifferent reception, as well as his duties as a Harvard professor, prevented Longfellow from producing significant literary works until 1838, with his poem "A Psalm of Life" and his novel Hyperion. However, Longfellow's former Bowdoin College classmate Nathaniel Hawthorne enjoyed the work so much that it inspired him to rekindle their acquaintanceship. Hawthorne also offered Longfellow a copy of his recently published Twice-Told Tales.

Longfellow would later work with publishers Ticknor and Fields in Boston, which reissued Outre-Mer and most of his other early writings in the 1850s.
