= Hyperion (Longfellow novel) =

1839 book by Henry Wadsworth Longfellow

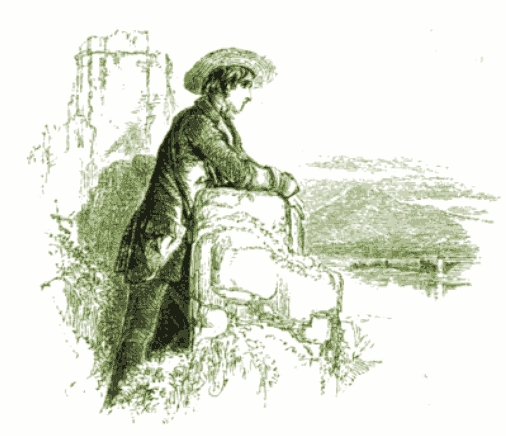
Paul Flemming, main character of Hyperion

Hyperion: A Romance is one of Henry Wadsworth Longfellow's earliest works, published in 1839. It is a prose romance which was published alongside his first volume of poems, Voices of the Night.

== Overview ==
Hyperion follows a young American protagonist named Paul Flemming as he travels through Germany. The character's wandering is partially inspired by the death of a friend. The author had also recently lost someone close to him. Longfellow's first wife, Mary Storer Potter, died in Rotterdam in the Netherlands after a miscarriage in 1836; Longfellow was deeply saddened by her death and noted in his diary: "All day I am weary and sad ... and at night I cry myself to sleep like a child."

Hyperion was inspired in part by his trips to Europe as well as his then-unsuccessful courtship of Frances Appleton, daughter of businessman Nathan Appleton. In the book, Flemming falls in love with an Englishwoman, Mary Ashburton, who rejects him.

== Publication history ==
Longfellow's first prose work, Outre-Mer (1835), was met with an indifferent reception. Its lackluster performance as well as Longfellow's commitments to his Harvard College professorship prevented him from producing significant literary works for a time until his poem "A Psalm of Life" and Hyperion. The novel was published in 1839 by Samuel Coleman, who would also publish Longfellow's poetry collection Voices of the Night, though he went bankrupt shortly after. Longfellow was paid $375 for it and was optimistic. As he wrote to his father: "As to success, I am very sanguine ... it will take a great deal of persuasion to convince me that the book is not good."

As Longfellow's fame increased over time, so did interest in his early work. By 1857, he calculated Hyperion had sold 14,550 copies.

== Critical response ==
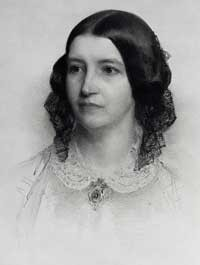
Hyperion was partly inspired by Longfellow's pursuit of Frances Appleton. She did not agree to marry him until 1843.

The initial publication of Hyperion met with lukewarm or hostile critical response. Its publication was overshadowed by Longfellow's first poetry collection, Voices of the Night, which was published five months later. Critic Edgar Allan Poe briefly reviewed Hyperion in Burton's Gentleman's Magazine in October 1839 and concluded the book was "without design, without shape, without beginning, middle, or end ... what earthly object has his book accomplished? — what definite impression has it left?" Acknowledging the poor public reception, critic John Neal nevertheless predicted the novel "will be a treasure with the few that know its value". In 1899, composer Edward Elgar sent a copy of the book to his Austrian colleague Hans Richter, noting it as "the little book ... from which I, as a child, received my first idea of the great German nations". 20th-century literary scholar Edward Wagenknecht referred to Hyperion as a "disorganized Jean-Paul Richter kind of romance".

The thinly veiled autobiographical elements of Hyperion did not go unnoticed; Frances Appleton was aware that she was the basis for the Mary character. Embarrassed by this, as biographer Charles Calhoun writes, she "displayed a new degree of frostiness toward her hapless suitor." After receiving a copy as a gift from the author, she wrote in a letter: "There are really some exquisite things in this book, though it is desultory, objectless, a thing of shreds and patches like the author's mind .... The hero is evidently himself, and ... the heroine is wooed (like some persons I know have been) by the reading of German ballads in her unwilling ears. " Longfellow himself admitted the deliberate resemblance in a letter: "The feelings of the book are true; the events of the story mostly fictitious. The heroine, of course, bears a resemblance to the lady, without being an exact portrait."

It was not until May 10, 1843, seven years after his wooing began, that Frances Appleton wrote a letter agreeing to marry. After receiving the letter, Longfellow was too restless to take a carriage and instead walked 90 minutes to her house. They were married shortly thereafter. Nathan Appleton bought the former Craigie House as a wedding present to the pair and Longfellow lived there for the rest of his life.

== Analysis ==
Through the character of Paul Flemming, Longfellow airs his own aesthetic beliefs. In his dialogue, Flemming provides quips like "The artist shows his character in the choice of his subject" and "Nature is a revelation of God; Art is a revelation of man".

The book often alludes to and quotes from German writers such as Heinrich Heine and Johann Wolfgang von Goethe. Goethe's Wilhelm Meisters Lehrjahre (1796) was a likely model for the book. The book's descriptions of Germany would later inspire its use as a companion travel guide for American tourists in that country.
