= Fanny Steers =

English author, songwriter, (1797–1861)

Frances Steers (1797–1861) was an English watercolourist and landscapist, as well as an author and composer. She is known for small-scale landscapes such as The Reeks, Killarney, Ireland, and exhibited a number of works at the New Society of Painters in Water Colours, as one of its few female members. Both William Makepeace Thackeray and Henry Wadsworth Longfellow bought her paintings, and a poetic quote from her work appears in the first edition of Bartlett's Familiar Quotations. Two of her prints are in the collection of the British Museum.

== Personal life ==
Fanny Steers was the eldest daughter of William and Mary Steers, who with their daughters ran lodging houses in Malvern Wells, for pilgrims who hoped to be cured by Malvern water.

On 11 January 1797, she was baptised Frances at Hanley Castle; she is buried in the Hanley Castle churchyard.

== Career ==
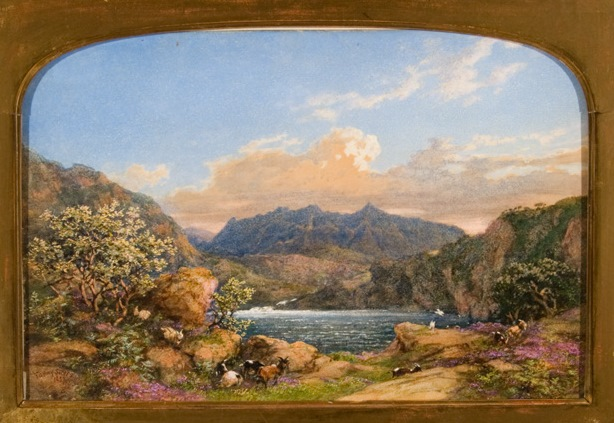
Irish scene painted by Fanny Steers and purchased by Henry Wadsworth Longfellow. It remains on display in the Longfellow House in Cambridge, Massachusetts.

Little has been written about Steers's life and work. Two small prints from the 1830s survive in the collection of the British Museum.

The British Museum print from 1834 shows a small rustic building near trees and a pond. Steers created it using the chine-collé technique, where a print is made on delicate paper in order to show fine details but afterward bonded to sturdier material. The 1835 etching shows a larger and more elegant house, also framed by lovingly sketched vegetation.

The British Museum bought both these etchings in 1849, when Steers had begun to be known for her watercolours. Neither of these early works is currently on display at the British Museum.

In 1846, she was elected a member of England's New Society of Painters in Water-Colours (NSPW), becoming one of very few women in its membership of 57 painters. As a new exhibitor in the association's 1846 show, Steers was described as "an acquisition to the gallery" by a critic who added "we know of no female artist who handles the pencil so boldly; but she must be careful not to make her skies too splashy".

An 1848 comment on her work described her as "a true disciple of the Ruskin school". (John Ruskin, an early advocate for the Pre-Raphaelites, emphasized "truth to nature" in his influential five-volume work Modern Painters.) The critic suggested, however, that she should progress from small paintings to what he described as "the great ultimatum of artistic ambition, the production of large and elaborately composed pictures".

In May 1856, The Spectator harshly criticized the NSPW exhibition but praised Steers as "the only exhibitor who has struck a full chord of artistic beauty, and reached that point at which we rest satisfied on the attainment instead of feeling the deficiency". Three of her paintings were in this exhibition, but the critic complained that what he described as "her principal work, Eventide" was "hung down to the bottom of a screen on a level with the visitor's ankles". Poor placement of women's work in exhibitions was a common problem because their paintings, like Steers's, "tended to be smaller in scale": large works got prominent placement while smaller ones became "infill", sometimes "in spaces lacking suitable lighting or sightlines".

In 1858, at a Boston exhibition of British paintings organized by (among others) William Rossetti, the first painting to be sold was a landscape by Fanny Steers. The buyer was Henry Wadsworth Longfellow, who wrote in his April 1858 diary, "At the Exhibition of English Pictures ... Delighted with the watercolours. Buy 'Lake of Killarney' by Fanny Steers." Rossetti was especially pleased by this sale, noting that William Makepiece Thackeray had also recently bought one of Steers's paintings.

In addition to her painting, Steers wrote poetry and music. Her humorous poem The Ant Prince: A Rhyme (1847) had two printings despite a mixed review in the 1848 Athenaeum and Literary Chronicle:

The Ant Prince, by Miss Fanny Steers, is a jeu d'esprit of questionable pretensions,—an Ingoldsby legend, well sugared and watered for infant palates. Miss Steers chronicles with amusing and rather ingenious exactitude the love of the Ant Prince for the Queen Bee :-a most hopeless attachment-which ends in true dramatic style, by the Prince dying in despair and the relenting Queen Bee killing herself—with her own sting—over his body.

The first (1856) edition of Bartlett's Familiar Quotations includes this quote from Steers:

The last link is broken
That bound me to thee,
And the words thou hast spoken
Have render'd me free.
