= Sands of time (idiom) =

English idiom for passage of time

The sands of time is an English idiom relating the passage of time to the sand in an hourglass.

The hourglass is an antiquated timing instrument consisting of two glass chambers connected vertically by a narrow passage which allows sand to trickle from the upper part to the lower by means of gravity. The amount of sand determines the amount of time that passes as the chamber is emptied. The image of the sand being emptied in the hourglass creates a visual metaphor for the limited duration of human life, and for the inevitability of change in the world as a whole.

== Uses ==
The phrase was used in the seventh stanza of the poem A Psalm of Life by Henry Wadsworth Longfellow.

Lives of great men all remind us
We can make our lives sublime,
And, departing, leave behind us
Footprints on the sands of time

== See also ==
- Hourglass § Symbolic uses
- Vanitas
