= Middlesex County Courthouse (Massachusetts) =

Coordinates: 42.3699°N 71.0797°W

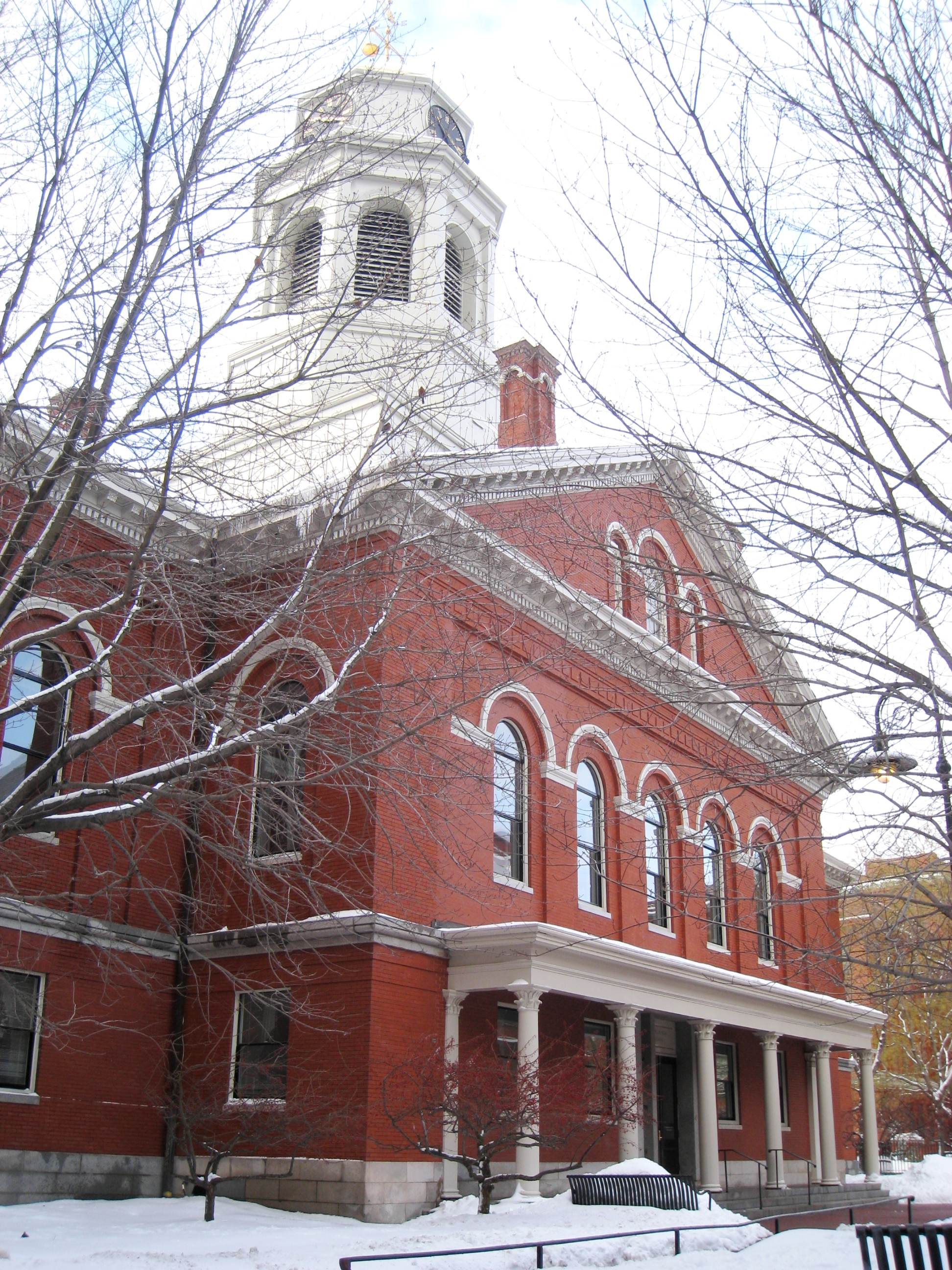
Middlesex County Courthouse

The Middlesex County Courthouse is a historic courthouse building in East Cambridge, Massachusetts. It was initially designed in 1814-1816 by noted architect Charles Bulfinch (1763–1844), and subsequently enlarged in 1848 by Ammi B. Young.

The original courthouse was given by Andrew Craigie as part of his scheme to develop East Cambridge. Bulfinch created its plans, and it was erected 1814-1816 on Third Street between Otis and Thorndike Streets. His original stuccoed building is now known by only one surviving sketch, and forms the central core of today's building.

In 1848 architect Young enlarged and refaced the building in brick, adding late Federal and Greek Revival details such as a monumental cupola, Palladian windows, and recessed wall arches. A later 1924 addition obscured his 1848 entry facade. In 1973 the buildings were slated for demolition to make a parking lot, but saved by a preservation effort led by architect Graham Gund. Restoration efforts removed the 1924 addition, recreated Young's entry portico, restored its large clock tower, and cleaned and repaired the cupola's gold dome, brickwork, cast-iron trim, wrought-iron fencing, and slate and copper roofs.

Other buildings in the restored Bulfinch Square include the imposing Registry of Deeds Building (1896, architect Otis Cutter) with its four giant brick-columned porticoes, the Clerk of Courts Building (1889), and the Third District Court Built (1931, architect Charles Greco).

The Middlesex County Courthouse building is situated adjacent to the iconic 16 story former Edward J. Sullivan "Hi-rise" Superior court building.
