= Joseph Emerson Worcester =

American lexicographer

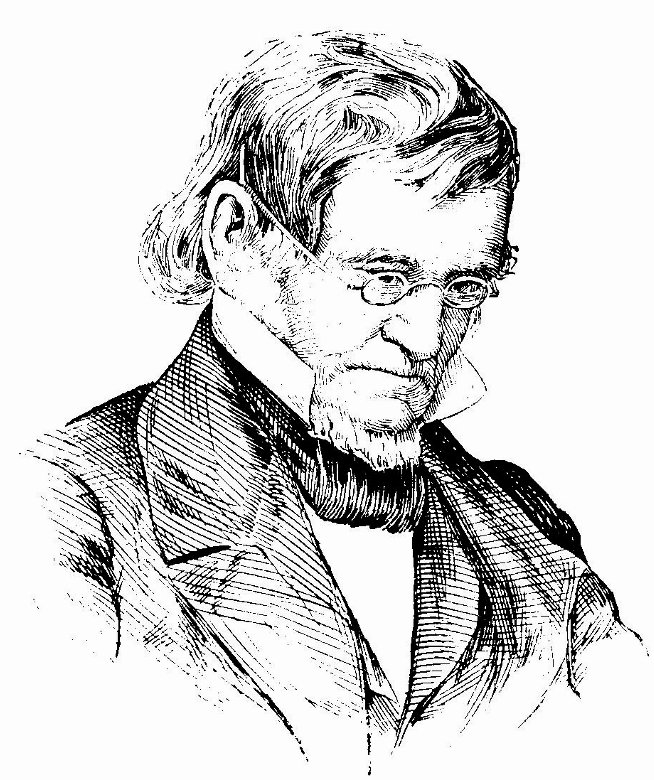
Joseph Emerson Worcester

Joseph Emerson Worcester (August 24, 1784 – October 27, 1865) was an American lexicographer who was the chief competitor to Noah Webster of Webster's Dictionary in the mid-nineteenth-century. Their rivalry became known as the "dictionary wars". Worcester's dictionaries focused on traditional pronunciation and spelling, unlike Noah Webster's attempts to Americanize words. Worcester was respected by American writers and his dictionary maintained a strong hold on the American marketplace until a later, posthumous version of Webster's book appeared in 1864, with Worcester dying the following year.

== Biography ==
=== Early life ===
Worcester was born August 24, 1784, in Bedford, New Hampshire, and worked on a farm in his youth, entering Phillips Academy, Andover, in 1805. In 1809, he entered Yale University and graduated in two years. He began a school in Salem, Massachusetts, in March 1812, but gave up on the project by 1815. One of his students had been a young Nathaniel Hawthorne; Worcester tutored Hawthorne privately at the boy's home. During this time, Worcester worked on several works on geography, including A Geographical Dictionary, or Universal Gazetteer, Ancient and Modern, which was published in 1817. In 1823, he was elected a Fellow of the American Academy of Arts and Sciences He wrote a much-used textbook, Elements of History, Ancient and Modern, accompanied by an Historical Atlas, published in 1827. Worcester collected philological works and wrote a journal in Europe in 1831. For many years, he co-edited the annual American Almanac and Repository of Useful Knowledge. He earned LL.D. degrees from Brown University (1847) and Dartmouth College (1856).

=== Dictionary war ===
Worcester's first edited dictionary was an abridgment of Samuel Johnson's English Dictionary, as Improved by Todd, and Abridged by Chalmers; with Walker's Pronouncing Dictionary Combined, published in the United States in 1827, the year before Noah Webster's American Dictionary appeared. Having worked as an assistant on the production of Webster's dictionary, he produced an abridgment of Webster's work in 1829. Worcester believed that Webster's dictionary sacrificed tradition and elegance. Worcester's version added new words, excluded etymology, and focused on pronunciation.

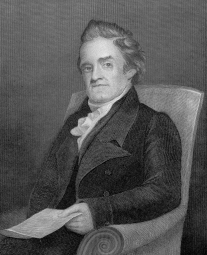
Noah Webster (1758–1843), rival of Worcester in the "dictionary wars"

Worcester published his Comprehensive Pronouncing and Explanatory English Dictionary in 1830, inciting charges of plagiarism from Webster. Worcester protested that he had worked on his dictionary before working for Webster and had used his own research. Webster's first accusations against Worcester were in March 1831, when he wrote to ask if Worcester had taken many definitions from his own work. Worcester replied, "No, not many." Accusation became attack in 1834, the Worcester, Massachusetts-based Palladium published an article that called Worcester's book "a gross plagiarism" and stated that its author "pilfer[ed] the products of the mind, as readily as... the common thief." Webster later published an open letter to Worcester in the Palladium dated January 25, 1835, accusing Worcester of stealing the definitions of 121 words, claiming their definitions were not published in any other dictionary and challenging Worcester to prove otherwise. Worcester responded saying that the burden of proof fell on Webster but provided his sources anyway. In what is often referred to as the "dictionary wars", rivalry and contention between the two dictionaries continued beyond Webster's death in 1843, and long after with Webster's successor, the G. & C. Merriam Company, which bought rights to the American Dictionary.

Worcester continued to revise his dictionary, producing A Universal and Critical Dictionary of the English Language in 1846. When a British edition of the work stated that it was based on the work of Noah Webster, and omitted Worcester's introductory statement claiming otherwise, he responded with "A Gross Literary Fraud Exposed".

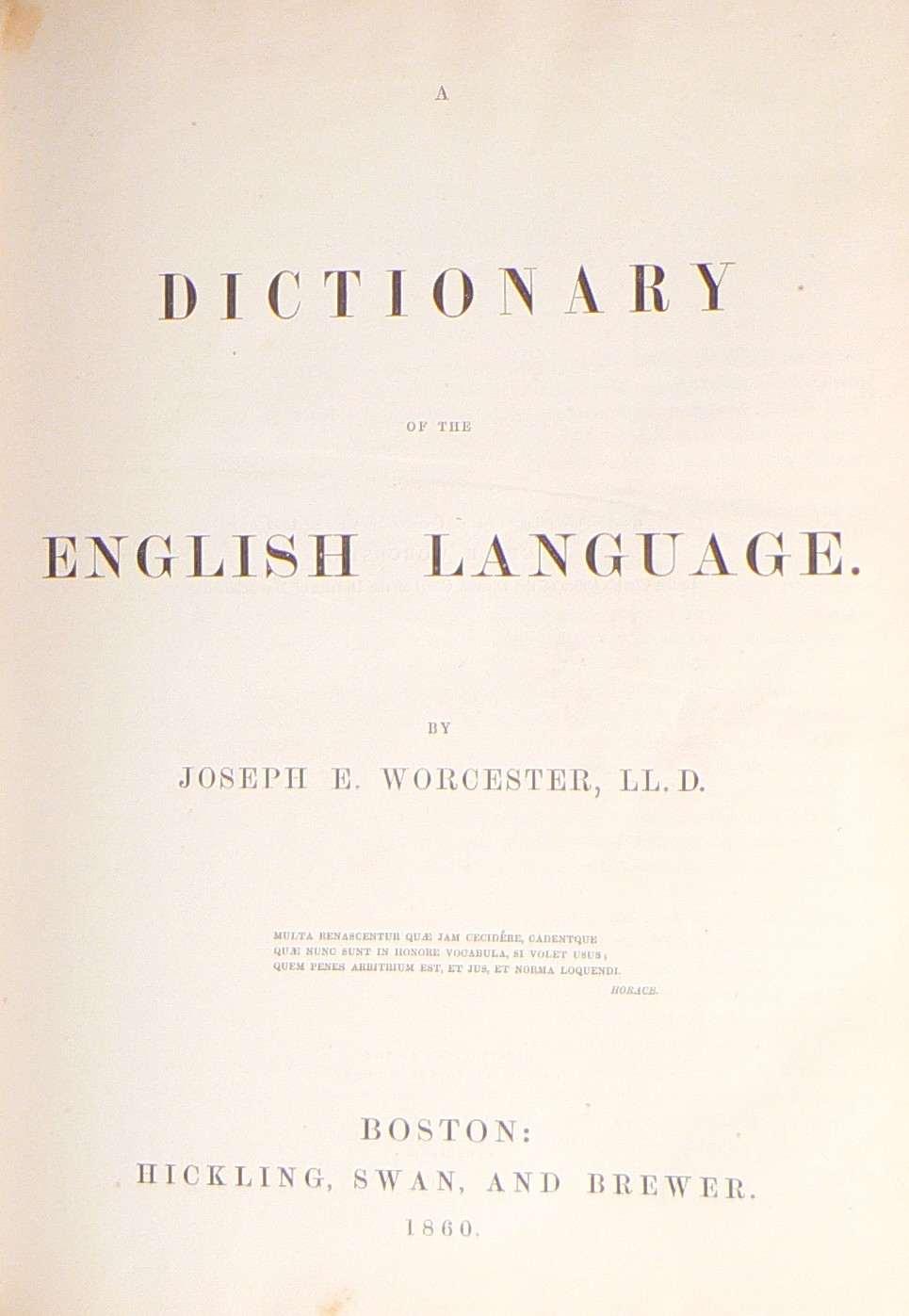
Title page of an 1860 edition of Dictionary of the English Language

In 1860, Worcester published A Dictionary of the English Language, a substantially revised and expanded work which was soon recognized as a major English language dictionary. The first copies were electrotype printed at the Boston Stereotype Foundry. The dictionary featured numerous illustrations throughout the text, a relatively new innovation. However, Worcester's work was not technically the first American dictionary to feature illustrations. Having heard about the plans for Worcester's new edition, Webster's publishers, George and Charles Merriam, rushed to put out a similar work. They managed to publish a Pictorial Edition of Webster's American Dictionary in 1859. The Pictorial Edition was basically a reprint of the 1847 American Dictionary, with engravings taken from the Imperial Dictionary of the English Language. More competition arrived in the form of the Merriam's revised edition of Webster's American Dictionary, which appeared in 1864. Worcester's dictionary was posthumously revised in 1886, but was eclipsed by Webster's International and other dictionaries of the 1890s.

=== Marriage and family ===
In 1841 he married Amy Elizabeth McKean; the couple had no children. McKean, daughter of the founder of Harvard College's Porcellian Club, had previously served as a teacher after taking over the post of Sophia Ripley.

Around this time, Worcester was living in the Craigie House in Cambridge, Massachusetts, renting rooms from the widow of Andrew Craigie, first apothecary general of the United States. When Mrs. Craigie died, Worcester rented out the entire house from her heirs and subleased rooms to the poet and professor Henry Wadsworth Longfellow. In 1843, after the house was purchased by Nathan Appleton on Longfellow's behalf, Worcester rented a portion of the house from Longfellow until the construction of his own home a few doors down was completed that spring. The home is still standing at 121 Brattle Street in Cambridge.

=== Death ===
Worcester died on October 27, 1865. He is interred at Mount Auburn Cemetery in Cambridge, Massachusetts. The historian Howard Jackson notes it was not until Worcester's death that the "dictionary war" was finally over.

== Critical response and legacy ==
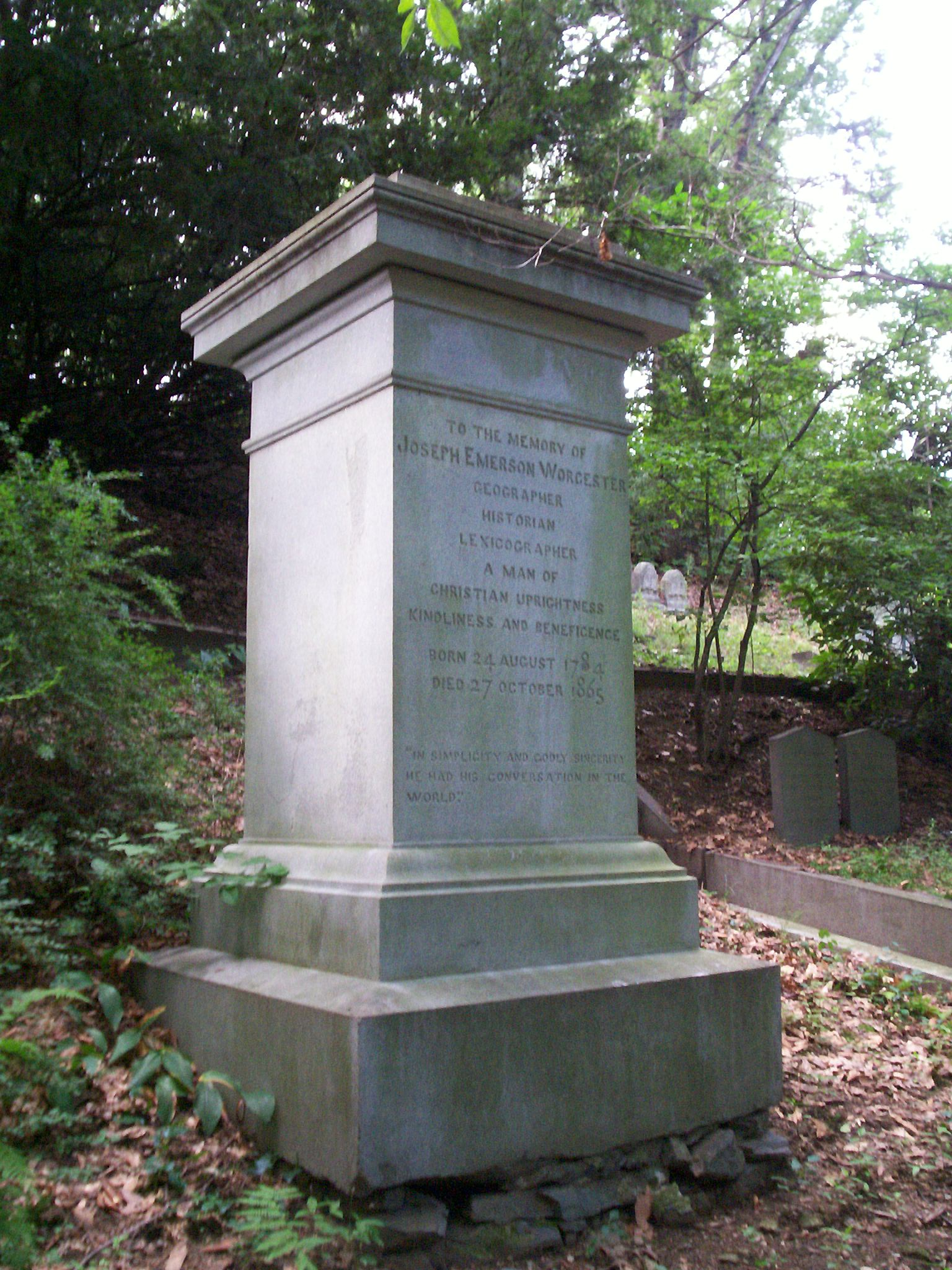
Grave of Joseph Worcester in Mount Auburn Cemetery

Unlike Webster, Worcester adhered to British pronunciation and spellings, calling them "better", "more accurate", "more harmonious and agreeable". He opposed Webster's phonetic spelling reforms (e.g. tuf for tough, dawter for daughter), to Webster's disapproval. The 20th century lexicographer and scholar James Sledd noted that the commercial rivalry between the two attracted significant public interest in lexicography and dictionaries. It was not until 1864, when the much-improved Webster-Mahn Dictionary, which completely revised etymologies, was published, that the Worcester dictionary was outsold in the American marketplace.

Worcester sent a copy of one of his dictionaries to the author Washington Irving, who predicted it would be used "to supply the wants of common schools". Though Webster's dictionary was the more popular, Worcester's book proved to be a favorite among writers. Oliver Wendell Holmes Sr. wrote that the book was one "on which, as is well known, the literary men of this metropolis are by special statute allowed to be sworn in place of the Bible." Edward Everett Hale wrote of the 1860 Dictionary of the English Language: "We have at last a good dictionary."

== Works ==
- A Geographical Dictionary, or Universal Gazetteer, Ancient and Modern (1817, enlarged 1823)
- A Gazetteer of the United States (1818)
- Elements of Geography, Ancient and Modern (1819)
- Sketches of the Earth and its Inhabitants (1823)
- Elements of History, Ancient and Modern, accompanied by an Historical Atlas (1826)
- Epitome of History (reissue of above, 1827)
- Outlines of Scripture Geography (1828)
- Johnson's Dictionary, as improved by Todd and abridged by Chalmers, with Walker's Pronouncing Dictionary combined, to which is added Walker's Key (1828)
- A Comprehensive Pronouncing and Explanatory Dictionary of the English Language with Pronouncing Vocabularies (1830)
- A Universal and Critical Dictionary of the English Language (1846)
- A Gross Literary Fraud exposed; relating to the Publication of Worcester's Dictionary in London: Together with Three Appendixes; Including the Answer of S. Converse to an Attack on him by Messrs. G. & C. Merriam (1854)
- A Dictionary of the English Language (1860)
- An Elementary Dictionary for the Common Schools with Pronouncing Vocabularies of Classical Scripture and Modern Geographical Names
- An Elementary Dictionary of the English Language
- A Primary Dictionary of the English Language
