= Middlesex South Registry of Deeds Building =

Middlesex South Registry of Deeds
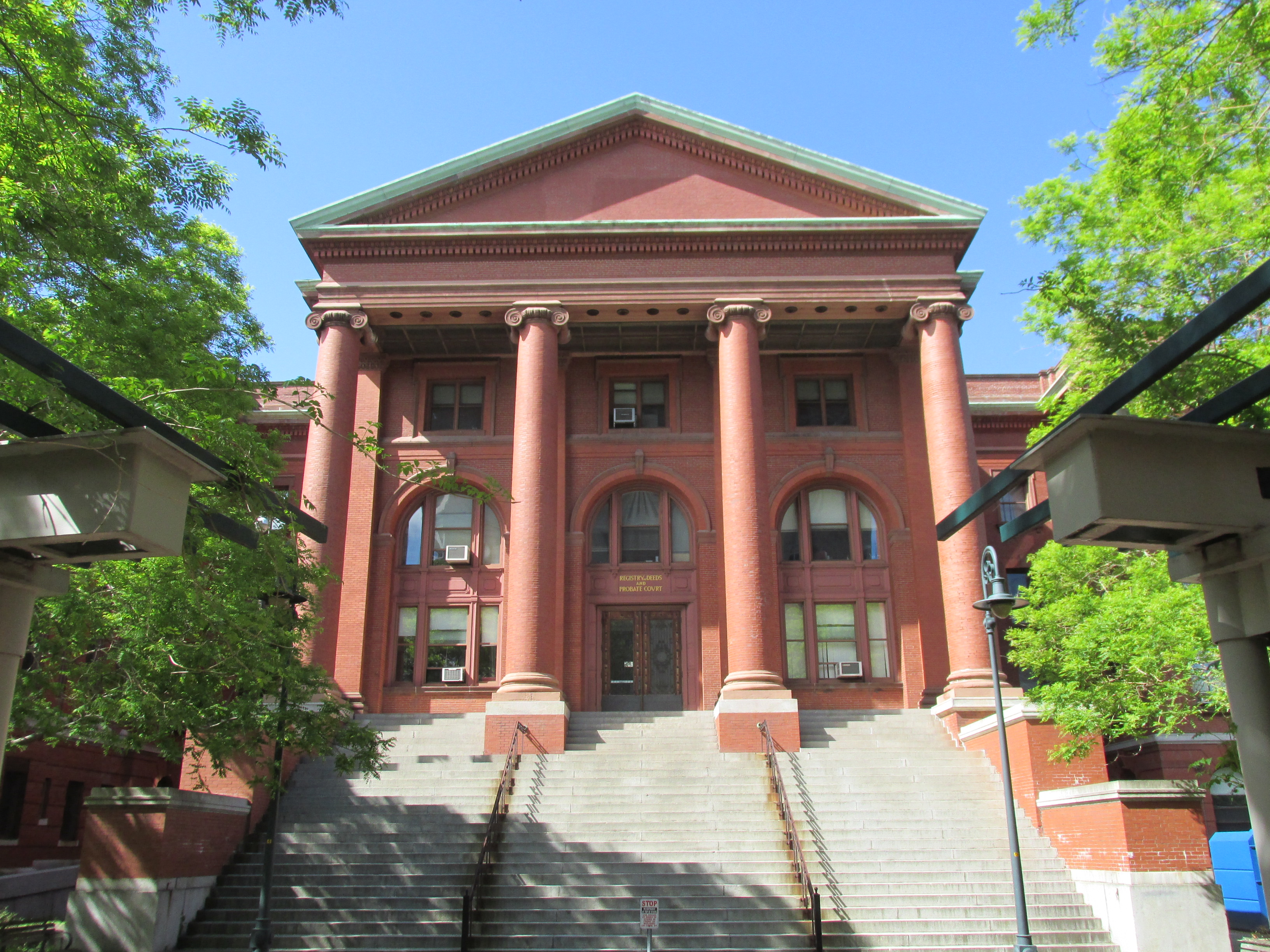
- The building's mid-section in 2014

General information
- Architectural style: American Renaissance
- Location: Cambridge, Massachusetts
- Coordinates: 42.37061°N 71.07929°W
- Completed: 1896 (129 years ago)

Design and construction
- Architect(s): Olin Cutter

The Middlesex South Registry of Deeds Building stands at 208 Cambridge Street in East Cambridge, Massachusetts, United States. Built in the American Renaissance style in 1896, to a design by Olin Cutter, it is located one block north of Middlesex County Courthouse and is bounded by Third Street to the west, Otis Street to the south and Second Street to the east.

The registry was established in 1649.

== History ==
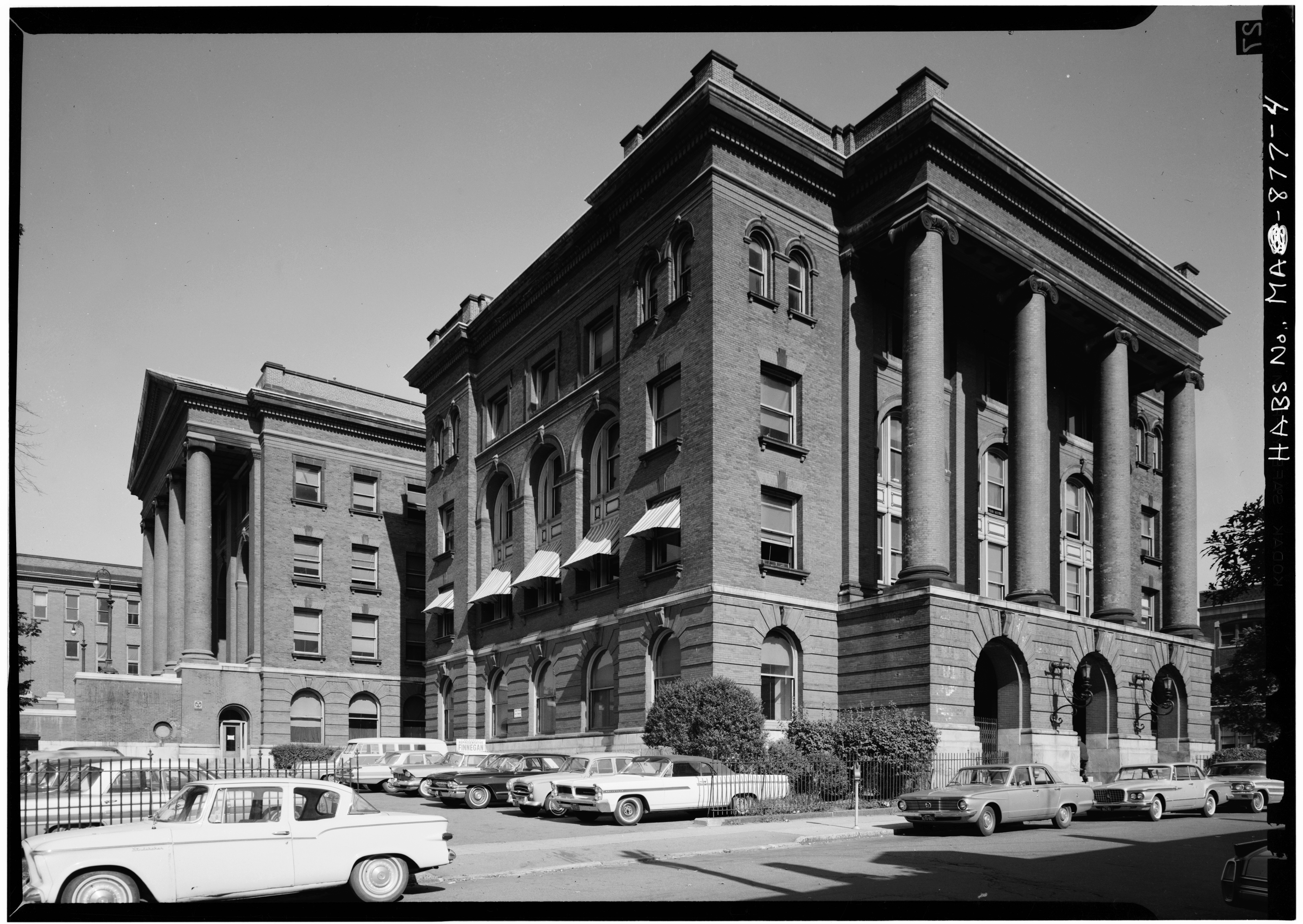
Second Street and Otis Street facades, pictured in the mid-20th century

The building was renovated in 1987, including the replacement of the Ionic columns on its facade.

In 2023, the building began use as a temporary homeless shelter for around 25 families at a time.

As of April 2025, the Register is Maria C. Curtatone. She took office in 2013.
