= Andrew Craigie =

Continental Army Apothecary General during the American Revolution (1754–1819)

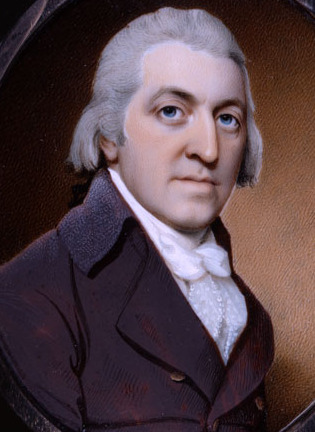
- Born: 1754; Boston, Province of Massachusetts Bay
- Died: 1819; Cambridge, Massachusetts, U.S.
- Burial place: John Vassal Tomb, Old Burial Ground, Cambridge, Massachusetts
- Occupations: Doctor, Pharmacist, Businessman
- Spouse: Elizabeth "Betsy" Nancy Shaw
- Parent(s): Andrew and Elizabeth Craigie

Andrew Craigie (1754–1819) is best known for serving as the first Apothecary General of the Continental Army during the American Revolution. The one-time owner of the Longfellow House–Washington's Headquarters National Historic Site, Craigie developed much of East Cambridge, Massachusetts and was responsible for the construction of the Canal Bridge connecting East Cambridge and Boston, which later became known as the Craigie Bridge and later was rebuilt as the Charles River Dam Bridge, but which is still also referred to as Craigie's Bridge.

== Early life ==
Born in Boston, then of the Province of Massachusetts Bay, to Scottish ship captain Andrew Craigie and his Nantucket-born wife Elizabeth, Andrew Craigie Jr. attended the Boston Latin School before being appointed by the Committee of Safety of the Province of Massachusetts on 30 April 1775 to take care of its medical stores. He was listed in a manuscript of "Medical Men in the American Revolution" deposited in the Library of Congress by Dr. J. M. Toner, who gave him the title of "Surg. Gen. Hosp." The Provincial Congress of Massachusetts Bay referred to Craigie as the "commissary of medicinal stores" and charged him with providing beds, linen, and other supplies necessary for patient care to the troops gathering around Boston. He is believed to have attended the wounded at Bunker Hill two months after his appointment.

== Apothecary ==
On 27 July 1775, the Continental Congress created "an hospital" (the forerunner of the U.S. Army's medical department) for its army of 20,000 soldiers. An apothecary was among the personnel specified in the resolution, and in time Craigie assumed that duty. His legacy in defining what ultimately became the roles of U.S. Army Medical Service Corps pharmacists and medical logistics officers is commemorated by the Association of Military Surgeons of the United States, which recognizes a federal government pharmacist each year with the Andrew Craigie Award.

After his work treating the wounded at Bunker Hill and building his practice at the hospital, he was recommended by Dr. John Morgan, director-general and chief surgeon of the army hospital, to become one of several Apothecaries General in 1777, responsible for the northern district. A subsequent reorganization of the military medical department in 1780 concentrated the authority for operations in all four districts in one medical staff. The title of "Apothecary" or "Apothecary General" was conveyed on Craigie at that time, and he became America's first official Apothecary General. Although he never met General George Washington, he came to Gen. Washington's attention, who mentioned Craigie in a letter written to "an influential member of Congress."

After he became the first apothecary general in the colonial army in 1777, Craigie recommended the creation of a central supply for medications. This supply facility was established in Lititz, Pennsylvania in 1778, and Craigie was stationed there for a period. During his time in Pennsylvania, Craigie met and fathered a child, Mary ("Polly") Allen, with a Philadelphia Quaker woman whose family forbade her to marry Craigie, a non-Quaker. Craigie evidently supported Allen without aid from the mother's family, although Allen never lived in his household. Allen is known to have lived as a girl with the family of Joel Barlow, the poet and diplomat, and a friend of Craigie. Another friend of Craigie, Mrs. David Jackson of Philadelphia, told Allen about her parents' relationship after both had died. Craigie sent Mary Allen to the Moravian Boarding School for Girls in Bethlehem, Pennsylvania, in 1779. Allen joined the Moravians and served as a teacher in Bethlehem and as superintendent of the Single Sisters' House in Nazareth. She died in Bethlehem in 1849.

== Post-war period ==
During and immediately after his time with the army, Craigie sold drugs and medicines wholesale with a partner in New York City. He also became a financier and land speculator, buying and selling parcels of property in New England and Ohio, amassing a large fortune in the process. Craigie was mustered out of the army in 1783. It is during this early post-war period that he became acquainted with then-Treasury Secretary Alexander Hamilton through his relationships with New York financial promoter William Duer (Continental Congressman) and speculator Daniel Parker. Parker played the lead role in organizing a business concern to purchase the post-war debt due to France from the United States in 1788. The men in Hamilton's circle had insider knowledge of his plan for the new federal government to assume the war debts of the states, thereby making state debt certificates a better bet. Craigie bought up large amounts of discounted South Carolina paper at a good profit.

By 1789, he had given up the wholesale pharmacy business he had started during the war, but continued to invest in real estate. He held substantial tracts in upstate New York, Oxford, Maine, and in East Cambridge, and speculated in both domestic and foreign money markets.

== Cambridge socialite and developer ==
In 1791 or 1792 (accounts vary), Craigie purchased the Vassall House and farm, comprising approximately 150 acres, which had served as Washington's headquarters during the war. The house came to be known as the "Craigie Mansion", and later through its most famous tenant as the "Longfellow House", and which today is known as the Longfellow House–Washington's Headquarters National Historic Site. The house served as a social center of Cambridge. Craigie installed gardens, a greenhouse and an icehouse, and held numerous parties and dances at what was described as his "princely bachelor's establishment".

On January 10, 1793, Andrew Craigie was married to Elizabeth ("Betsy") Nancy Shaw. The parties continues, with guests that included Queen Victoria's father and the French diplomat Talleyrand, among many others. His biographer described Craigie as someone who "entertained without regard to expense, who kept dozens of servants and well stocked stables and wine cellars".

Meanwhile, Craigie continued to invest in land speculation, much of it in East Cambridge. He secretly acquired 300 acres around Lechmere Point with several partners, and revived plans to construct a bridge from Lechmere Point to Boston, using the success of the Charlestown and West Boston Bridges as ammunition for their plans. On October 27, 1807, Craigie and twelve associates were given the authority to build the Canal Bridge. It was called "Canal Bridge" because one-third of the shares were to be held by the individual proprietors of the Middlesex Canal Corporation, but it soon came to be familiarly called "Craigie's Bridge". The original bridge was completed and opened for travel in August, 1809. The original toll bridge became toll-free in 1858 and was replaced by the current Charles River Dam Bridge in 1910. The new bridge, situated next to the Museum of Science, is still referred to as Craigie's Bridge by many.

As the area now known as Lechmere Square in East Cambridge grew, Craigie was able to exert significant influence over the areas development. The construction of the bridge prompted the laying out of roads to the center of Cambridge (now Cambridge Street, running to Harvard Square) and Somerville/Medford (Bridge Street, now Monsignor O'Brien Highway/Massachusetts Route 28). Craigie and his associates, who formed the Lechemere Point Corporation, benefited from the building boom that followed, spurred on by their efforts to expand the public street grid. Their rerouting of roads to steer traffic toward what was originally a toll bridge, however, was criticized by some at the time.

Craigie was also fundamental in convincing Middlesex County authorities to move the Middlesex County Courthouse (Massachusetts) from Harvard Square to a new Charles Bulfinch-designed building in East Cambridge.

== Later years ==
As time went on, however, Craigie become involved in debt, fueled at least in part by his work to restore the house and by the extravagant social events held at his estate, and eventually secluded himself in his house for fear of arrest for debt collection.

After his sudden death from a stroke in 1819, the Craigie estate was divided between his nephews and nieces, and Elizabeth Craigie received the house and the land immediately surrounding it. His wife became so financially burdened that she sold many effects of the mansion, and began to take in boarders. Short-term residents of the home included Washington biographer Jared Sparks, politician and future Massachusetts Governor Edward Everett, and lexicographer Joseph Emerson Worcester.

Elizabeth Craigie died on May 5, 1841. One of her more famous longer-term boarders, Henry Wadsworth Longfellow, became the owner of the house after her death.

== Legacy ==
- Longfellow House–Washington's Headquarters National Historic Site
- The Charles River Dam Bridge, a.k.a. the "Craigie Bridge" or "Craigie's Bridge"
- The Asa Gray House
- The Harvard College Botanic Gardens
- The Middlesex County Courthouse (Massachusetts)
- Lechmere Square
- Association of Military Surgeons of the U.S. Andrew Craigie Award
- Craigie Street, Cambridge
- Tony Maws-helmed Craigie on Main restaurant
