= Apothecary general =

British and American military post

Apothecary General was a British and American military post held during the times of the American Revolution. The appointment of Apothecary General in the British (or English) Army dated from 1686; it lapsed in 1826, by which time it was little more than an honorary title.

According to British regulations, the Apothecary General, like the Judge Advocate General, was a noncombatant officer who, under directions from the secretary at war, supplied the army with medicines, hospital stores, surgical instruments, etc. Semi-annually he presented a bill to the Treasury, having previously submitted it for approval to the surgeon and physician generals and to the secretary at war, who certified that the medicines specified had been forwarded to their respective destinations. During the American Revolution the British apothecary general was George Garnier.

His opposite number was Andrew Craigie, Boston apothecary and first man to hold the rank of a commissioned pharmaceutical officer in an American army. Craigie was appointed commissary of medical stores by Massachusetts' Committee of Safety, April 30, 1775, present at the Battle of Bunker Hill, and probably assisted in taking care of the sick and wounded there in a makeshift station behind the lines. When Congress reorganized the Army's Medical Department in 1777, Craigie became the first American Apothecary General. He duties included procurement, storage, manufacture, and distribution of the Army's drug requirements, but he also developed an early wholesaling and manufacturing business.

Dr. Francis LeBaron (1781–1829) served as the United States Army's Apothecary General from 1813 to 1821. Called upon to improve the Army's failed system for providing medical supplies early in the War of 1812, LeBaron's task was doomed by the military's lack of planning and resources, and further stymied by poor roads. On March 2, 1821, Congress passed an act (3 Stat. 615) reducing the army and reorganizing the staff corps. Section 10 defined the future medical staff as follows:

And be it further enacted, That the medical department shall consist of one surgeon general, eight surgeons with the compensation of regimental surgeons and forty-five assistant surgeons with the compensation of post surgeons.

This act implicitly abolished the old system of titles which had stood since the Revolution, and brought about the elimination of the American Apothecary General and his assistants.
