= Heart of New England Council =

Scouting America council

- Owner: Scouting America
- Headquarters: Rutland, Massachusetts
- Country: United States
- Founded: 2018
- President: David Bosselait
- Council Commissioner: Brian Anders
- Scout Executive: Jason Pigg
- Website http://www.HNEScouting.org/

The Heart of New England Council is a Scouting America council serving Cub Scout packs, Scouts BSA troops, Exploring posts, Sea Scout Ships, and Venturing crews in central Massachusetts with administrative support, program resources, activities, events, and camping properties.

== History ==
The Heart of New England Council was formed in 2018 from the merge of Nashua Valley Council and Mohegan Council.

Mohegan Council served the greater Worcester area and southern Worcester County. Nashua Valley Council was formed in 1965 from the merge of Wachusett Council and Fitchburg Area Council. On May 30, 2018, the Nashua Valley Council annual meeting approved a proposal to merge. The Mohegan Council annual meeting approved their proposal to merge on May 31, 2018.

The Fitchburg Area Council (231) was founded in 1918. The Wachusett Council (237) was founded in 1921. The Gardner Council (232) was founded in 1915, changing its name to Monadnock (232) in 1924. In 1965, the Fitchburg Area, Wachusett, and Monadnock councils merged to become the Nashua Valley Council.

The Mohegan Council (254) was originally the Worcester Area Council (254) was founded in 1915, changing its name to Mohegan in 1955.

== Organization ==
The council is divided into the following districts, currently serving over 200 Scouting units:

- Quinapoxet District, serving the following communities (Acton, Ashby, Auburn, Ayer, Berlin, Bolton, Boylston, Boxborough, Clinton, Fitchburg, Groton, Harvard, Holden, Lancaster, Leicester, Leominster, Littleton, Lunenburg, Paxton, Pepperell, Princeton, Rutland, Shirley, Shrewsbury, Sterling, Townsend, West Boylston, and Worcester).
- Soaring Eagle District, serving the following communities (Ashburnham, Athol, Barre, Brookfield, Charlton, Douglas, Dudley, East Brookfield, Gardner, Grafton, Hardwick, Hubbardston, Millbury, New Braintree, Northbridge, North Brookfield, Oakham, Orange, Oxford, Petersham, Phillipston, Royalston, Southbridge, Spencer, Sturbridge, Sutton, Templeton, Upton, Ware, Warren, Webster, West Brookfield, Westminster, and Winchendon).

== Camps ==
The council maintains three camp properties. Treasure Valley Scout Reservation, in Rutland, Massachusetts, which operates a weeklong Scout Resident Camp, a Cub Scout Day Camp, and a Webelos Resident Camp. Camp Wanocksett, in Dublin, New Hampshire, operates a summer week-long Scout and Venturing residential camp and a Webelos Resident Camp. Camp Split Rock, in Ashburnham, is used as a weekend retreat camp for units to rent cabins and campsites. All three camps are available to all Scouting units for year-round camping and programs.

=== Treasure Valley Scout Reservation ===
Treasure Valley Scout Reservation
- Owner: Scouting America
- Country: United States
- Founded: 1926
- Website http://www.tvsrbsa.org/

Treasure Valley Scout Reservation is located in Rutland, Paxton, Oakham, and Spencer, and is located in the center of the Heart of New England coverage area. It has over 1,500-acre (6.1 km^{2}) of protected wilderness, operating summer camp since 1926. The camp still operates Summer Camp programs, and weekend programs. Located on Browning Pond. Treasure Valley Scout Reservation was developed on what was previously known as the Browning Family Farm / Homestead.

=== Camp Wanocksett ===
Camp Wanocksett
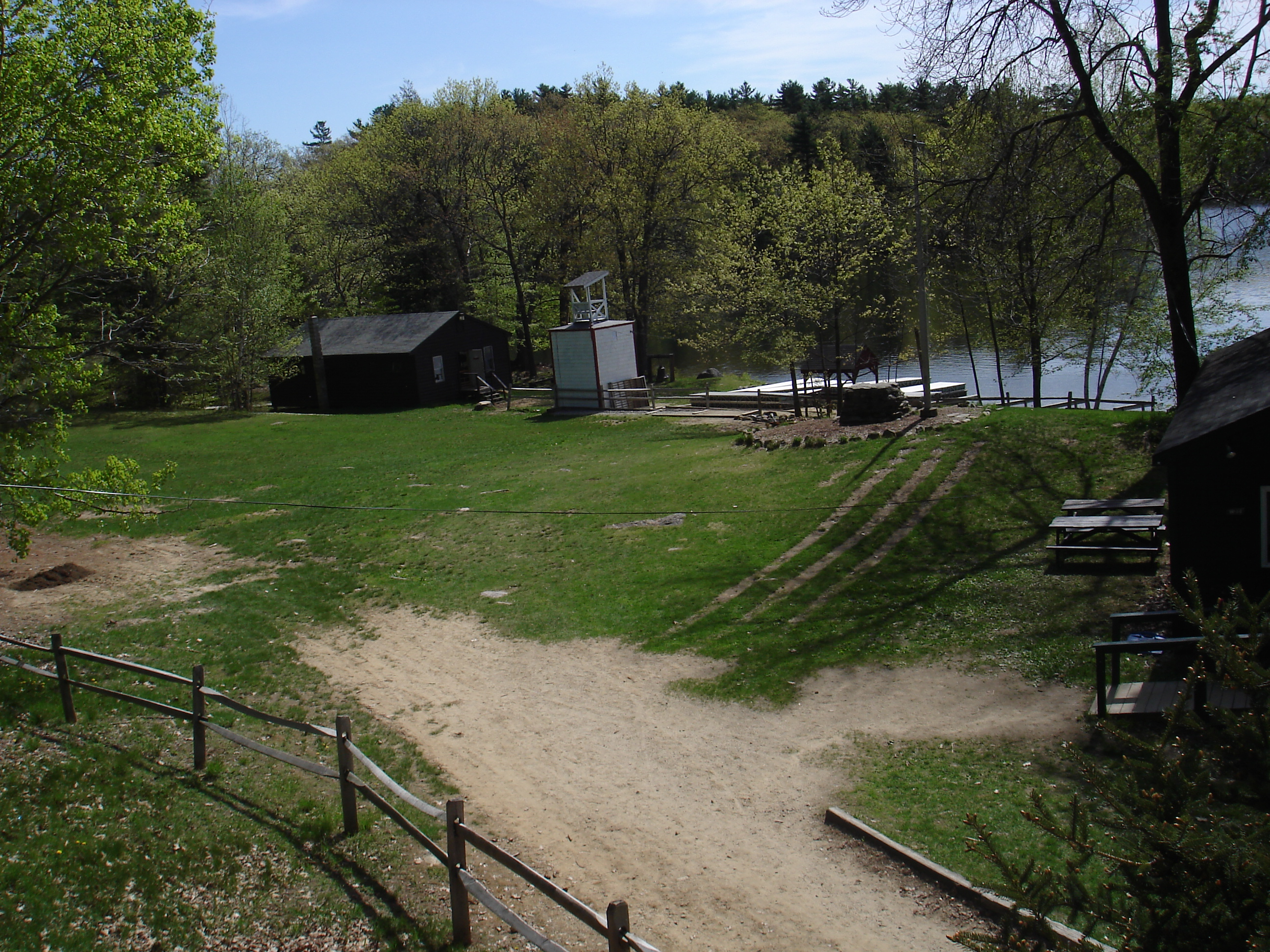
- Main field of Camp Wanocksett, from the Administration building porch
- Location: Dublin, New Hampshire
- Founded: 1924
- Website http://www.campwanocksett.org

Camp Wanocksett is a 250-acre (1.0 km^{2}) Boy Scouts of America camp located in Dublin, New Hampshire, and borders the Monadnock State Park. It is used by the Heart of New England Council, which is based in central Massachusetts. Summer camp and weekend programs take place at the camp, and units can rent campsites and cabins. Camp Wanocksett borders Thorndike Pond and Mount Monadnock, one of the most frequently climbed mountains in the world. The camp was started in 1924 on land that had previously been a farm. Its name is derived from a combination of three mountains in the area; Watatic, Monadnock, and Wachusett.

== Order of the Arrow ==
Catamount Lodge
- Founded: 2019
- Lodge Chief: Isaac Moore
- Lodge Adviser: Kevin Fuller
- Staff Adviser: Kelly Stickney
- Website http://www.OACatamount.org

Catamount Lodge is an Order of the Arrow lodge serving central Massachusetts, in Heart of New England Council. The lodge is run by its executive board, including five elected positions including chief, vice chiefs, secretary, and treasurer. The board is also made of several appointed chairs, including social media, inductions, brotherhood, fellowship, and ceremonies among others. The lodge manages and conducts several events throughout the course of a year, including a Spring Fellowship Weekend, Fall Fellowship Weekend, Winter Fellowship Weekend, and a Lodge Banquet. The lodge has over 500 members, 80% of which are active in events.

Catamount Lodge was formed in 2019 by the merger of Pachachaug Lodge and Grand Monadnock Lodge.

== See also ==
- Scouting in Massachusetts
