= Thorndike Pond =

Lake in New Hampshire, United States

- Location within New Hampshire Location within the United States
- Location: Cheshire County, New Hampshire
- Coordinates: 42°51′28″N 72°3′24″W
- Primary outflows: Stanley Brook
- Basin countries: United States
- Max. length: 1.5 mi (2.4 km)
- Max. width: 0.5 mi (0.80 km)
- Surface area: 252 acres (1.02 km^{2})
- Average depth: 11 ft (3.4 m)
- Max. depth: 23 ft (7.0 m)
- Surface elevation: 1,158 ft (353 m)
- Settlements: Jaffrey; Dublin

Thorndike Pond is a 252-acre (1.02 km^{2}) water body located in Cheshire County in southwestern New Hampshire, United States, in the towns of Jaffrey and Dublin. The pond is located at the base of Mount Monadnock. Water from Thorndike Pond flows north via Stanley Brook, then east via Nubanusit Brook to the Contoocook River, a tributary of the Merrimack River.

Whittemore Island is centrally located on the lake and contains a looping walking trail that is maintained by The Nature Conservancy.

The lake is classified as a warmwater fishery, with observed species including smallmouth and largemouth bass, chain pickerel, horned pout, and bluegill.

== See also ==
- Camp Wanocksett
- List of lakes in New Hampshire
