= Mount Monadnock =

Mountain in New Hampshire, US

- Grand Monadnock
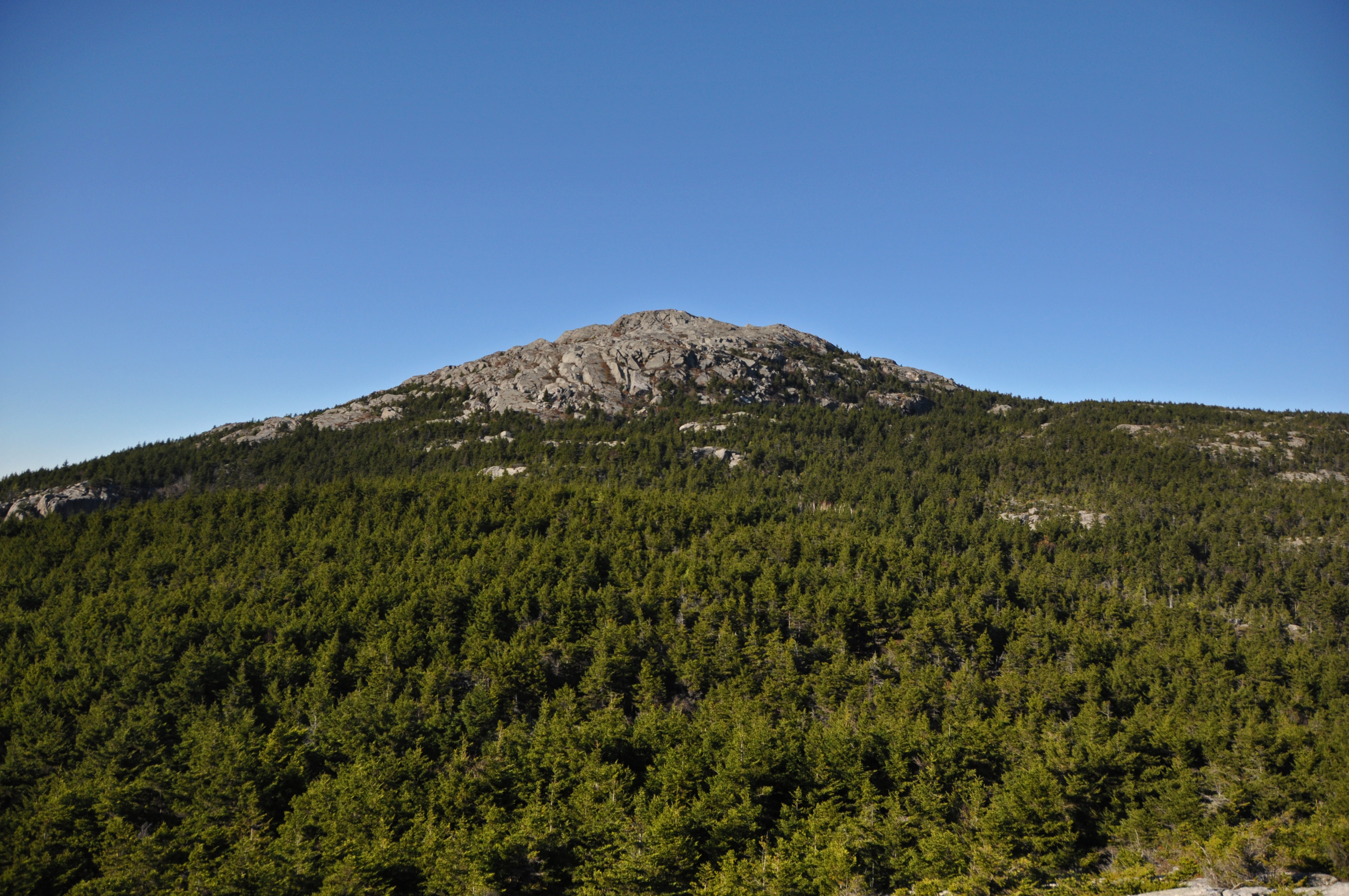
- The summit of Mount Monadnock

Highest point
- Elevation: 3,170 ft (970 m)
- Prominence: 2,130 ft (649 m)
- Listing: #33 New England Fifty Finest
- Coordinates: 42°51′41″N 72°06′29″W

Geography
- Location within New Hampshire Location within the United States
- Location: Jaffrey, Cheshire County, New Hampshire, United States

Geology
- Rock age: 400 million years
- Mountain type: Monadnock (Inselberg)
- Rock type(s): Littleton formation schist/quartzite

Climbing
- First ascent: 1725 by Captain Samuel Willard (first recorded)
- Easiest route: White Arrow Trail, 2.3 mi (3.7 km)

U.S. National Natural Landmark
- Designated: 1987

Mount Monadnock, or Grand Monadnock, is a mountain in the town of Jaffrey, New Hampshire. It is the most prominent mountain peak in southern New Hampshire and is the highest point in Cheshire County. It lies 38 miles (61 km) southwest of Concord and 62 miles (100 km) northwest of Boston. At 3,165 feet (965 m), Mount Monadnock is nearly 1,000 feet (305 m) higher than any other mountain peak within 30 miles (48 km) and rises 2,000 feet (610 m) above the surrounding landscape. Monadnock's bare, isolated, and rocky summit provides expansive views. It is known for being featured in the writings of Ralph Waldo Emerson and Henry David Thoreau.

Mt. Monadnock has long been cited as one of the most frequently climbed mountains in the world. It bears a number of hiking trails, including the 110-mile (180 km) Metacomet-Monadnock Trail and the 50-mile (80 km) Monadnock-Sunapee Greenway. The summit is barren largely because of fires set by early settlers. The first major fire, set in 1800 to clear the lower slopes for pasture, swept through the stands of virgin red spruce on the summit and flanks of the mountain. Between 1810 and 1820, local farmers, who believed that wolves were denning in the blowdowns, set fire to the mountain again. The conflagration raged for weeks, destroying the topsoil and denuding the mountain above 2,000 feet (610 m).

The term "monadnock" is used by American geologists to describe any isolated mountain formed from the exposure of a harder rock as a result of the erosion of a softer one once surrounding it (a landform termed "inselberg" ("island-peak") elsewhere in the world).

== Name ==
It is thought to derive from either the Abenaki menonadenak (transl. smooth mountain) or menadena (transl. isolated mountain). The term was adopted by early settlers of southern New Hampshire and later by American geologists as an alternative term for an inselberg or isolated mountain. Mount Monadnock is often called Grand Monadnock, to differentiate it from other Vermont and New Hampshire peaks with "Monadnock" in their names.

Its official name on federal maps is "Monadnock Mountain".

== History ==
=== The transcendentalists ===
Ralph Waldo Emerson, Henry David Thoreau, and Margaret Fuller visited the mountain and wrote fondly of it. Emerson was a frequent visitor, and made the mountain the subject of "Monadnoc", one of his most famous poems. Thoreau visited the mountain four times between 1844 and 1860, and spent a great deal of time observing and cataloging natural phenomena. He is regarded as having written one of the first serious naturalist inventories of the mountain. A bog near the summit of Mount Monadnock and a rocky lookout off the Cliff Walk trail are named after him; another lookout is named after Emerson.

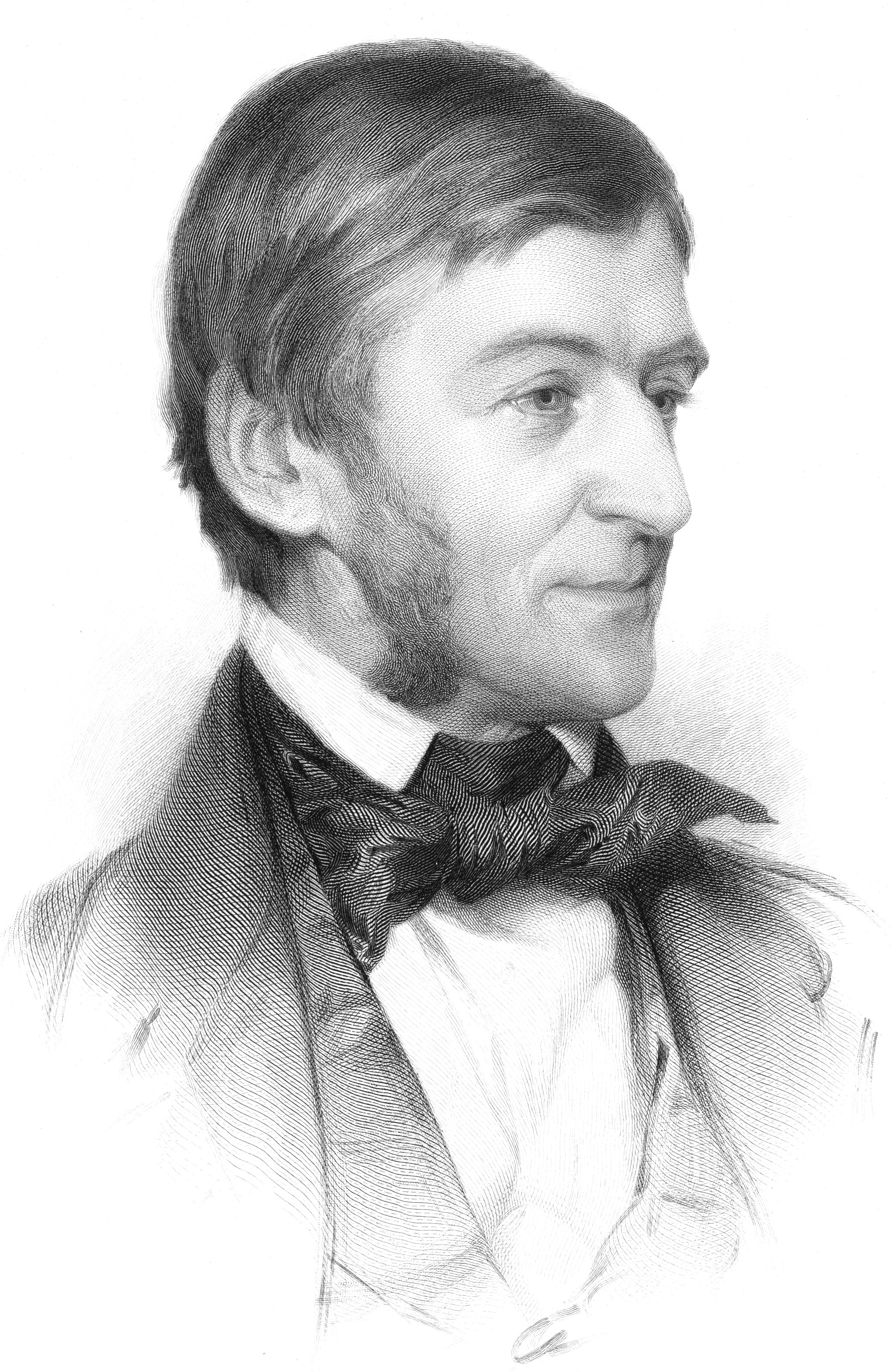
Ralph Waldo Emerson

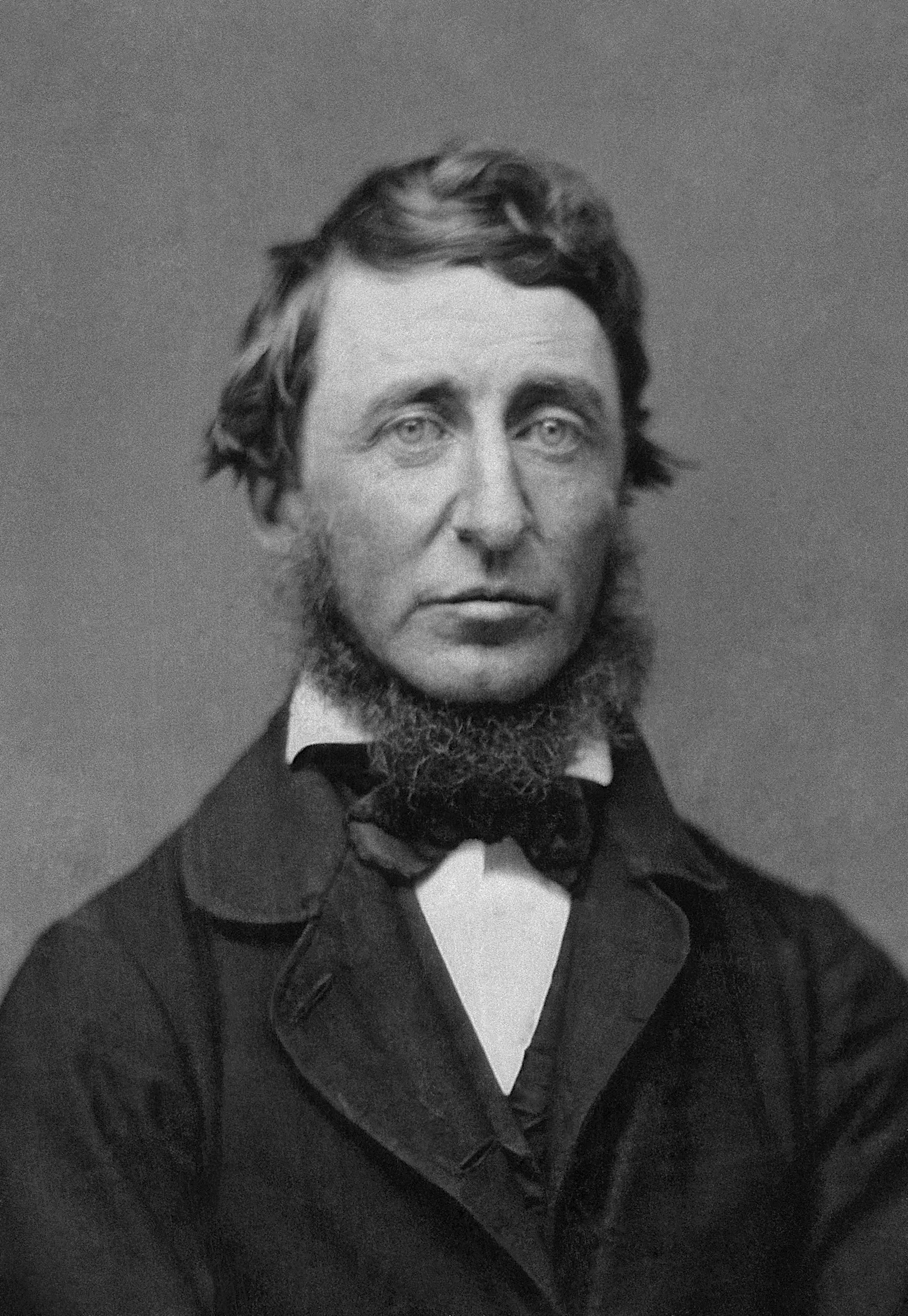
Henry David Thoreau

=== The Halfway House and other structures ===
In 1858, Moses Cudworth of Rindge opened the "Halfway House" hotel on the south side of the mountain, roughly halfway from the base to the summit. The "Toll Road" was built to service it. By that time the popularity of the mountain was booming, and it was not long before Cudworth enlarged the hotel to accommodate 100 guests. On busy summer days, the stables at the Halfway House held as many as 75 horses. The Halfway House became public property when hundreds of residents of the nearby towns formed a coalition to buy the Toll Road and hotel, and worked to prevent a radio tower from being constructed on the summit. After the hotel burned down in 1954, a concession stand operated at the site until 1969. It and the toll road were both closed to public vehicles. Moses Spring, with its source in a hole drilled through a rock behind the site, is one of the few remaining artifacts of the hotel years. The foundations of two water tanks, and the nearby reservoir that fed them, are extant on the hillside above the Old Halfway House.

A small firewarden's hut was located on the summit of Mount Monadnock and operated from 1911 to 1948, when it was decommissioned with the advent of modern means of detecting forest fires. The hut was used as a snack bar concession and hikers' shelter until 1969; it was removed in 1972. A small cabin, located farther down the mountain, served as the fire lookout's residence. It, too, has been removed.

A private dwelling, 400 feet (120 m) south of the site of the former Halfway House, is the last remaining inholding on the mountain above 1,000 feet (300 m).

=== Hiking history ===
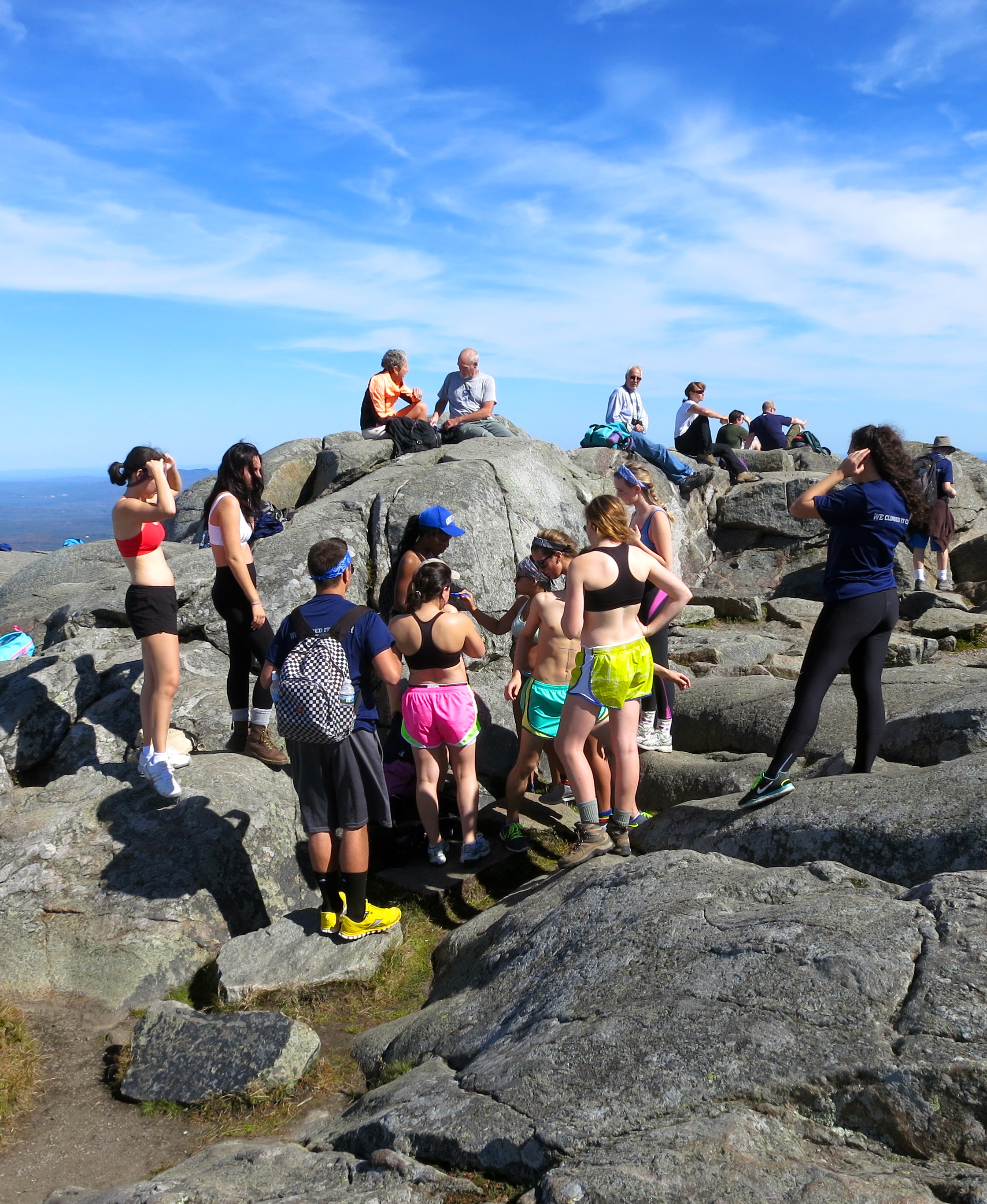
Typical crowded summit of Mt. Monadnock on a sunny autumn day

The earliest recorded ascent of Mount Monadnock took place in 1725 by Captain Samuel Willard and fourteen rangers under his command who camped at the top and used the summit as a lookout while patrolling for Native Americans. Before the practice came to be frowned upon, many early hikers carved their names in the summit; the earliest such engraving reads "S. Dakin, 1801" and is attributed to a local town clerk.

Notable "power hiking" records associated with the mountain include that of Garry Harrington, who hiked to the summit 16 times in a 24-hour period, and Larry Davis, who claimed to have hiked to the summit daily for 2,850 consecutive days (7.8 years). Davis has hiked the mountain over 7,250 times in the past 35 years.

Monadnock is often claimed to be the second-most frequently climbed mountain in the world, after Mount Fuji in Japan. Monadnock is climbed by 125,000 hikers yearly, while Mount Fuji sees 200,000-300,000 hikers yearly. However, according to UNESCO, Tai Shan in China receives more than 2 million visitors a year, far surpassing the other two peaks in popularity.

== Bio-geography, ecology, and geology ==
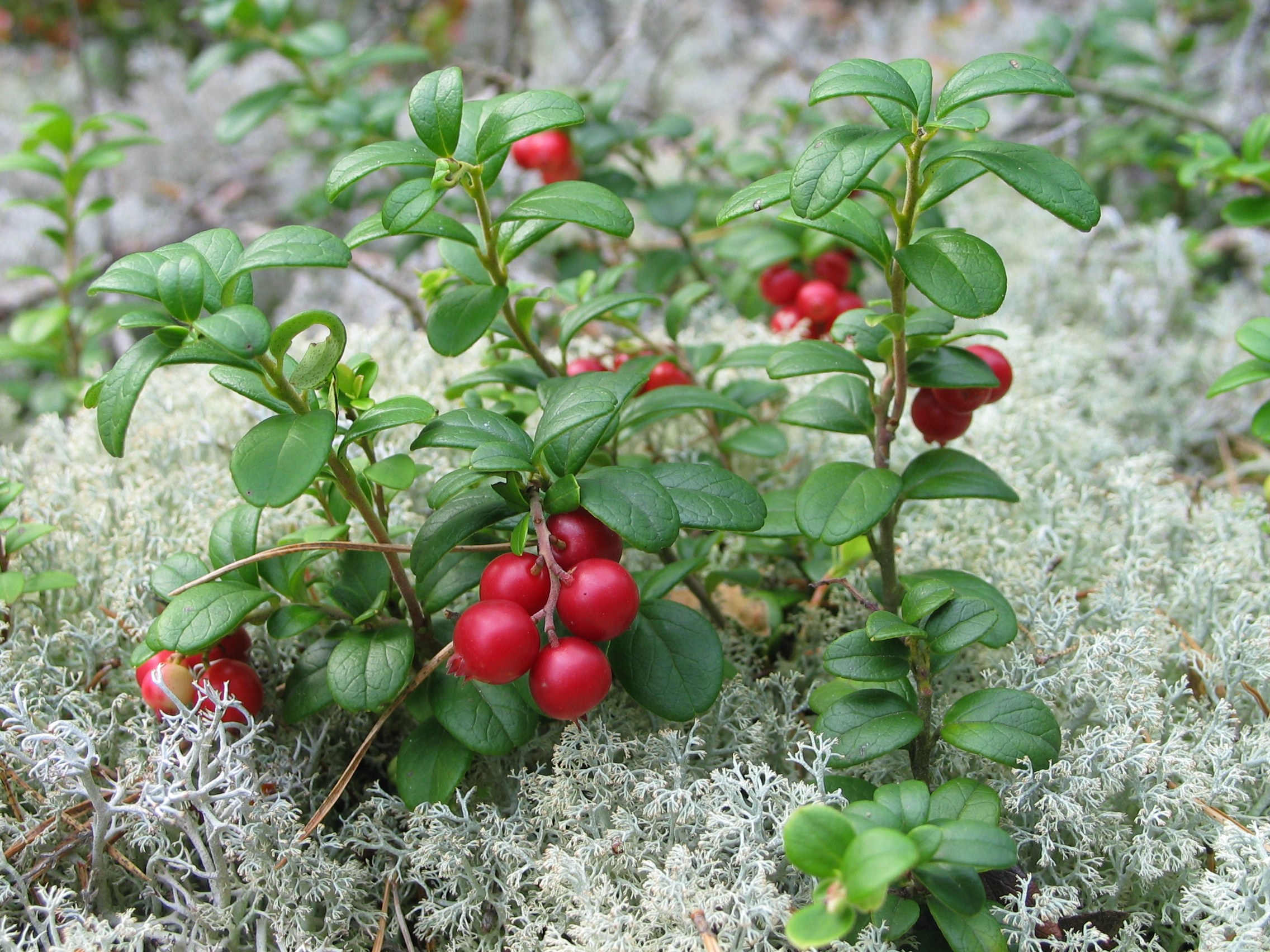
The mountain cranberry thrives on Mount Monadnock.

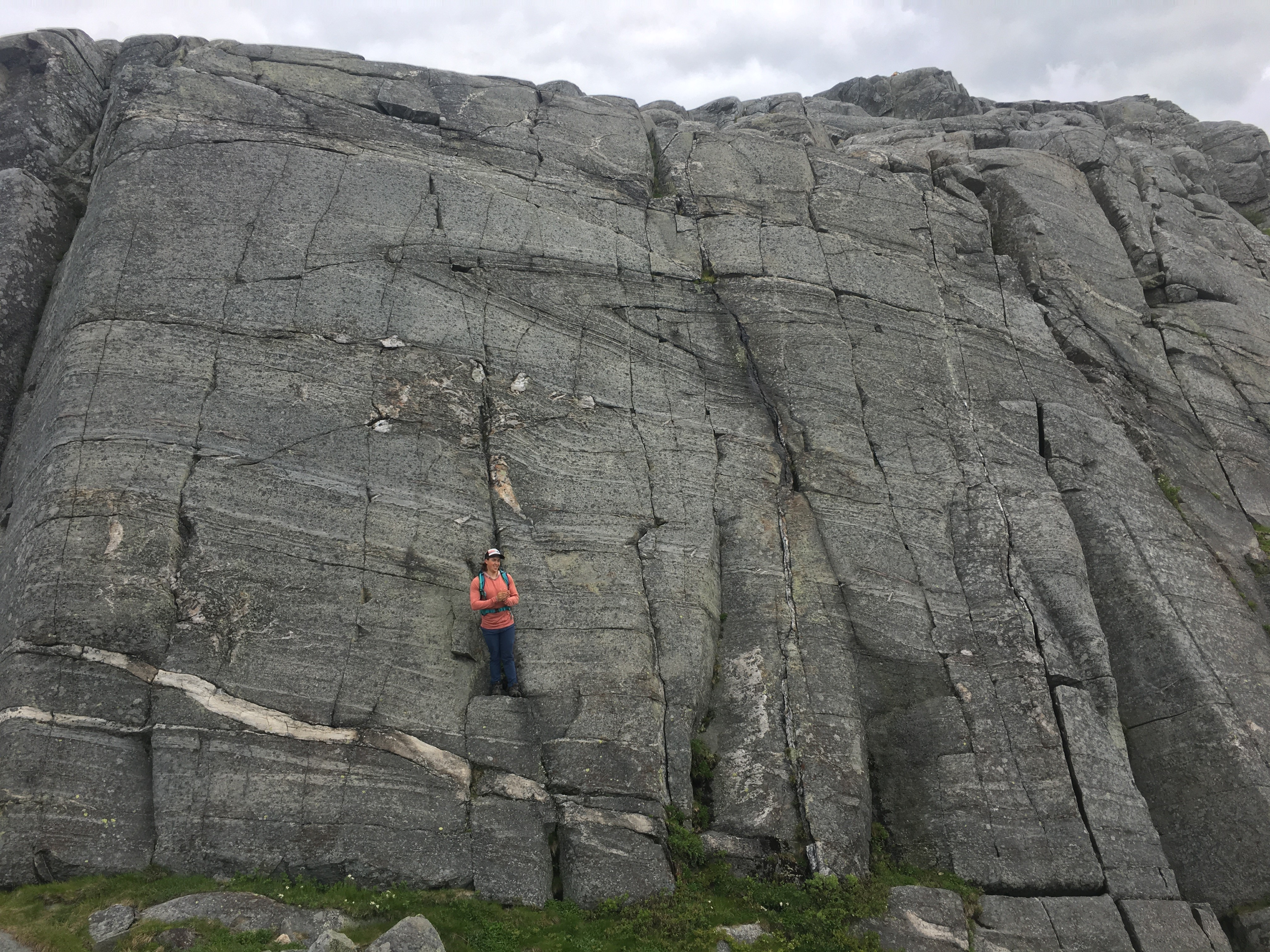
The Billings fold in quartzite and schist of the Devonian Littleton Formation

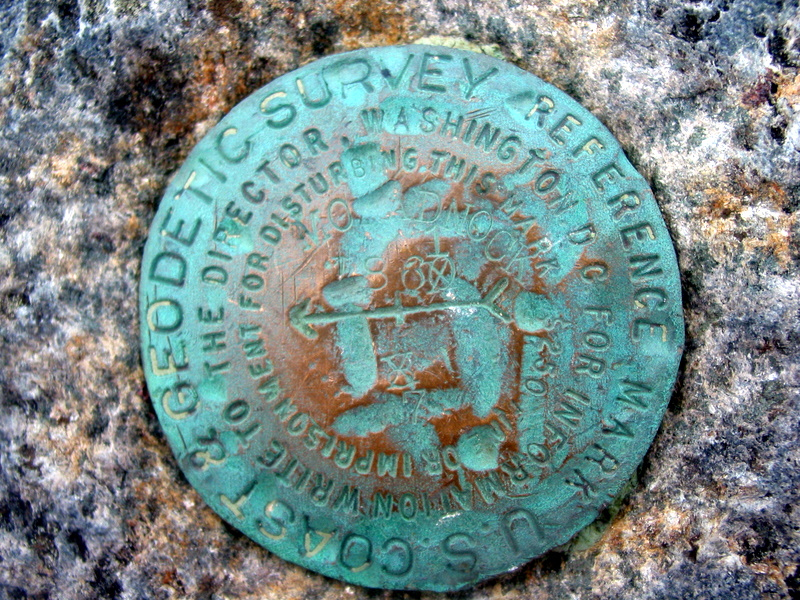
USGS reference mark on the summit

Due to fires in the early 19th century which burned a majority of the top 300 feet (90 m) around the summit, there is little soil cover on the peak and surrounding uplands. Soils are mapped as Rock Outcrop over a large area around the summit, while low-lying areas have classic podzol stony fine sandy loam profiles usually mapped as Lyman or Tunbridge series. Although the mountain has recovered to the degree that its landscape appears natural, Mount Monadnock is an example of a mountain which has an artificial tree line, occurring well below the climatic tree line of similar mountains in the region.

From the base to the summit, floral species diminish with increasingly shallow soil levels. The summit is home to many different specialized sub-alpine species which can retain moisture for long periods of time. Alpine and sub-alpine species include mountain ash, cotton grass, sheep laurel, mountain sandwort, and the mountain cranberry. Krummholz, trees stunted by harsh weather, are found on Mount Monadnock, as are several alpine bogs. Lower elevations on Mount Monadnock are clad in northern hardwood forest species; middle elevations support stands of red spruce. Before the fires, Mount Monadnock was totally covered in a red spruce forest. Since the summit has been barren of soil cover, red spruce have been slowly ascending back towards the top in a process known as ecological succession.

The mountain is largely composed of 400-million-year-old schist and quartzite rock primarily associated with the Devonian Littleton Formation, which extends south into Massachusetts and north into the White Mountains. At lower elevations on the mountain, and stratigraphically below the Littleton Formation, the bedrock is from the Silurian period, consisting of Rangeley Formation schists, Perry Mountain Formation quartzites, the Francestown Formation granulite, and the Warner Formation granulite. Structurally, the mountain is part of an overturned syncline – called a fold nappe – that was caused by the compressional forces of the Acadian orogeny. Dramatic small- to medium-scale metamorphic folds are visible on many of the rock faces of the mountain, including the famous Billings Fold (a recumbent syncline found about 450 feet (140 m) west of the summit), shown in the 1942 edition of Marland P. Billings' Structural Geology. In addition to impressive folds, the Devonian Littleton Formation shows large pseudomorphs of sillimanite after andalusite that occur as 4-inch-long (102 mm) "turkey tracks".

=== Climate ===
Mount Monadnock has a humid continental climate (Köppen Dfb) with subarctic climate (Köppen Dfc) characteristics.

== Hydrology ==
Mount Monadnock lies on the divide between the Connecticut River and Merrimack River watersheds. The northern slopes of the mountain drain to Howe Reservoir, then via Minnewawa Brook to the Ashuelot River, the Connecticut River, and ultimately Long Island Sound. Gleason Brook and Mountain Brook flow off the western slopes, then via Shaker Brook to the South Branch of the Ashuelot River. The southwestern slopes of the mountain drain to Fassett Brook, then Quarry Brook, before reaching the South Branch of the Ashuelot.

To the southeast of the mountain, Mead Brook and Stony Brook flow to Mountain Brook, a tributary of the Contoocook River, which flows north to the Merrimack River and ultimately the Gulf of Maine. The eastern slopes of the mountain drain to Thorndike Pond, the outlet of which (Stanley Brook) flows northeast to Nubanusit Brook, then into the Contoocook and the Merrimack.

== Recreation ==
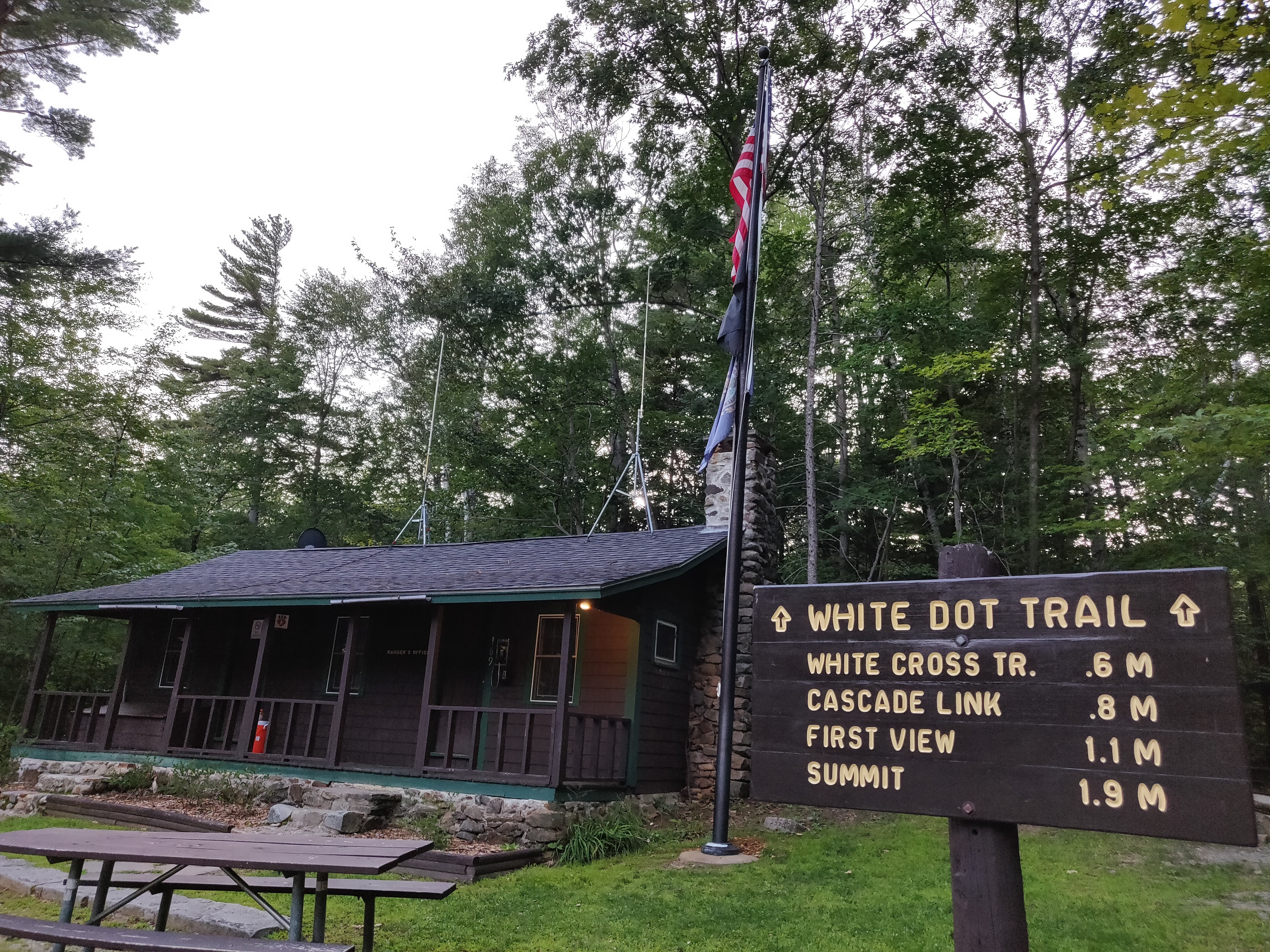
Mount Monadnock State Park headquarters

Mount Monadnock is open to hiking, backpacking, picnicking, and snowshoeing. Backcountry skiing is possible on some of the lower trails. A seasonal campground east of the mountain is maintained by the state of New Hampshire, but camping is not allowed anywhere else on the mountain. A per-vehicle fee is charged to park at the Old Toll Road and State Park Headquarters trailheads. There are no roads to the summit, and the Old Toll Road, which leads to the Halfway House site, is closed to vehicles. ATVs are not allowed on the mountain. Good views of the mountain can be had from a number of regional roads and highways, especially from New Hampshire Route 124.

=== Trails ===
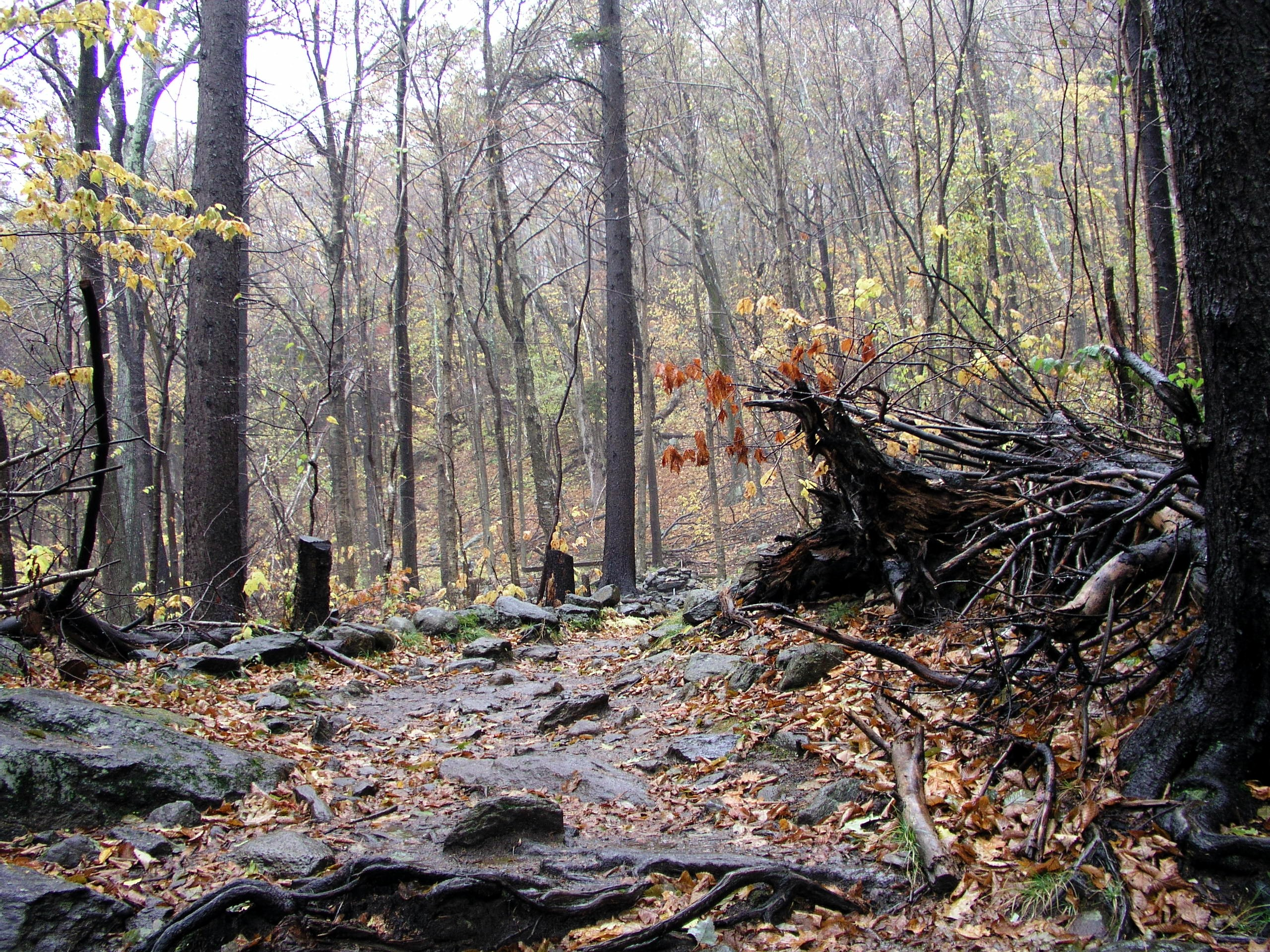
Near the head of the White Dot Trail

Mount Monadnock is criss-crossed by many miles of well-maintained hiking trails. The most popular trails are the White Dot Trail, 2.2 miles (3.5 km), the shortest but steepest ascent to summit, accessible from the Monadnock State Park headquarters and campground on the southeast side of the mountain; and the White Arrow Trail, 2.3 miles (3.7 km) to summit, considered the easiest ascent, via the Old Toll Road (Halfway House) trailhead on the south side of the mountain. Other major trails include:

- The Marlboro Trail, on the west side of the mountain, 2.2 miles (3.5 km) to summit
- The Dublin Path, also part of the Monadnock-Sunapee Greenway, on the north side, 2.4 miles (3.9 km) to summit
- The Pumpelly Trail, on the northeast side, the longest ascent, 4.4 miles (7.1 km) to summit. This trail boasts panoramic views for longer than the other trails, as it hugs the ridge.
- The Birchtoft Trail (Gilson Pond trailhead) and several connecting trails, providing access to the summit from the east side of the mountain
- The Cascade Link, on the east side of Monadnock, connects the White Dot Trail to Pumpelly Trail while providing easterly views from its exposed ridge. Spellman Trail and Red Dot Trail may also be accessed from Cascade Link.

Other important trails include the White Cross Trail, an alternative parallel to the White Dot Trail, and the Cliff Walk, a scenic detour that shadows a ledge to the east of the White Arrow Trail.

Mount Monadnock is the northern terminus of the Metacomet-Monadnock Trail (also known as the "M&M Trail"), a 110-mile-long (180 km) hiking trail stretching south through Massachusetts to the Connecticut border. The trail ascends the mountain from the southwest; however, there is no trailhead where that trail crosses Route 124 at the foot of the mountain, and the highway there is marked with "no parking" signs. The closest trailhead southbound on the M&M Trail is on Bullard Road, which leads south from Route 124 half a mile west of the M&M Trail's crossing of the state highway.

The mountain is also the southern terminus of the Monadnock-Sunapee Greenway, a 50-mile (80 km) highland trail connecting Mount Monadnock and Mount Sunapee. A third long-distance trail project, the Wantastiquet-Monadnock Greenway, aims at linking Mount Monadnock with Pisgah State Park and Wantastiquet Mountain, a prominent peak in Hinsdale, New Hampshire, overlooking the town of Brattleboro, Vermont, and the Connecticut River.

=== Hiking the mountain ===
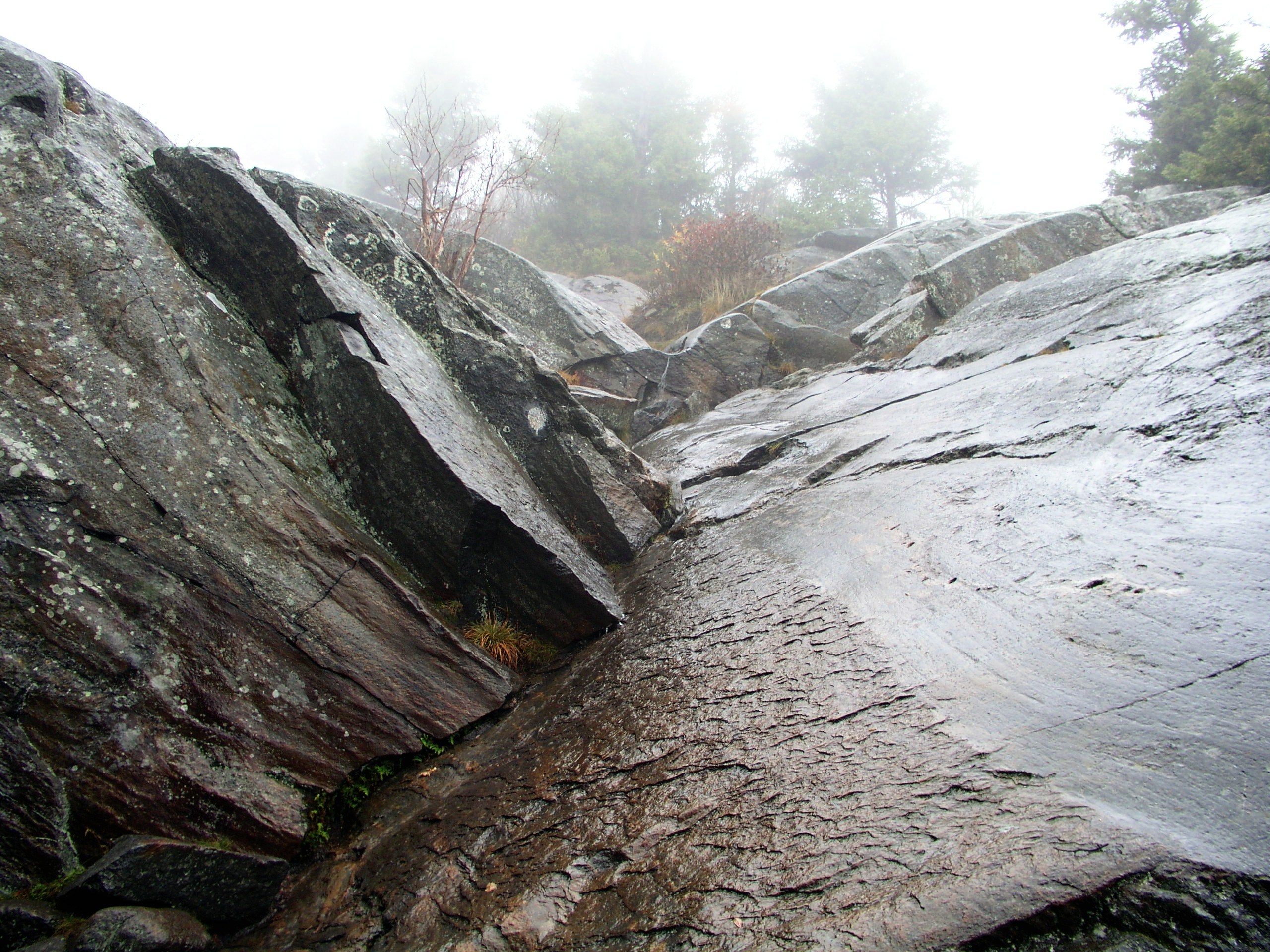
"The Chute", one mile from the summit on the White Dot Trail

The trip to the summit and back via one of the shorter trails, which usually takes less than six hours, is considered moderately challenging for the average hiker but requires no technical skills during the late spring to early fall season. Throughout the year wind and weather on the exposed, rocky summit cause harsher conditions than below the tree line. Winter storms and summer thunderstorms can be life-threatening.

Winter snow and ice can remain on the trails well into May, making hiking hazardous or impossible without special equipment. The compacting of snow due to winter recreation on the more frequently used trails tends to lengthen the time it takes for the snow and ice to melt off. Stabilizers, crampons, ice axes, ski poles, and snowshoes may be helpful or necessary for winter and early spring ascents, depending on ice and snow cover.

Fall hiking generally requires warmer clothing, an awareness of weather conditions, and earlier ascent times. As there are no reliable water sources on the mountain and little shelter from the sun above 2,000 feet (610 m), dehydration and heat stroke are potential hazards.

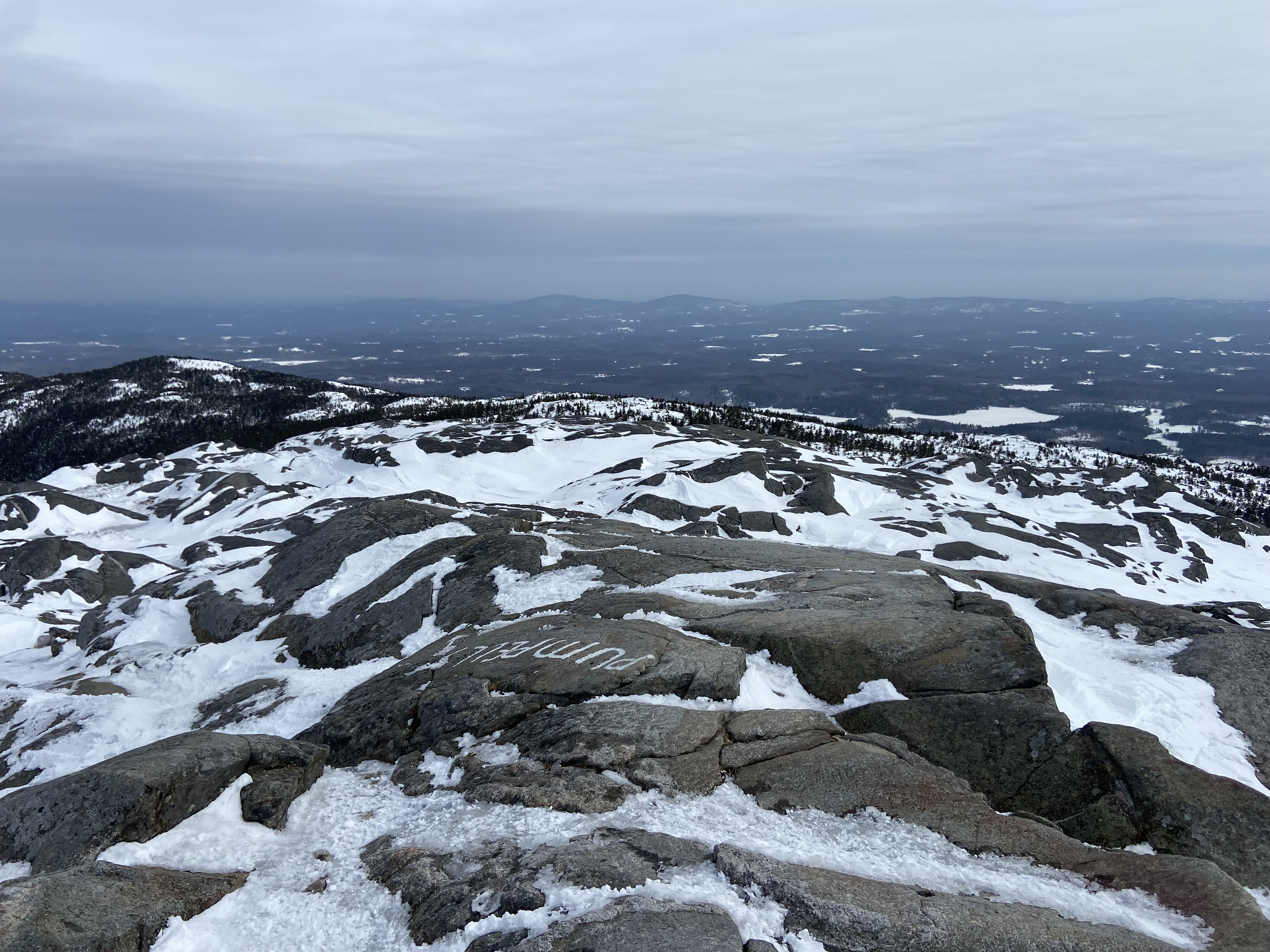
The view from the summit in mid-March, with large snowbanks visible. The word "Pumpelly", painted on a rock, is the name of one trail.

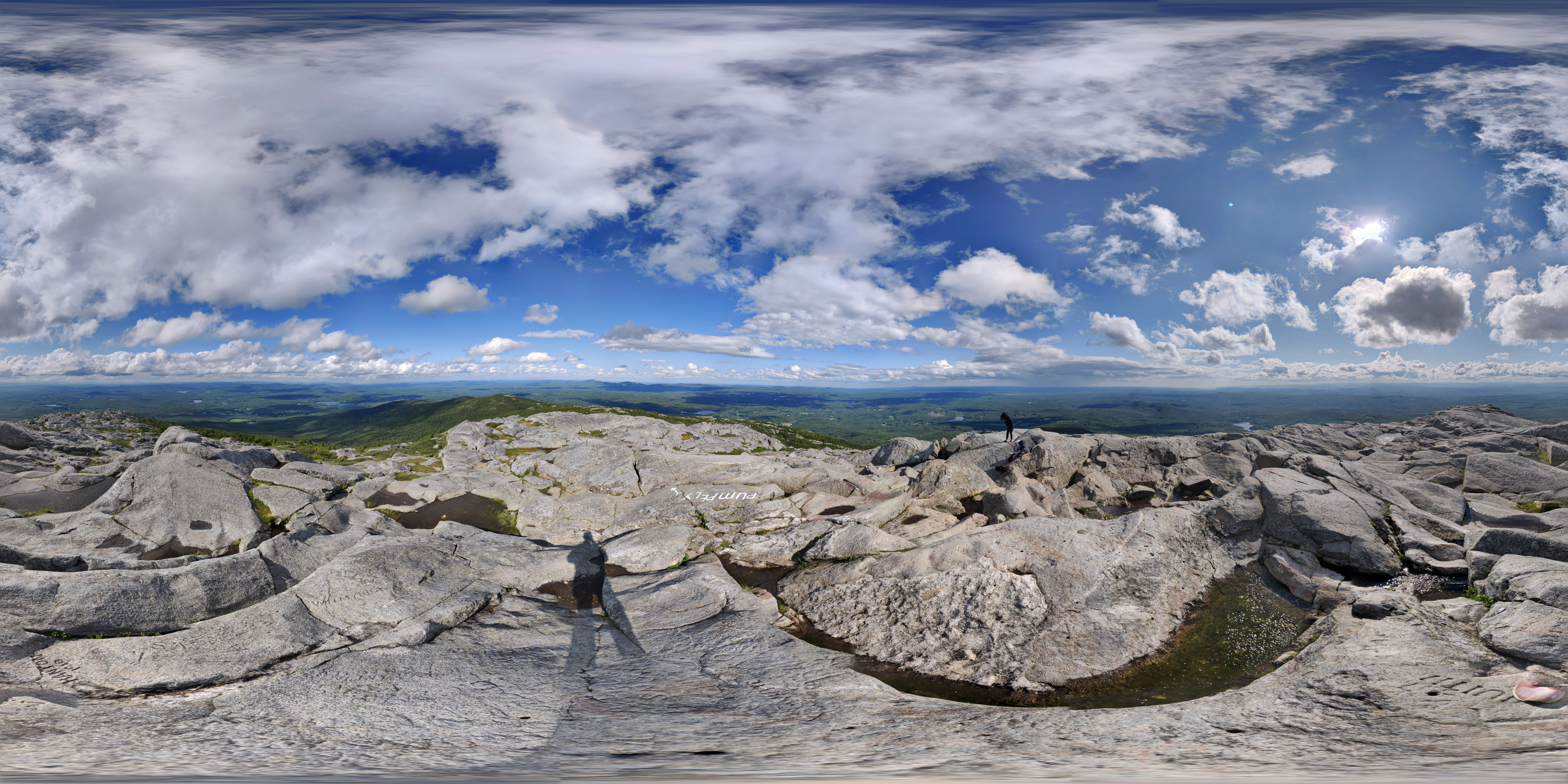
The summit on a late July afternoon (view as a 360° interactive panorama)

The mountain and surrounding area are black bear habitat, although problem encounters with bears are rare.

Advice on hiking can be solicited from Memorial Day through Columbus Day and select off-season weekends at the park headquarters on the southeast side of the mountain. Trail descriptions and maps of Mount Monadnock are published by a variety of sources. The Society for the Protection of New Hampshire Forests prints a guidebook with maps, trail descriptions, history, geology, ecology, and other trivia on the mountain.

== Conservation ==
Most of the mountain has been protected and is not subject to development. The Society for the Protection of New Hampshire Forests is the major landowner, holding over 4,000 acres (16 km^{2}) in its Monadnock Reservation. Lands on Monadnock are leased to the state for management purposes. An additional 1,000 acres (4.0 km^{2}) on the mountain are owned directly by the state of New Hampshire as Monadnock State Park. The town of Jaffrey also owns portions of the mountain.

In 2000, the Metacomet-Monadnock Trail was included in a study by the National Park Service for possible inclusion in a new National Scenic Trail. The resulting New England National Scenic Trail includes the Mattabesett and Metacomet trails in Connecticut and the Massachusetts portion of the Metacomet-Monadnock Trail, giving it some of the status accorded to the Appalachian Trail. However, the New Hampshire section of the Metacomet-Monadnock Trail was not included in the final NST designation.

== Tributes ==
Beside Emerson and Thoreau, other artists and writers have been inspired by Mount Monadnock, including:

- William Preston Phelps (1848–1917) was known as "the Painter of Mount Monadnock".
- Many other American artists have painted Mount Monadnock, among them Abbott Handerson Thayer, Rockwell Kent and Richard Whitney.
- The American composer Alan Hovhaness (1911–2000), who climbed Mount Monadnock several times during his youth, composed the symphonic fantasy entitled Monadnock, Op. 2, No. 1, circa 1935.
- H. P. Lovecraft, the early 20th century writer of horror, science fiction and fantasy, authored the poem "To Templeton and Mount Monadnock".
- Galway Kinnell, a Pulitzer Prize–winning poet, wrote the poem "Flower Herding on Mount Monadnock".
- Poet Edwin Arlington Robinson, who summered in Monadnock's shadow from 1911 to 1934, wrote the poem "Monadnock Through the Trees".
- Part of the yearly Mount Monadnock Celebration of Dance takes place on the summit of Mount Monadnock at the autumn equinox.

Several United States Navy ships were named USS Monadnock in the nineteenth and twentieth centuries.

In 1961, F. Nelson Blount established the Monadnock, Steamtown & Northern Railroad, a local steam-powered tourist railroad named after the mountain and Steamtown USA, Blount's accompanying steam museum. The MS&N operated in the region until 1967, when it was folded in with the Green Mountain Railroad. An image of the peak made up the railroad's logo.

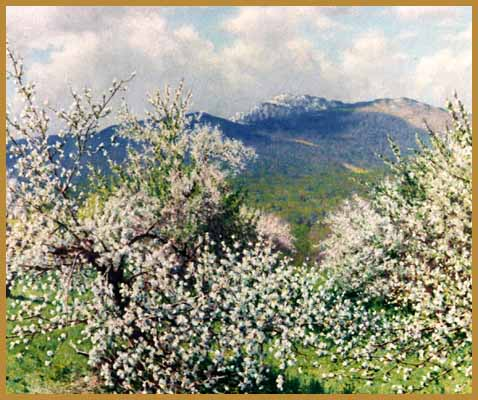
Mount Monadnock as painted by Richard Whitney in the painting Monadnock Orchard

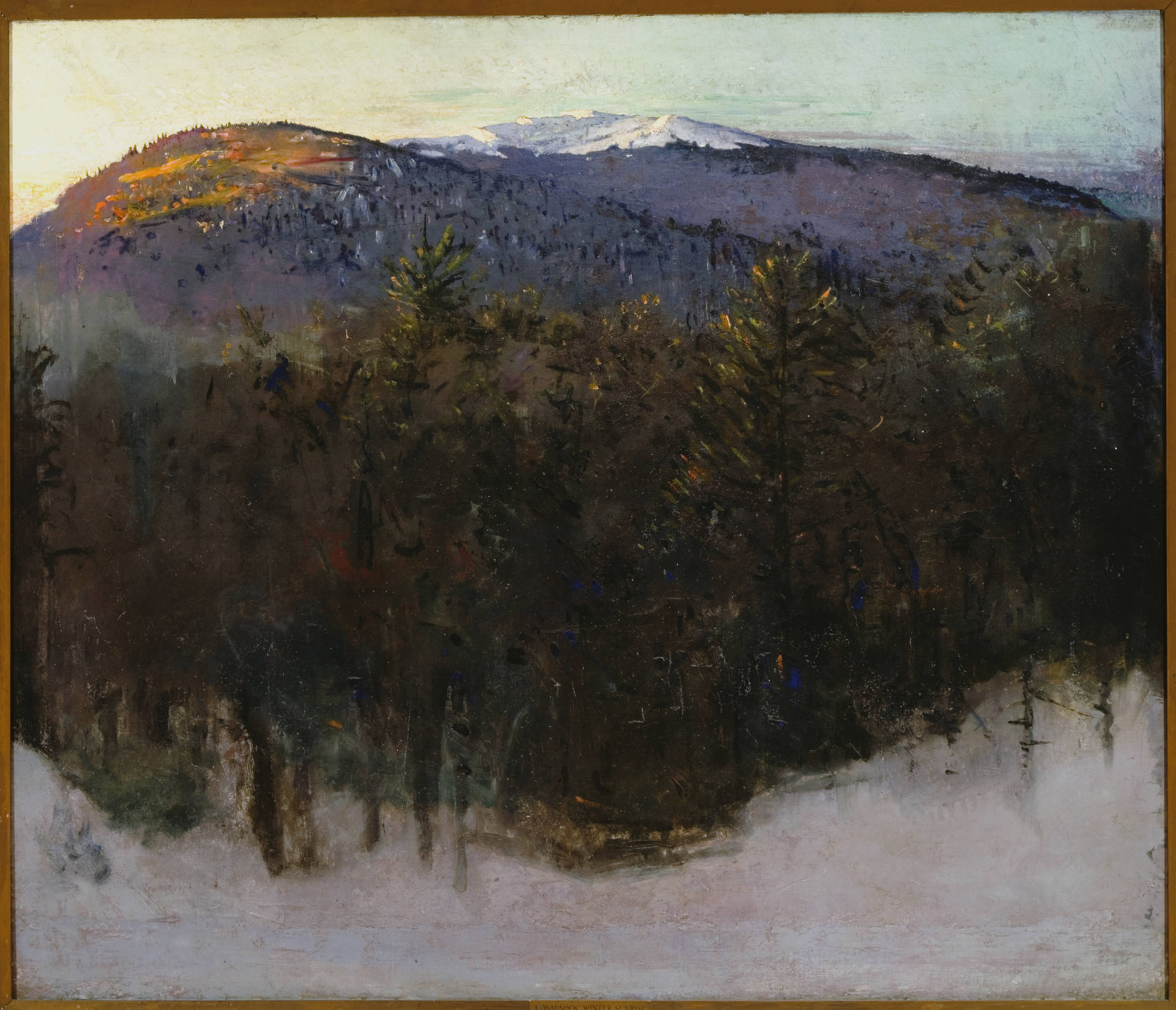
Abbott Handerson Thayer, Monadnock, Winter Sunrise, 1919, Princeton University Art Museum

== Other nearby peaks named Monadnock ==
- Pack Monadnock and North Pack Monadnock are two peaks in the Wapack Range, 11 miles (18 km) to the east across the Contoocook River valley from Mount Monadnock, in Greenfield and Peterborough, New Hampshire. Pack is a Native American word for "little".
- Little Monadnock Mountain is a peak located 7 miles (11 km) southwest of Mount Monadnock in Troy and Fitzwilliam, New Hampshire. Like Mount Monadnock, it is crossed by the Metacomet-Monadnock Trail.
- Monadnock Mountain is the name of a mountain in the Northeast Kingdom of Vermont.

== See also ==
- New England Fifty Finest
- Society for the Protection of New Hampshire Forests
