= Wantastiquet Mountain =

Mountain in New Hampshire

Coordinates: 42°51′25″N 72°32′25″W

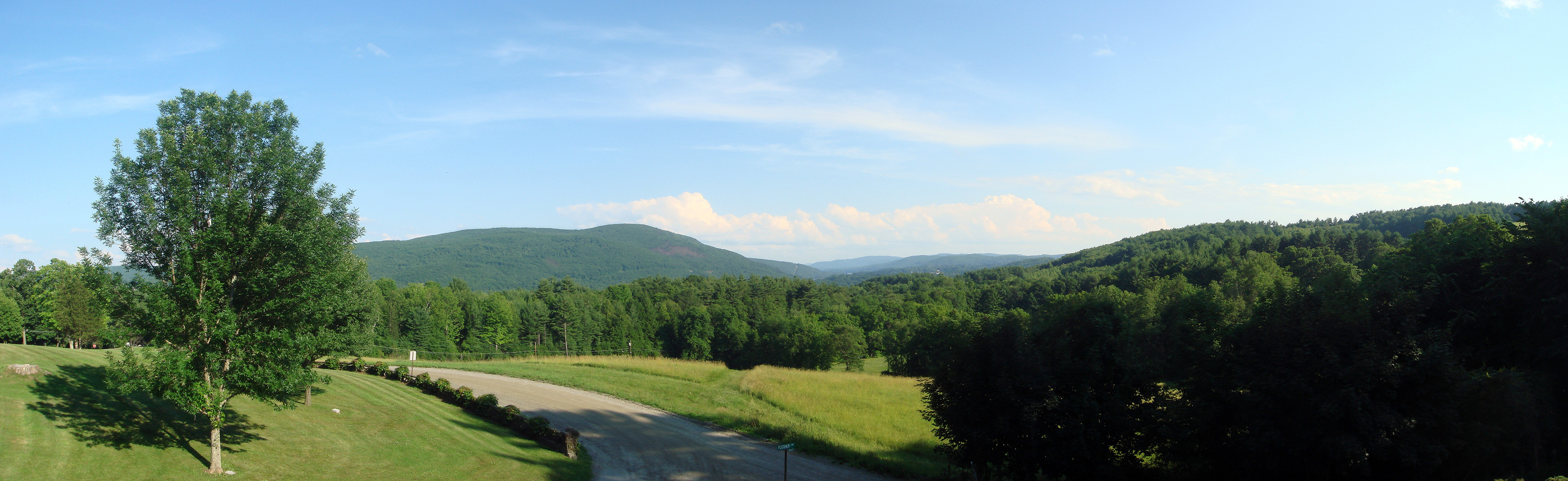
View of Wantastiquet Mountain from the School for International Training in Brattleboro, Vermont

Wantastiquet Mountain is in New Hampshire by the Connecticut River near Brattleboro, Vermont. Conventional wisdom holds that its name means "west river", but researchers reported the name means river where it is easy to get lost. The mountain has also been known as Chesterfield Mountain and Rattlesnake Mountain. It was home to timber rattlers. It is 1,335 feet high. There is a trail to its summit that passes by former quartzite mines. Wantastiquet Mountain State Forest is 520 acres. The mountain is along the 50 mile Wantastiquet-Monadnock Trail and Greenway. The trail extends to Mount Monadnock. The Wantastiquet Mountain Natural Area covers 1,000 acres and includes the Walter H. Child Monument.

It is in the extreme southwest corner of Chesterfield, New Hampshire at the northwest corner of Hinsdale, New Hampshire across the river from Vermont.

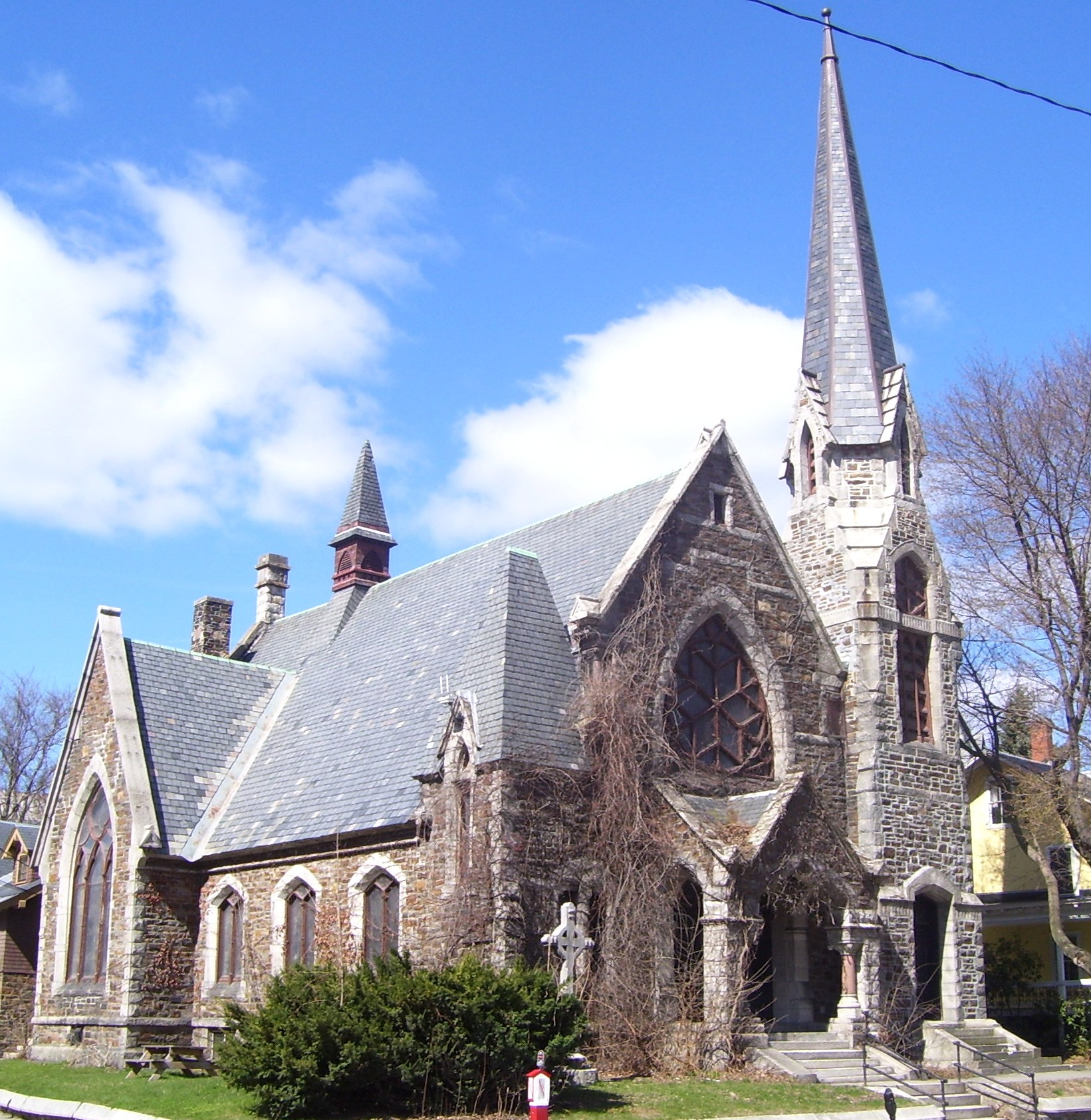
The Stone Church in Brattleboro, Vermont

Trails up the mountain offer views of the Connecticut River Valley, Brattleboro, Vermont and the Vermont Mountains. Madame Sherri Forest is nearby.

A path to the summit was established in the 1840s and a carriage road to the area in 1891. A log cabin offered water cures. Bands reportedly played on the mountain with the sound carrying to those below. In 1924 a cross was burned on it while Ku Klux Klan organizers were in the area. Radio stations and a weather station were installed on it. A 100-foot cable tower topped the mountain until being taken down around 2023.

All Souls Unitarian Church in Brattleboro, Vermont was built of Quartzite from the mountain. It is now The Stone Church theater.
