= Richard Whitney (artist) =

American painter

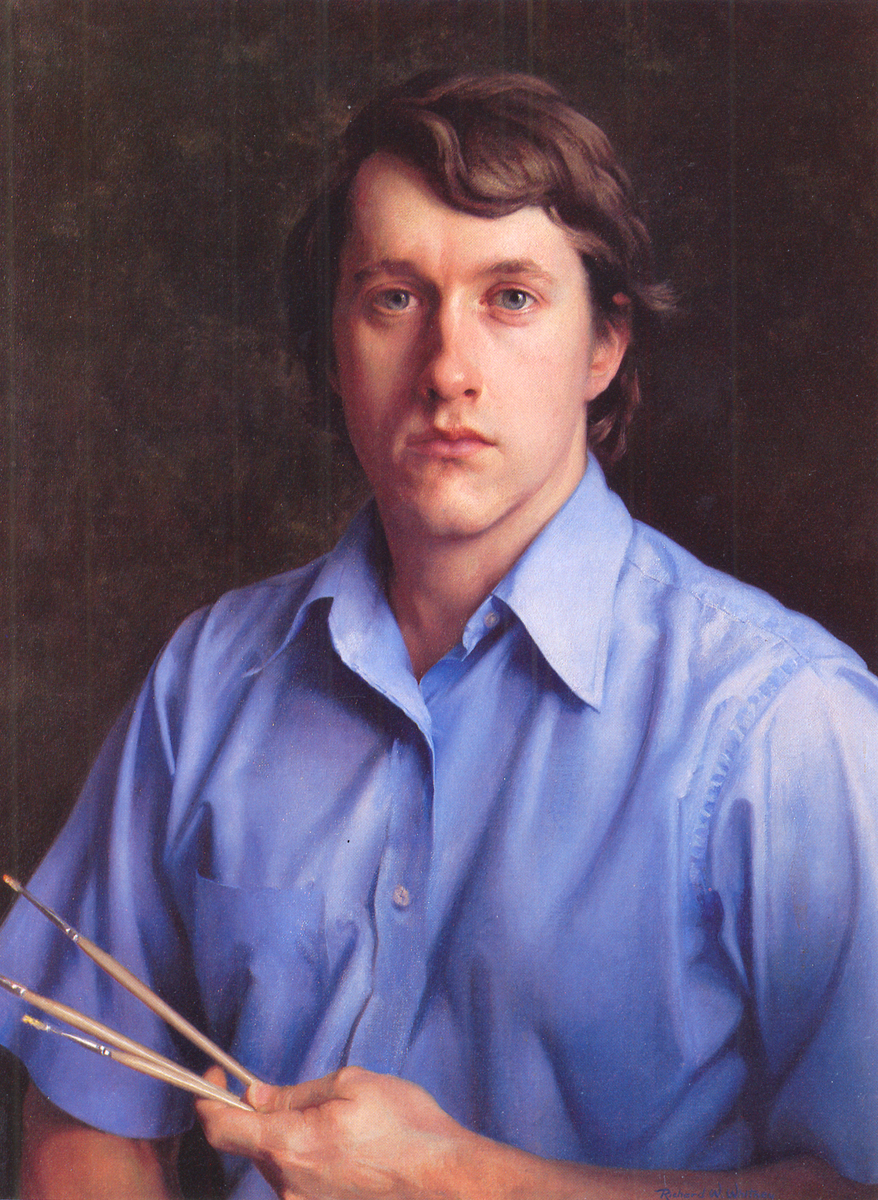
"Self Portrait", oil, 26 x 20, 1973. Collection: Newark Museum

Richard Whitney (born 1946 in Vermont), is an American painter, author and educator known for his portrait work. Town & Country magazine has named him one of the top dozen portrait painters in America. Fine Art Connoisseur has called him one of "the giants of the field" of figurative painting.

Whitney graduated Phi Beta Kappa from the University of New Hampshire in 1968. He studied with Sidney F. Willis and with the Boston painter R. H. Ives Gammell. Whitney has published Gammell's letters to him in the book Advice to a Young Artist.

Whitney's portraits and landscapes are included in over 800 collections and he has won over 50 regional and national awards. He received an Honorary Doctor of Fine Arts Degree from the University of New Hampshire in 2015.

Whitney is the author of the book Painting the Visual Impression which summarizes the basic principles of representational painting. He is also a co-author of the book Realism in Revolution: The Art of the Boston School and has published a retrospective of his work titled The Art of Richard Whitney.

== Professional organizations ==
- American Artists Professional League - Honorary Lifetime Member
- Copley Society - Lifetime Membership
- The Guild of Boston Artists

== Gallery of work ==
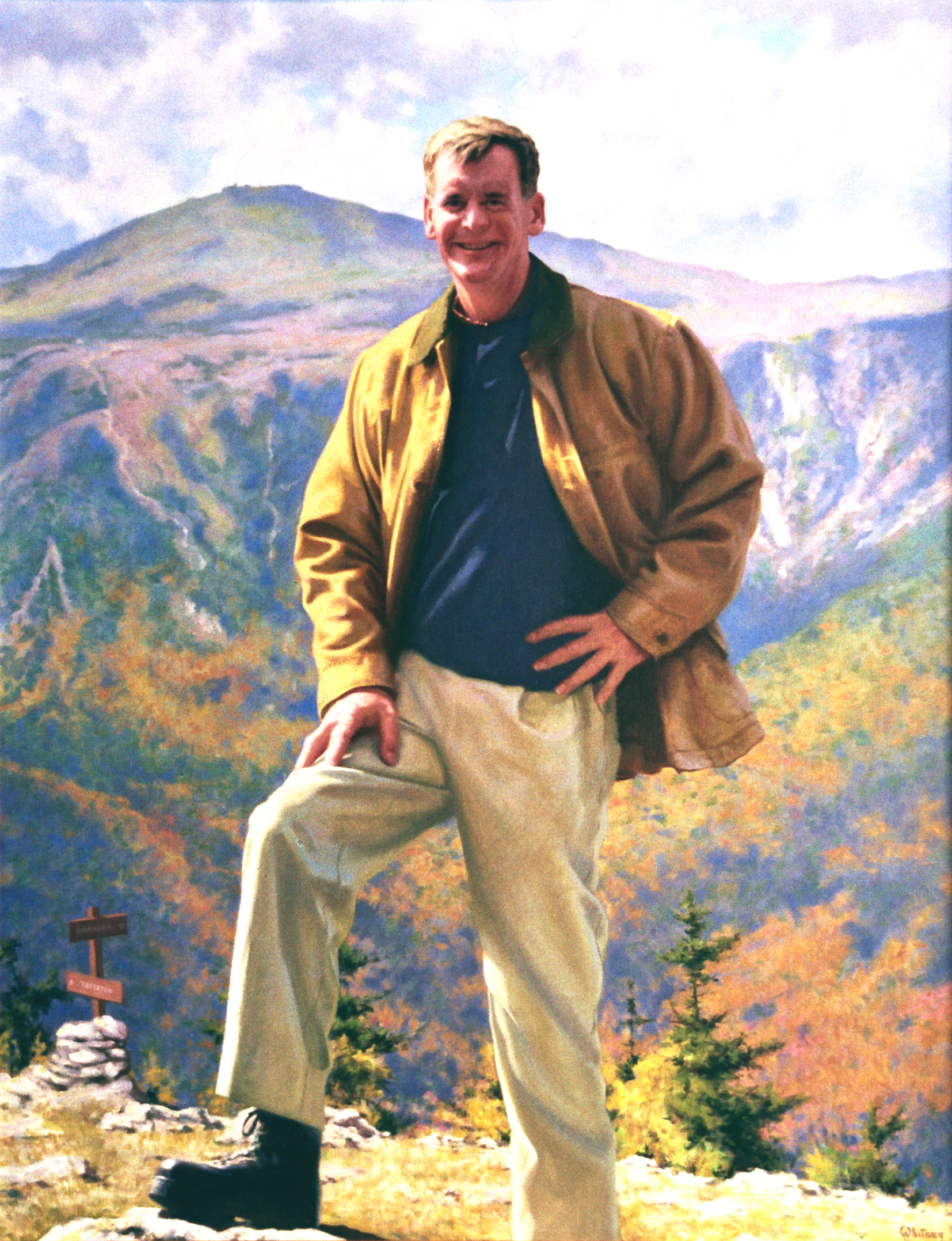
Judd Gregg

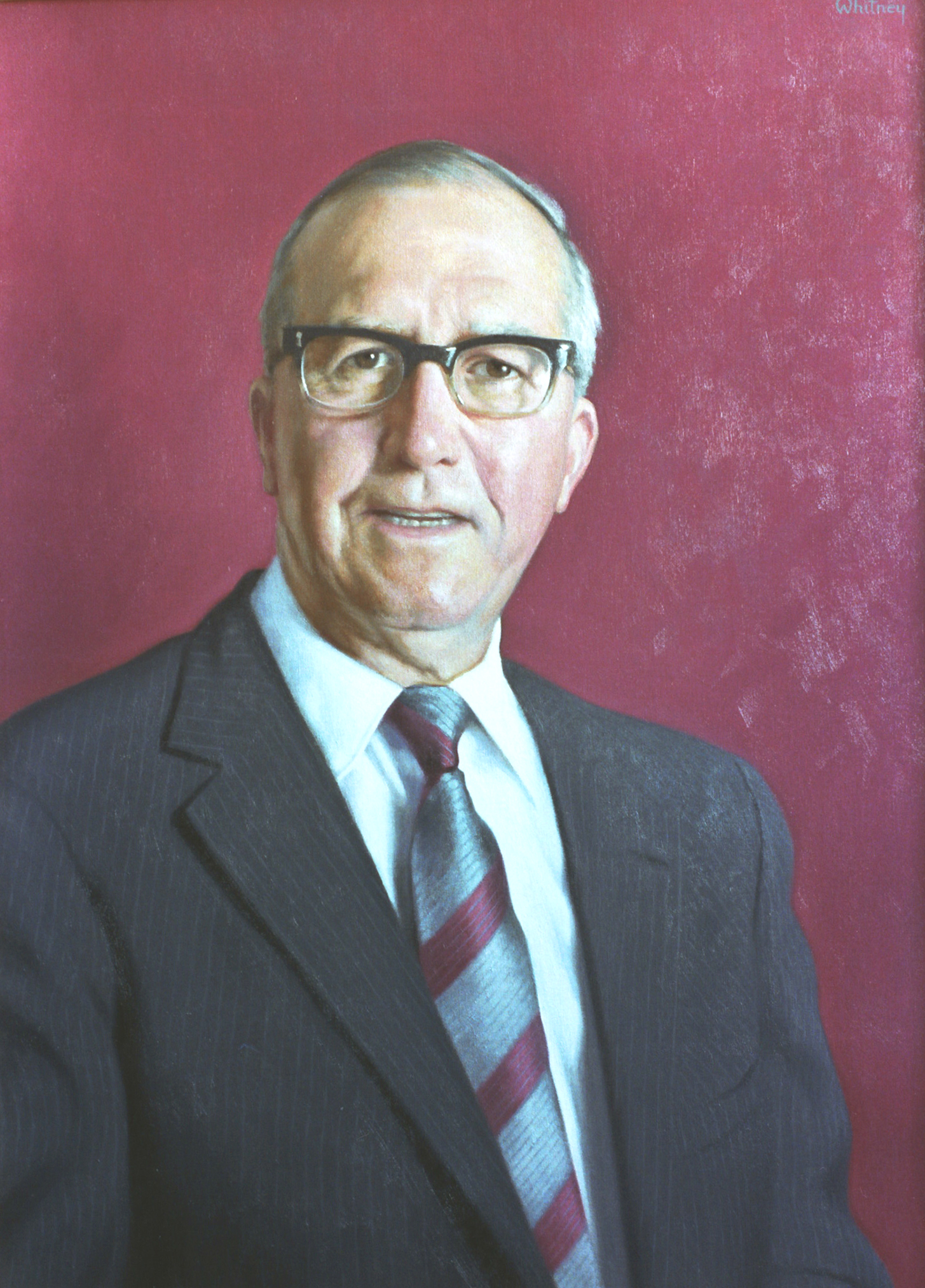
John W. King

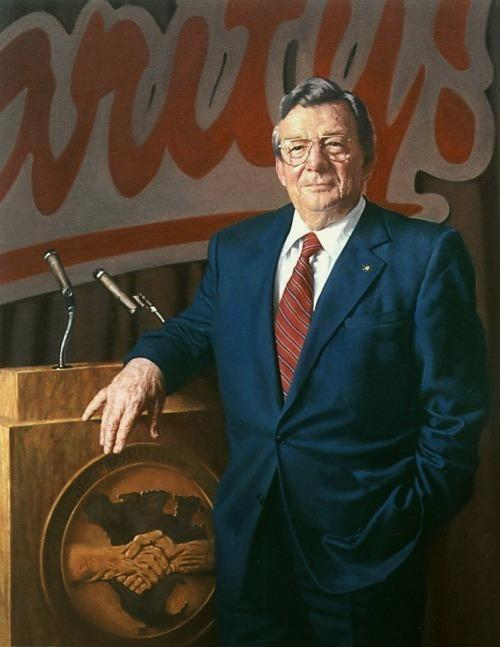
Lane Kirkland

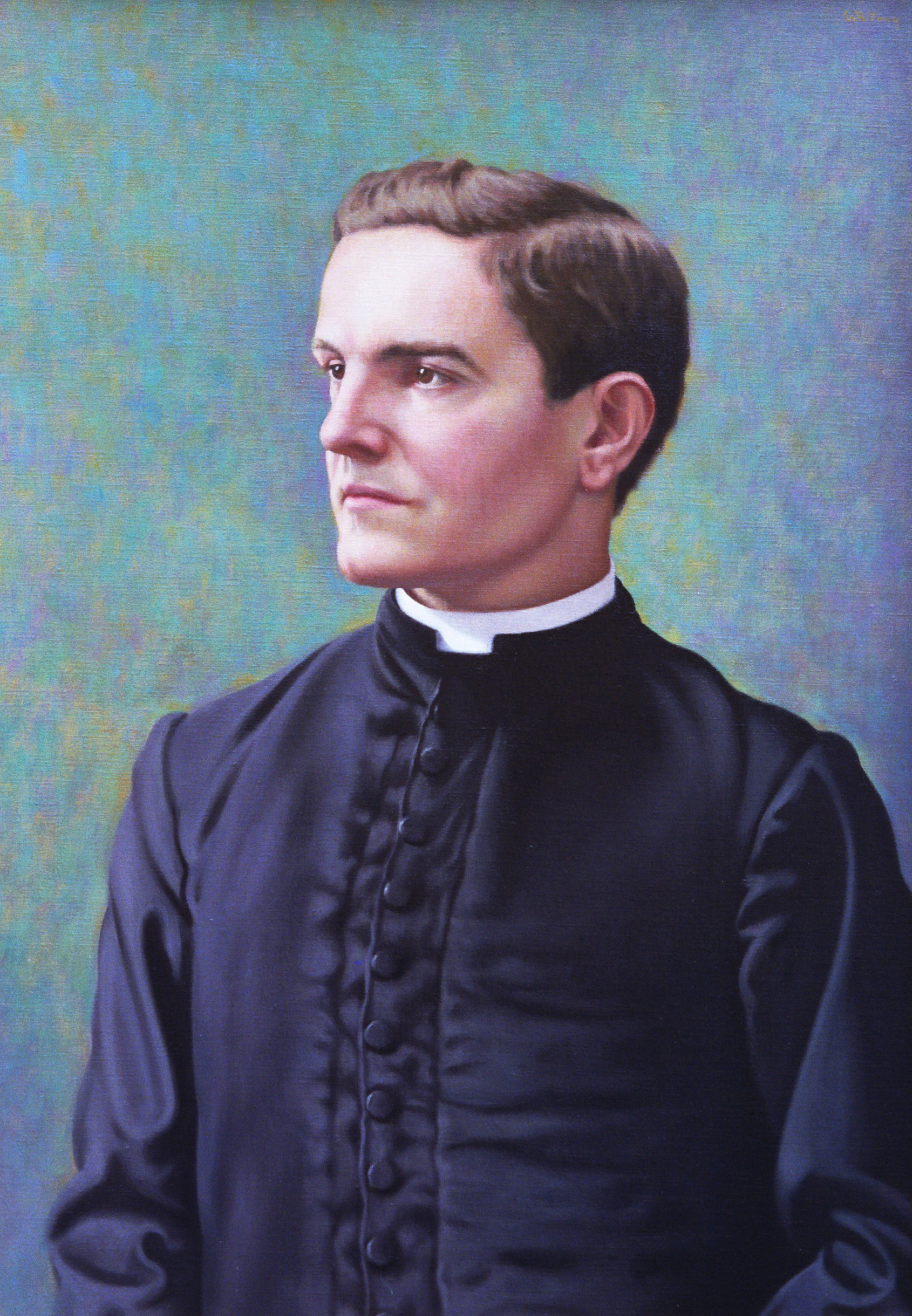
Michael J. McGivney

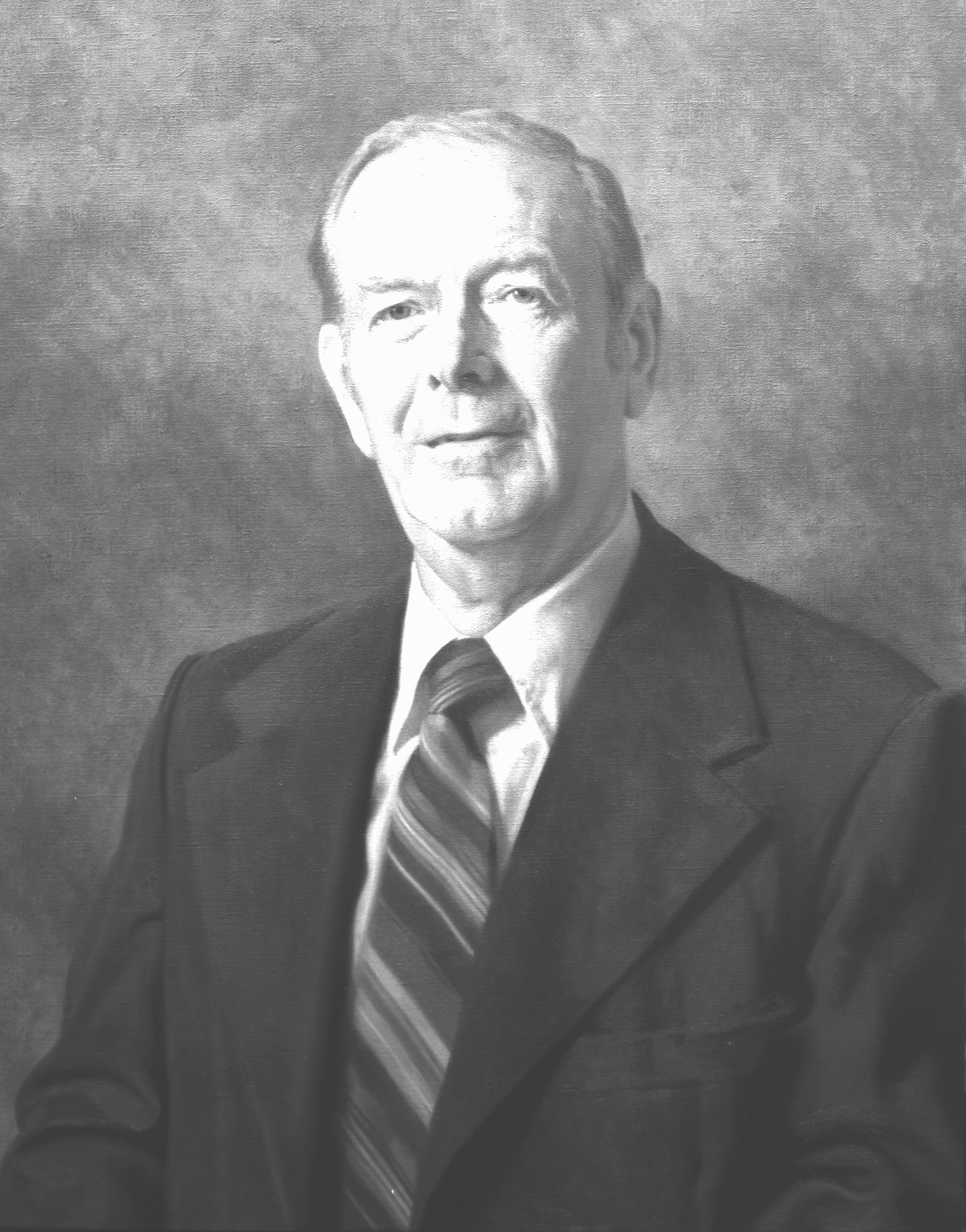
Thomas J. McIntyre

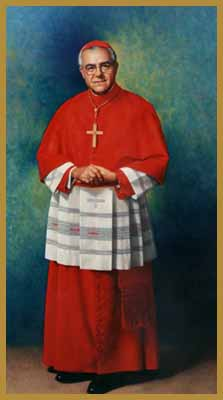
Humberto Sousa Medeiros

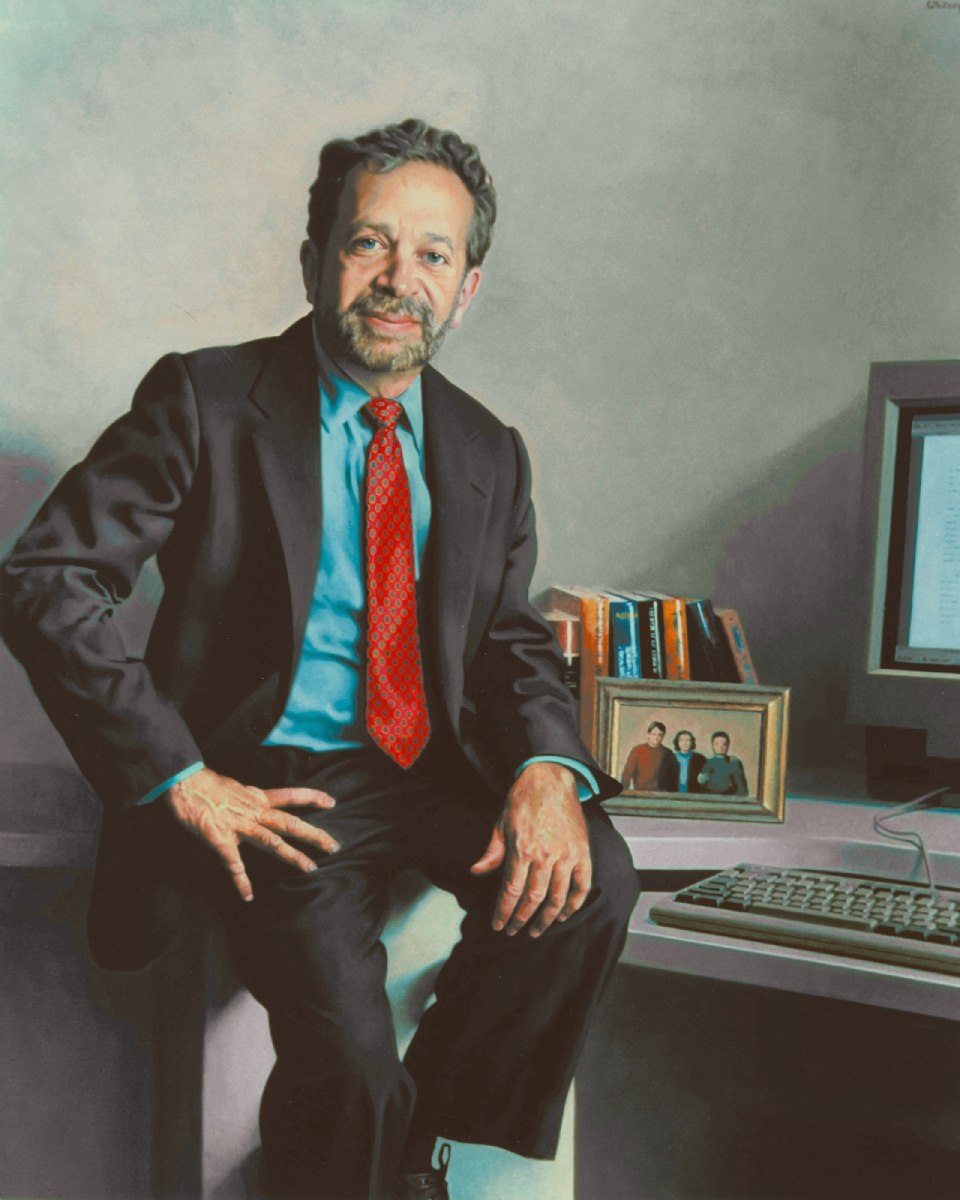
Robert Reich

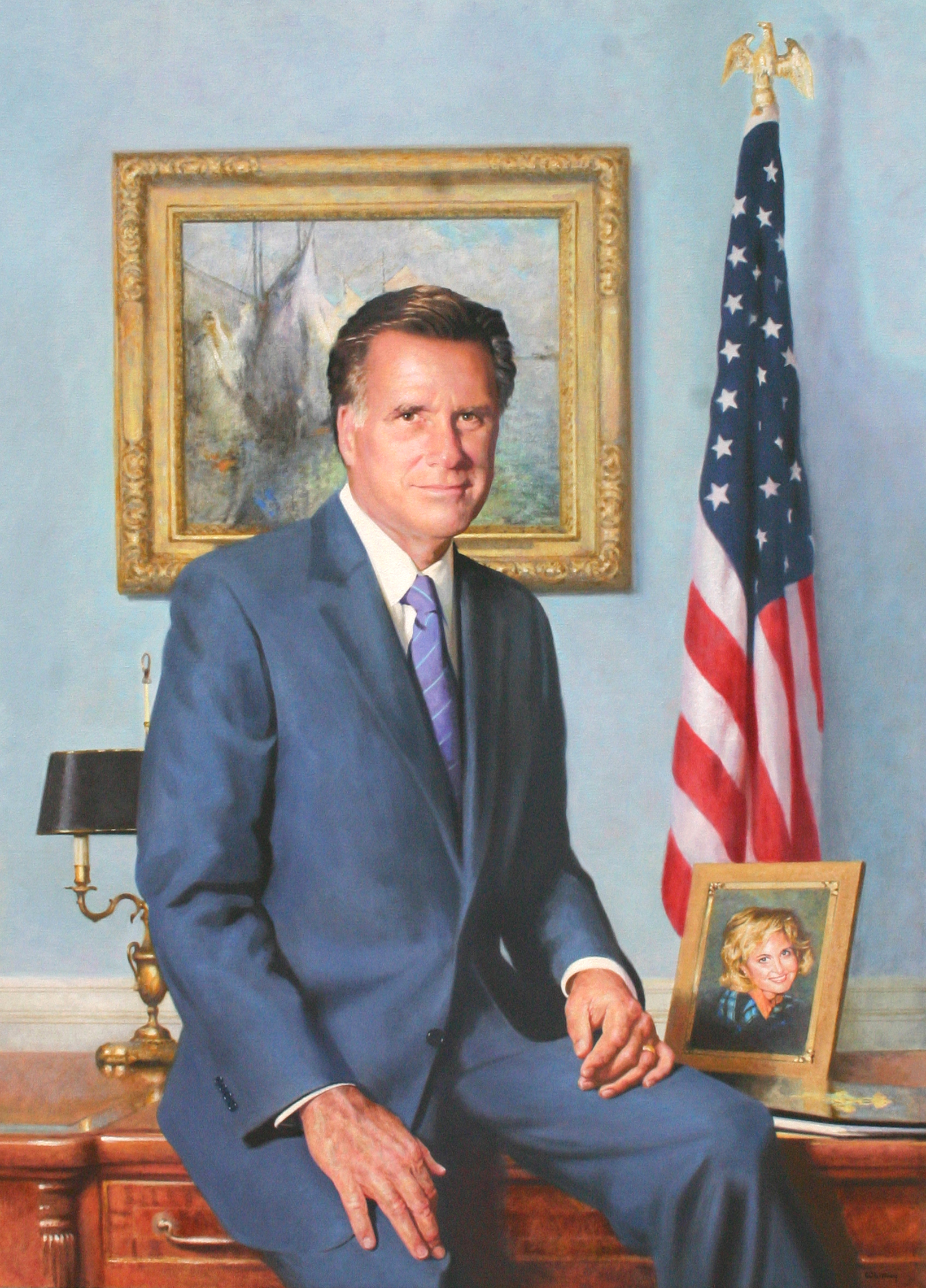
Mitt Romney

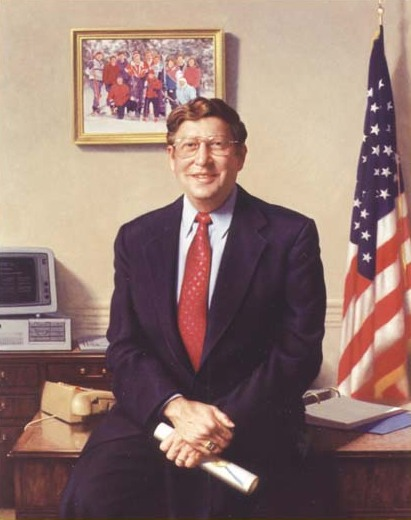
John H. Sununu

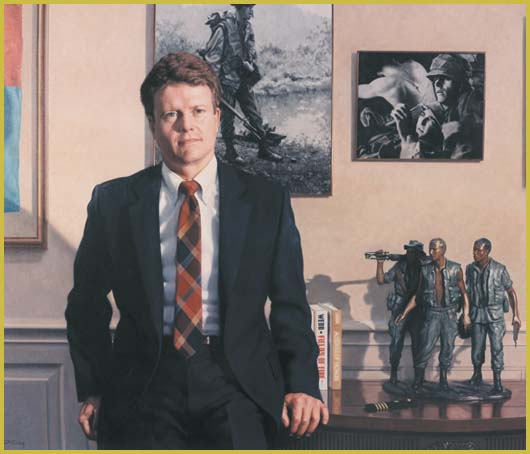
James H. Webb
