= History of Boston =

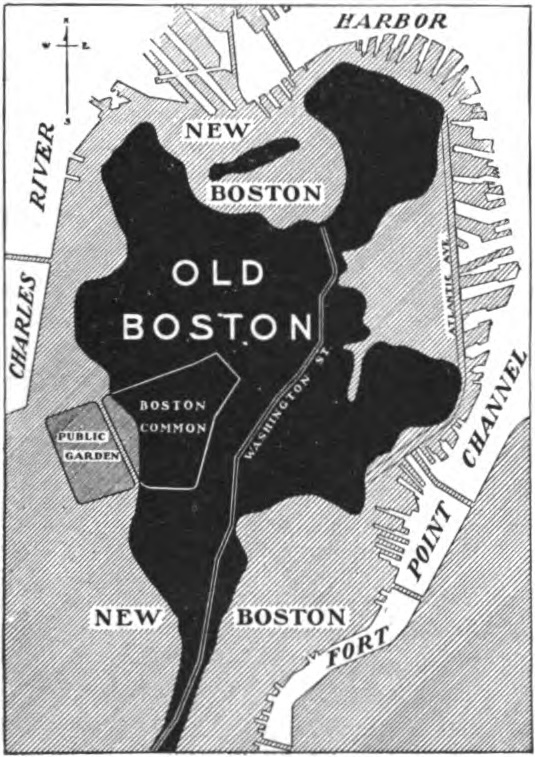
This diagram shows the original dimension of the Shawmut Peninsula. The gray areas marked with the words "New Boston" are the product of the period of land reclamation that began in 1803, coinciding with the first of the many commodity booms experienced by the city. The area marked Boston Common corresponds to William Blaxton's original property.

The written history of Boston begins with a letter drafted by the first European inhabitant of the Shawmut Peninsula, William Blaxton. This letter is dated September 7, 1630, and was addressed to the leader of the Puritan settlement of Charlestown, Isaac Johnson. The letter acknowledged the difficulty in finding potable water on that side of Back Bay. As a remedy, Blaxton advertised an excellent spring at the foot of what is now Beacon Hill and invited the Puritans to settle with him on Shawmut.

Boston was named and officially incorporated on September 30, 1630 (Old Style). The city quickly became the political, commercial, financial, religious and educational center of Puritan New England and grew to play a central role in the history of the United States.

When harsh British retaliation for the Boston Tea Party resulted in further violence by the colonists, the American Revolution erupted in Boston. Colonists besieged the British in the city, fighting a famous battle at Breed's Hill in Charlestown on June 17, 1775—a battle lost by the colonists but one that inflicted great damage on British forces. The colonists later won the Siege of Boston, forcing the British to evacuate the city on March 17, 1776. However, the combination of American and British blockades of the town and its port during the conflict seriously damaged the economy, leading to the exodus of two-thirds of its population in the 1770s.

The city recovered after 1800 and re-established its role as the transportation hub for New England with a network of railroads. Beyond a renewed economic success the re-invigorated Boston became the intellectual, educational and medical center of the nation. Along with New York, Boston became the financial center of the United States in the 19th century, and the large amount of capital available there for investment was crucial in funding the expansion of a nationwide railroad.

During and before the Civil War Boston was the launching pad and funding base for many of the country's anti-slavery activities. In the 19th century city politics and society became dominated by a financial elite known as the Boston Brahmins. This entrenched power base squared off against the political challenge of more recent Catholic immigrants for the rest of the 19th century. Wealthy Irish Catholic political dynasties, typified by the Kennedy Family, assumed political control of the city by 1900. This control has been substantially maintained for more than a century, however this power has swayed as Boston continues to become more diverse.

The industrial base of the region, financed by Boston capital, reached its zenith around 1950. The city went into decline after the middle of the 20th century when thousands of textile mills and other factories were closed down as the United States began a long deindustrialization. By the early 21st century the city's economy recovered, moving from an industrial base to one centered on financial services, education, medicine, and high technology, especially biotechnology startups. The many towns surrounding Boston became residential suburbs that now house the city's large population of white collar workers.

== Indigenous era ==
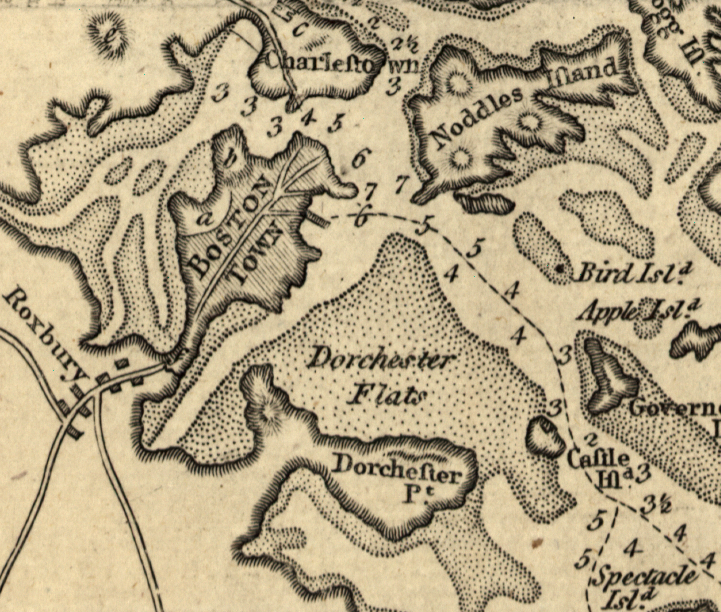
A map of Boston and Boston Harbor in 1782; the dotted features are mudflats and salt marshes that were exposed at low tide and unnavigable even at high tide.

Prior to European colonization the region around modern-day Boston was inhabited by the Indigenous Massachusett people. Their habitation consisted of small, seasonal communities along what is now the Charles River. The river was accurately named Quinobequin in the Algonquin language of the Massachusett, and they knew it as "the meandering one". The people who lived in the area most likely moved between inland winter homes along the meanders of the Charles and summer communities on the coast. Game was most easily hunted inland during bare-tree seasons while the fishing shoals and shellfish beds on the tidal flats of Boston harbor were more comfortably exploited during the summer months.

Being surrounded by mudflats and salt marshes, the Shawmut Peninsula itself was more sparsely occupied than its surroundings before the arrival of Europeans. Nevertheless, archeological excavations have revealed one of the oldest fish weirs in New England on Boylston Street. Native people constructed this weir to trap fish as early as 7,000 years before European arrival in the Western Hemisphere.

The Shawmut Peninsula was originally connected with the mainland to its south by a narrow isthmus, Boston Neck, and was surrounded by Boston Harbor and Back Bay, an estuary of the Charles River. This neck of land was surrounded by infill beginning in 1803 and expanded to dozens of times its original width by the turn of the 20th century.

== Foundation by Europeans ==
=== Blaxton Era (1624–1630) ===
The first European to live in what would become Boston was William Blaxton. He was directly responsible for the foundation of Boston by Puritan colonizers in 1630. Blaxton had joined the failed Ferdinando Gorges expedition to America in 1623, which never landed. He eventually arrived later in 1623, as a chaplain to the subsequent expedition of Ferdinando's son, Robert Gorges, aboard the ship Katherine. This expedition landed in Weymouth, Massachusetts, five miles south of what is now Boston.

By 1625 the colony at Weymouth had failed and all of his fellow travelers returned to England. Blaxton remained, moving five miles north to a 1 mi^{2} rocky bulge at the end of a swampy isthmus surrounded on all sides by mudflats. Blaxton thus became the first colonist to settle in what would become Boston. He lived at the Western end of the Shawmut Peninsula at the foot of what is now Beacon Hill and was entirely alone for more than five years.

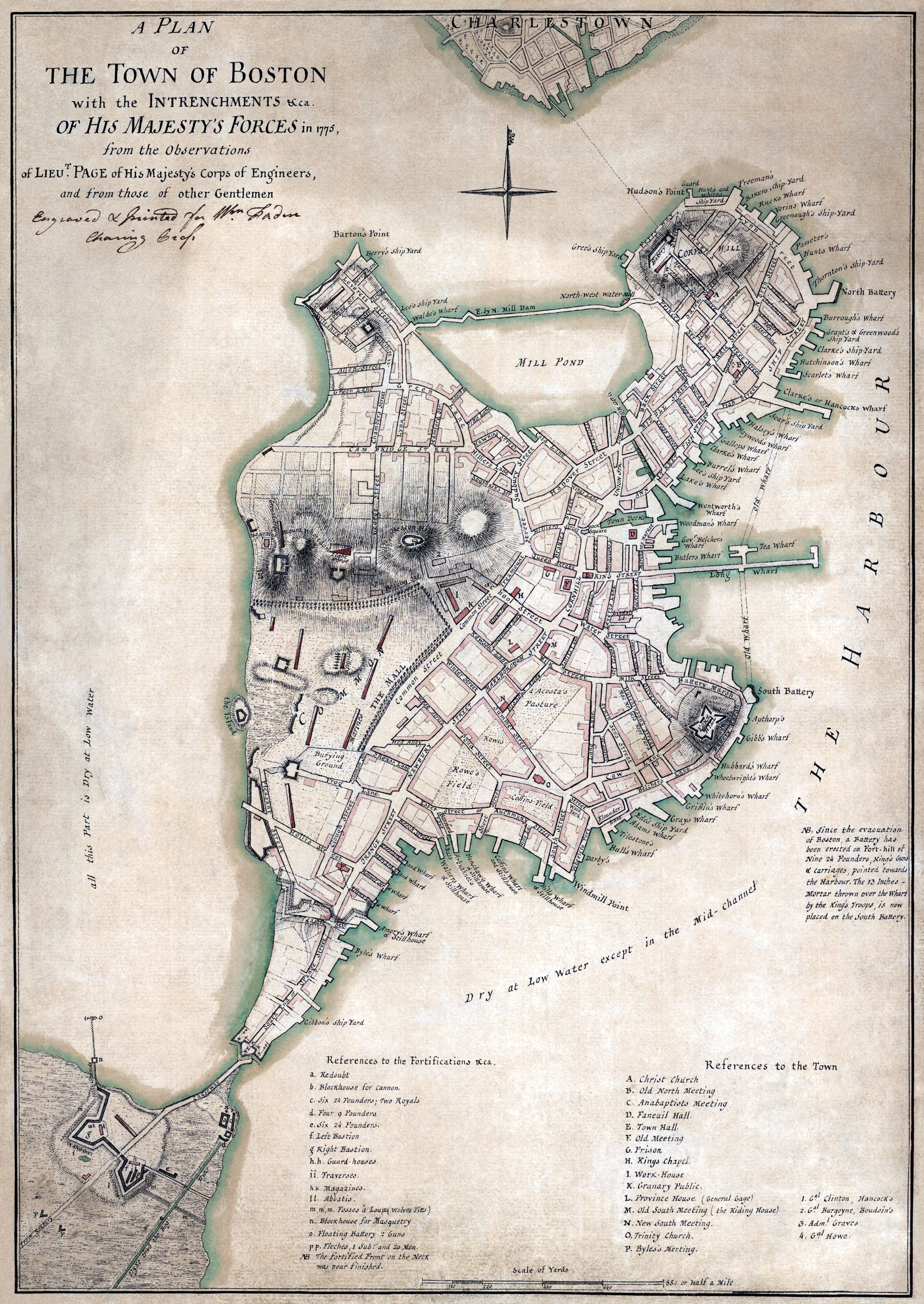
A British artillery survey of Boston from 1775 showing the Mount Whoredom peak of Trimountaine just north of Boston Common.

=== Puritan Era (1630–1750) ===
==== Invitation from Blaxton ====
In 1629 Isaac Johnson landed with the Puritans in nearby Charlestown, having left Salem for want of food. Blaxton and Johnson had been university contemporaries at Emmanuel College, Cambridge. The rockier highlands of Charlestown lacked easily tappable wells. Knowing of this difficulty, Blaxton wrote a historic letter in September 1630 to Johnson and his group of Puritans that advertised the peninsula's excellent natural spring, and invited them to settle on his land. This they did over the course of September 1630.

==== Renamed "Boston" ====
One of Johnson's last official acts as the leader of the Charlestown community before dying on September 30, 1630, was to name the new settlement across the river "Boston." He named the settlement after his hometown in Lincolnshire, from which he, his wife (namesake of the Arbella) and John Cotton (grandfather of Cotton Mather) had emigrated to New England. The name of the English city ultimately derives from that town's patron saint, St. Botolph, in whose church John Cotton served as the rector until his emigration with Johnson. In early sources the Lincolnshire Boston was known as "St. Botolph's town", later contracted to "Boston". Prior to this renaming the settlement on the peninsula had been known as "Shawmut" by Blaxton and "Trimountaine" by the Puritan settlers he had invited.

==== Settlement on Shawmut Peninsula ====
The Puritans settled around the advertised springs on the north side of what is now Beacon Hill (at the time called "Trimountaine" from its three peaks). Blaxton negotiated a grant of 50 acres (20 ha) for himself in the final paperwork with Johnson, amounting to around 10% of the peninsula's total area. However, by 1633 the new town's 4,000 citizens made retention of such a large parcel untenable and Blaxton sold all but six acres back to the Puritans in 1634 for £30 ($5,455 in adjusted USD). Governor Winthrop, Johnson's successor as leader of the settlement, purchased the land through a one-time tax on Boston residents of 6 shillings (around $50 adjusted) per head. This land became a town commons open to public grazing. It now forms the bulk of Boston Common, the largest public park in present-day downtown Boston.

After Johnson's death the Episcopalian Blaxton did not get along with the Puritan leaders of the Boston church, which rapidly became radically fundamentalist in its outlook once it began executing religious dissidents such as Quakers. In 1635 Blaxton moved about 35 miles (56 km) south of Boston to what the Indians then called the Pawtucket River and is today known as the Blackstone River in Cumberland, Rhode Island. He was that region's first European settler, arriving one year before Roger Williams established Providence Plantations.

==== Original topography of the peninsula ====
The peninsula on which the Puritans settled was rocky scrubland with few trees. It held three major hills: Copps Hill (now the North End), Fort Hill (later the Financial District), and Trimountaine (Beacon Hill). Trimountaine was the tallest of the three, with its name coming from its three separate peaks. The name was retained for the hill and in later years Trimountaine would be shortened to Tremont, for which Tremont Street was named.

The three peaks of Trimountaine were,

1. Cotton Hill—named for John Cotton, and later renamed Pemberton Hill (now Pemberton Square),
2. Centry or Sentry Hill—the present location of the Massachusetts State House, and
3. Mount Whoredom—also known as Mount Vernon, now the location of Louisburg Square, home to some of the most expensive real estate in the nation.

Over the next two centuries the three hills would be regraded and the geography of the area transformed through landfill and annexation. Beacon Hill or Trimountaine, though shortened between 1807 and 1824, remains a prominent feature of the Boston cityscape. It received its current name from the signal beacon erected on its highest peak to warn outlying towns of danger.

==== Response to 1684 charter revocation ====
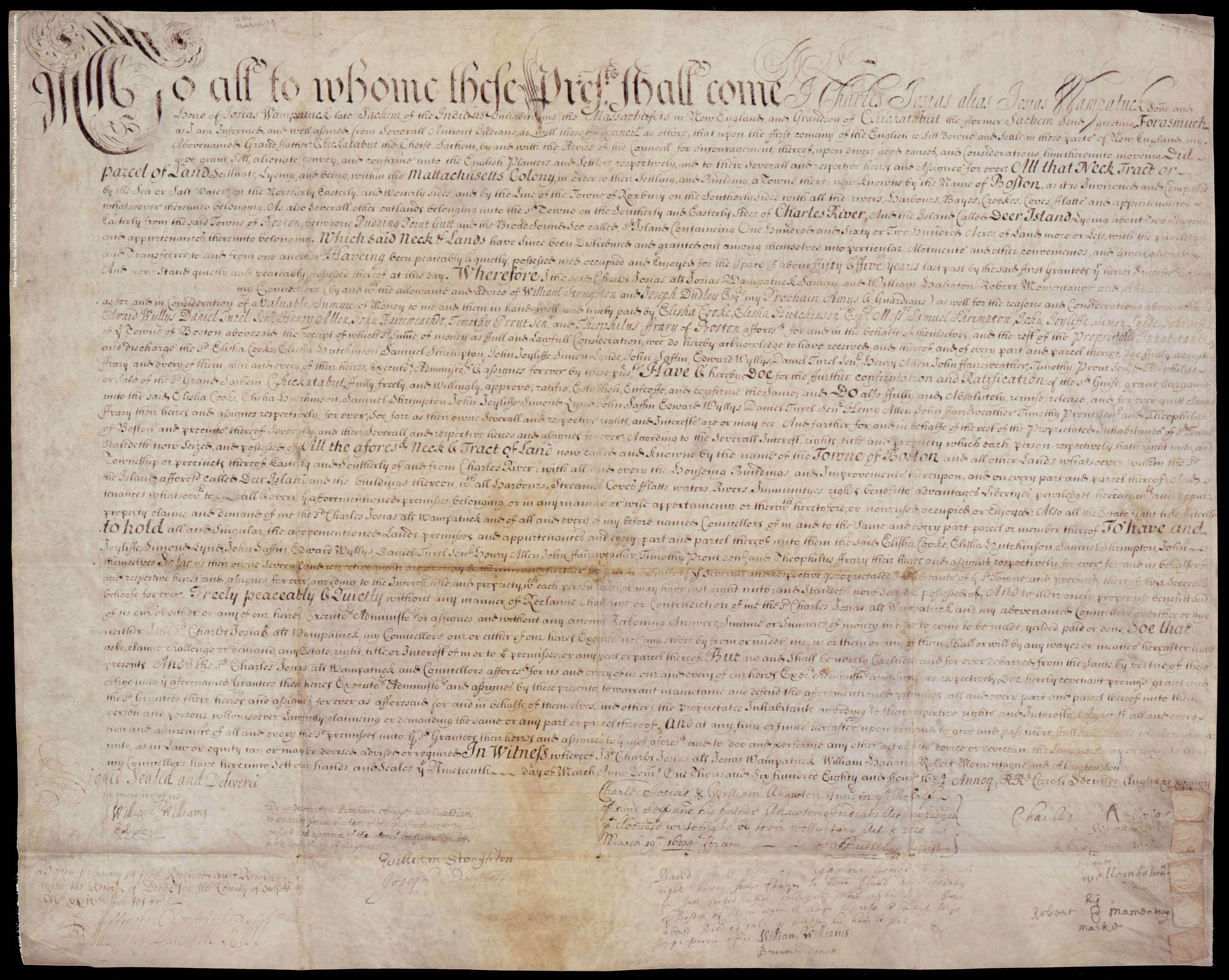
Quitclaim obtained by Boston city fathers in 1684 from a local sachem, backdating their ownership of the Shawmut Peninsula to 1630 and the city's foundation.

In 1684, fearing that the rumored revocation of the Massachusetts Bay Colony's Charter by King Charles II would come to pass, Boston city fathers sought to buttress their fifty year old claim to the land of the Shawmut Peninsula. To this end in early 1684 they attempted to secure legal ownership of the Shawmut Peninsula from the descendents of Chickatawbut (d. 1633), the Massachusett sachem at the time Blaxton first settled on the peninsula, fifty years prior. Such a descendent was located, a sachem named Josias Wampatuck. There is little evidence that this sachem, his grandfather Chickatawbut or any of their people ever inhabited the peninsula, however the lack of formal legal documents involving Indians during the Blaxton transactions encouraged the creation of a backdated deed (known in English common law as a "quitclaim") which Josias duly signed on March 19, 1684 (see document at right, and its transcription). The charter was revoked as promised later that year on the advice of colonial administrator Edward Randolph.

== Colonial era ==
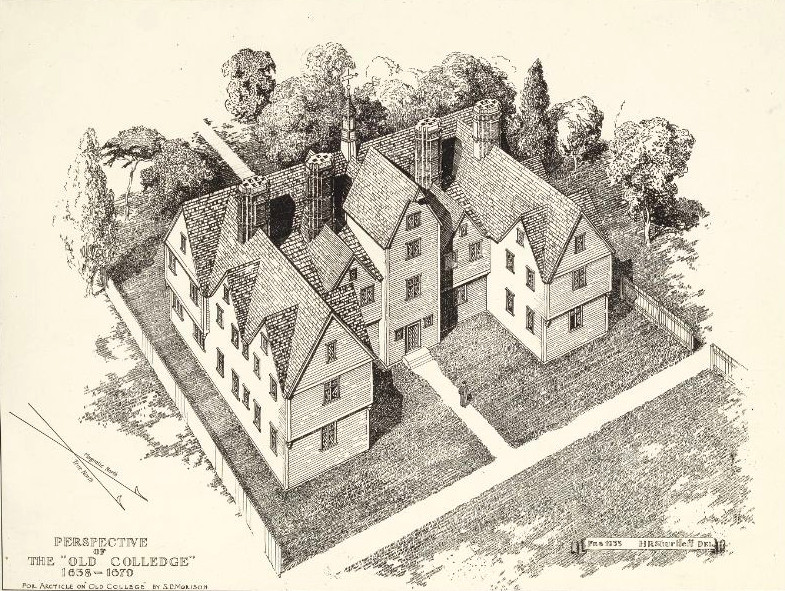
The 1638 building of Harvard College

Early colonists believed that Boston was a community with a special covenant with God, as captured in Winthrop's "City upon a Hill" metaphor. This influenced every facet of Boston life, and made it imperative that colonists legislate morality as well as enforce marriage, church attendance, education in the Word of God, and the persecution of sinners. One of the first schools in America, Boston Latin School (1635), and the first college in America, Harvard College (1636), were founded shortly after Boston's European settlement.

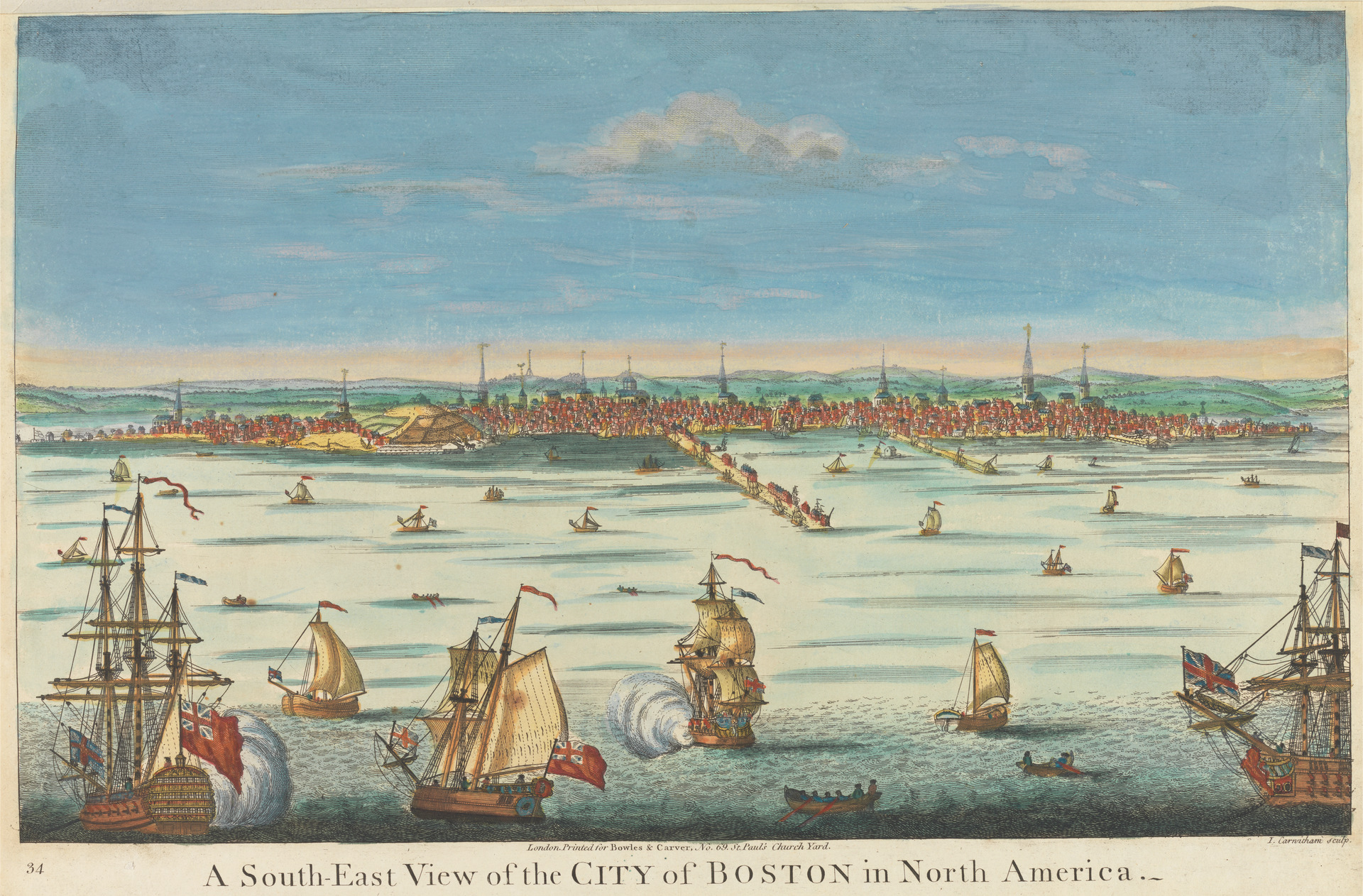
A South-East View of the City of Boston in North America, printed at London, c. 1730

Town officials in colonial Boston were chosen annually; positions included selectman, assay master, culler of staves, Fence Viewer, hayward, hogreeve, measurer of boards, pounder, sealer of leather, tithingman, viewer of bricks, water bailiff, and woodcorder.

Boston's Puritans looked askance at unorthodox religious ideas, and exiled or punished dissenters. During the Antinomian Controversy of 1636 to 1638 religious dissident leader Anne Hutchinson and Puritan clergyman John Wheelwright were both banished from the colony. Baptist minister Obadiah Holmes was imprisoned and publicly whipped in 1651 because of his religion and Henry Dunster, the first president of Harvard College during the 1640s–50s, was persecuted for espousing Baptist beliefs. By 1679, Boston Baptists were bold enough to open their own meetinghouse, which was promptly closed by colonial authorities. Expansion and innovation in practice and worship characterized the early Baptists despite the restrictions on their religious liberty. On June 1, 1660, Mary Dyer was hanged on Boston Common for repeatedly defying a law banning Quakers from being in the colony.

In 1652 during the Commonwealth of England, the Massachusetts General Court authorized Boston silversmith John Hull to produce coinage. He minted a one shilling coin known as the pine tree shilling. In 1661 after Charles II came to the throne, the English government considered the Boston mint to be treasonous. However, the mint continued operations until 1682. The coinage was a contributing factor to the revocation of the Massachusetts Bay Colony charter in 1684.

As the largest city in New England, Boston was the center of military and political activities. Boston was protected by Castle William to the southeast. It was also the center of colonial military operations during several colonial wars. The unsuccessful siege of Quebec in 1690 and the successful siege of Louisbourg in 1745 were launched from Boston.

The Boston Post Road connected the city to New York and the major settlements in Central and Western Massachusetts. The lower route ran near present-day U.S. 1 via Providence, Rhode Island. The upper route, laid out in 1673, left via Boston Neck and followed present-day U.S. Route 20 until around Shrewsbury, Massachusetts. It continued through Worcester, Springfield, and New Haven, Connecticut.

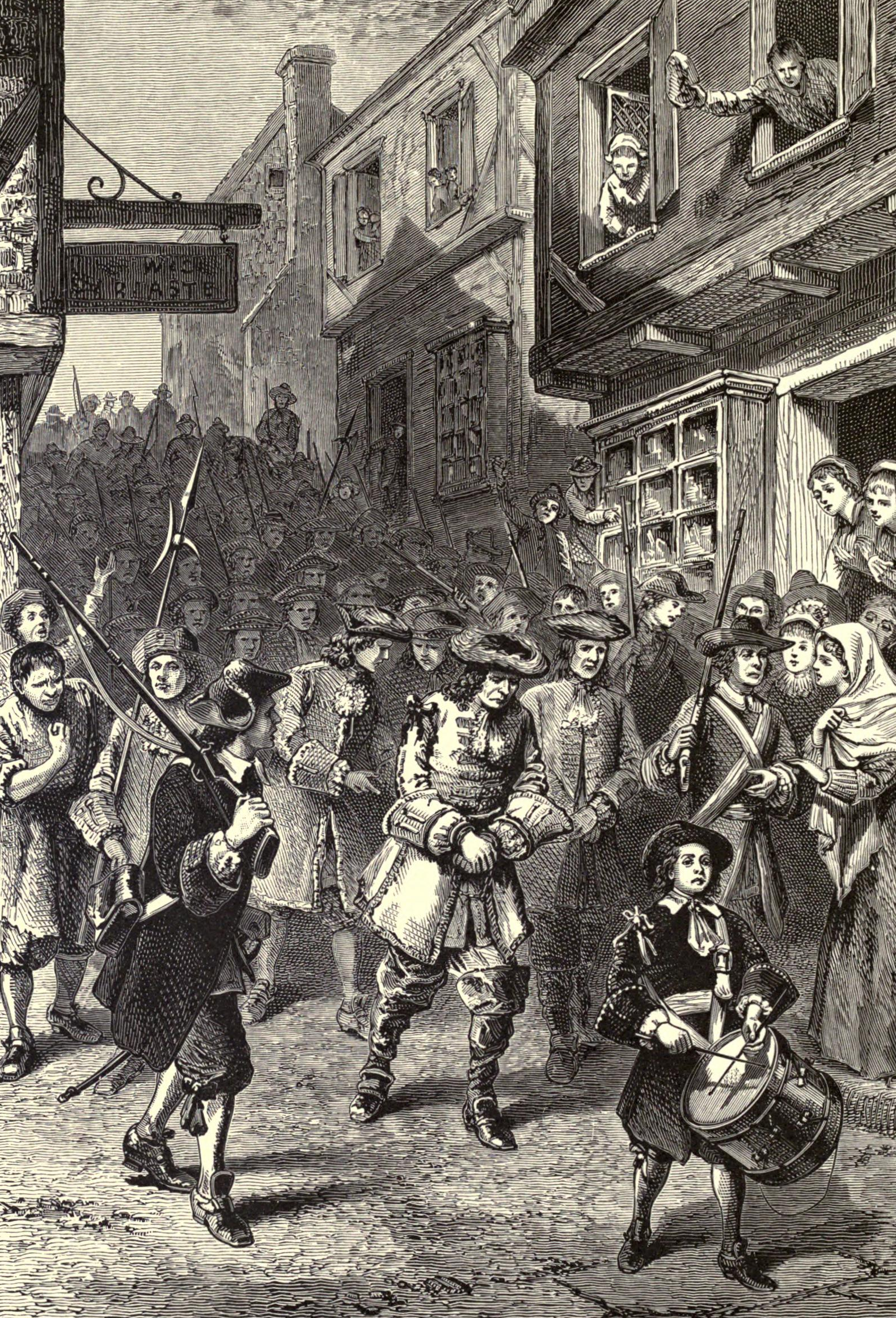
An artist's depiction of the 1689 Boston revolt

From 1686 until 1689, Massachusetts and surrounding colonies were united. This larger province, known as the Dominion of New England, was governed by Sir Edmund Andros, an appointee of King James II. Andros, who supported the Church of England in a largely Puritan city, grew increasingly unpopular. On April 18, 1689, he was overthrown due to a brief revolt. The Dominion was not reestablished.

In the midst of King George's War, Bostonians rioted against the government when Captain Charles Knowles impressed 46 men into the Royal Navy. This became known as the Knowles Riot. Rioting went on for three days from November 17-19, 1747.

Boston's first circulating library was established in 1756 which included 1,200 volumes of books. During this period, many wealthy persons amassed large libraries and loaned books within their social circles.

=== Disasters in the 1700s ===
A particularly virulent sequence of six smallpox outbreaks took place from 1636 to 1698. In 1721–1722, the most severe epidemic occurred, killing 844 people. Out of a population of 10,500, 5889 caught the disease, 844 (14%) died, and at least 900 fled the city, thereby spreading the virus. Colonists tried to prevent the spread of smallpox by isolation. For the first time in America, inoculation was tried; it causes a mild form of the disease. Inoculation was itself very controversial because of the threat that the procedure itself could be fatal to 2% of those who were treated, or otherwise spread the disease. It was introduced by Zabdiel Boylston and Cotton Mather.

In 1755, Boston endured the largest earthquake ever to hit the Northeastern United States, (estimated at 6.0 to 6.3 on the Richter magnitude scale), called the Cape Ann earthquake. There was some damage to buildings, but no deaths.

The first "Great Fire" of Boston destroyed 349 buildings on March 20, 1760. It was one of many significant fires fought by the Boston Fire Department.

== Boston and the American Revolution, 1765–1775 ==
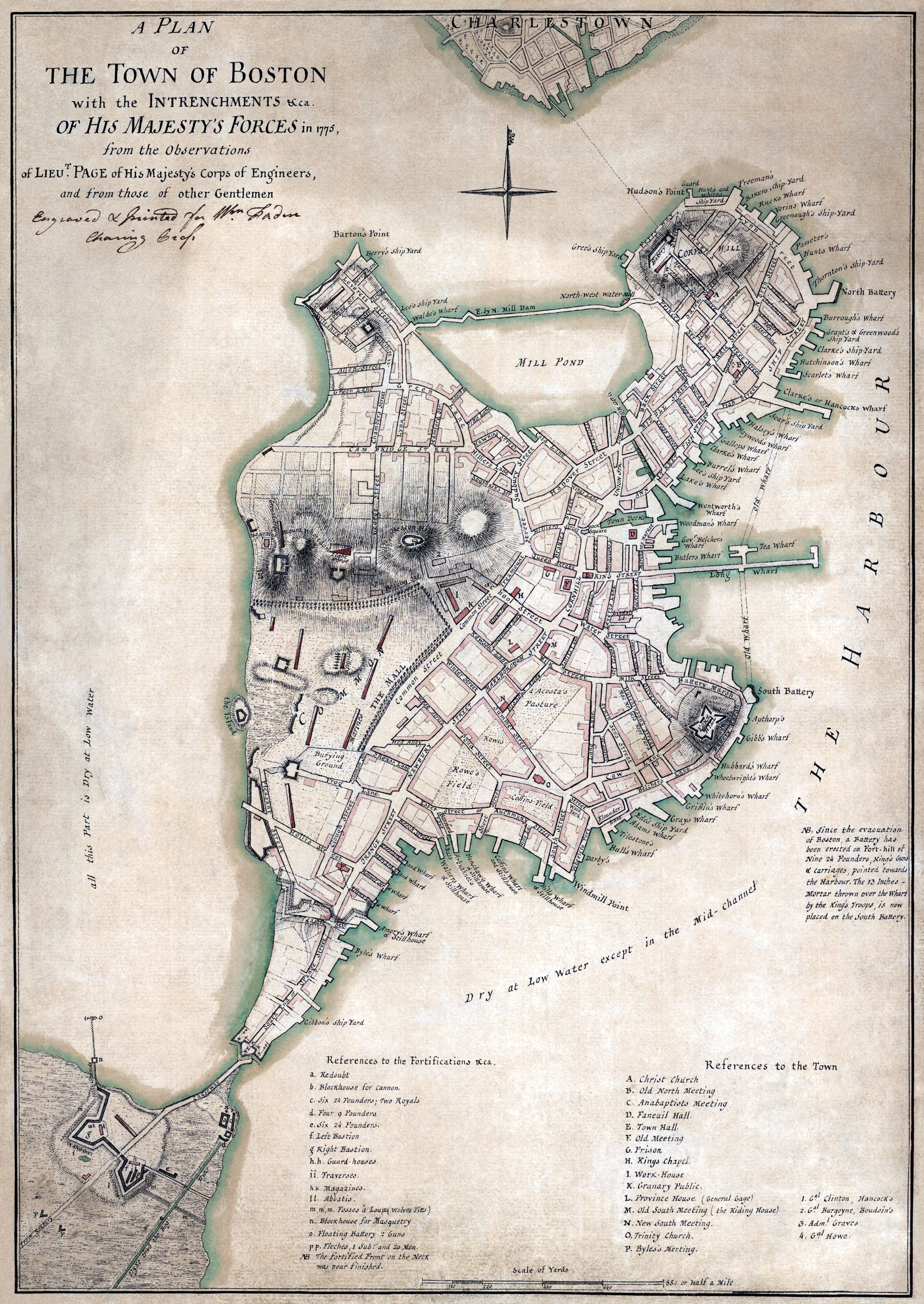
A map showing the British Army's tactical evaluation of Boston in 1775

Boston had taken an active role in the protests against the Stamp Act of 1765. Its merchants avoided the customs duties which angered London officials and led to a crackdown on smuggling. Governor Thomas Pownall (1757 to 1760) tried to be conciliatory, but his replacement Governor Francis Bernard 1760–1769) was a hard-liner who wanted to stamp out the opposition voices that were growing louder and louder in town meetings and pamphlets. Historian Pauline Maier says that his letters to London greatly influenced officials there, but they "distorted" reality. "His misguided conviction that the 'faction' had espoused violence as its primary method of opposition, for example, kept him from recognizing the radicals' peace-keeping efforts.... Equally dangerous, Bernard's elaborate accounts were sometimes built on insubstantial evidence." Warden argues that Bernard was careful not to explicitly ask London for troops, but his exaggerated accounts strongly suggested they were needed. In the fall of 1767 he warned about a possible insurrection in Boston any day, and his exaggerated report of one disturbance in 1768, "certainly had given Lord Hillsboro the impression that troops were the only way to enforce obedience in the town." Warden notes that other key British officials in Boston wrote London with the "same strain of hysteria." Four thousand British Army troops arrived in Boston in October 1768 as a massive show of force; tensions escalated.

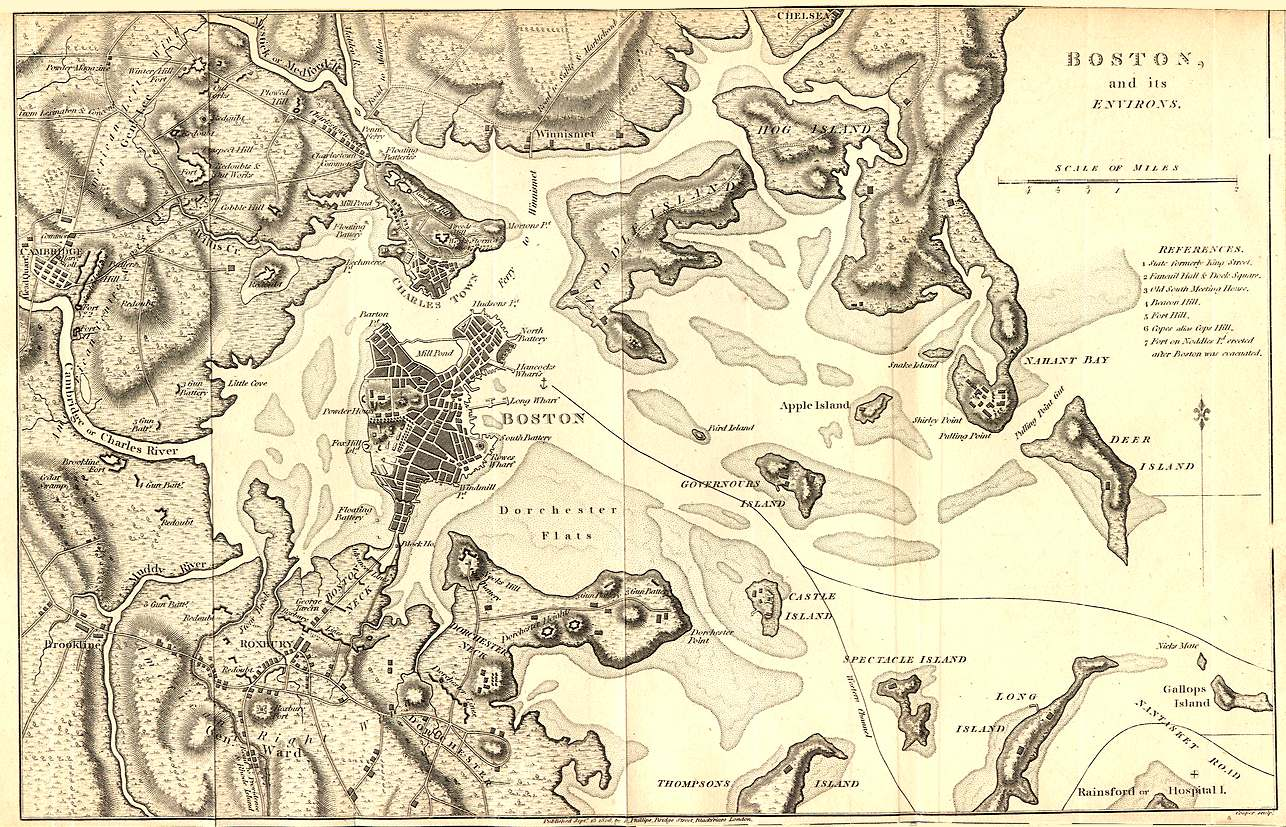
A map showing Boston and vicinity, including Bunker Hill, Dorchester Heights, and troop disposition of Gen. Artemas Ward during the Siege of Boston. From "Marshall's Life of Washington" (1806).

By the late 1760s, Patriot colonists focused on the rights of Englishmen that they claimed to hold, especially the principle of "no taxation without representation" as articulated by John Rowe, James Otis Sr., Samuel Adams and other Boston firebrands. Boston played a major role in the American Revolution, including the American Revolutionary War. On March 5, 1770, nine soldiers of the 29th Regiment of Foot opened fire at a crowd of Bostonians which was verbally and physically harassing them; five people were killed in what came to be known as the Boston Massacre, dramatically escalating tensions. The British Parliament, meanwhile, continued to insist on its right to tax the Britain's North American colonies and finally came up with a small tax on tea. Up and down the Thirteen Colonies, American colonists prevented merchants from selling the tea, but a shipment arrived in Boston Harbor. On December 16, 1773, members of the Sons of Liberty, disguised as Native Americans, dumped 342 chests of tea in the harbor in the Boston Tea Party. The Sons of Liberty decided to take action to defy Britain's new tax on tea, but the British government retaliated with a series of punitive laws, closing down the Port of Boston and stripping Massachusetts of its self-government. The other colonies rallied in solidarity behind Massachusetts, setting up the First Continental Congress, while arming and training militia units. The British sent more troops to Boston, and made its commander General Thomas Gage the governor. Gage believed the Patriots were hiding munitions in the town of Concord, and he sent troops to capture them. Paul Revere, William Dawes, and Dr. Samuel Prescott made their famous midnight rides to alert the Minutemen in the surrounding towns, who fought the resulting Battle of Lexington and Concord in April 1775. It was the first battle of the American Revolution.

Militia units across New England rallied to the defense of Boston, and Congress sent in General George Washington to take command. The British were trapped in the city, and suffered very heavy losses in their victory at the Battle of Bunker Hill. Washington brought in artillery and forced the British out as the patriots took full control of Boston. The American victory on March 17, 1776, is celebrated as Evacuation Day. The city has preserved and celebrated its revolutionary past, from the harboring of the USS Constitution to the many famous sites along the Freedom Trail.

== 19th century ==
Historical population
Year	Pop.	±%
1722	10,567	—
1765	15,520	+46.9%
1790	18,320	+18.0%
1800	24,937	+36.1%
1810	33,787	+35.5%
1820	43,298	+28.1%
1830	61,392	+41.8%
1840	93,383	+52.1%
1850	136,881	+46.6%
1860	177,840	+29.9%
1870	250,526	+40.9%
1880	362,839	+44.8%
1890	448,477	+23.6%
1900	560,892	+25.1%
1910	670,585	+19.6%
1920	748,060	+11.6%
1930	781,188	+4.4%
1940	770,816	−1.3%
1950	801,444	+4.0%
1960	697,197	−13.0%
1970	641,071	−8.1%
1980	562,994	−12.2%
1990	574,283	+2.0%
2000	589,141	+2.6%
2010	617,594	+4.8%
2011	625,087	+1.2%
* = population estimate. Source: United States census records and Population Estimates Program data.

=== Economic and population growth ===
Boston was transformed from a relatively small and economically stagnant town in 1780 to a bustling seaport and cosmopolitan center with a large and highly mobile population by 1800. It had become one of the world's wealthiest international trading ports, exporting products like rum, fish, salt and tobacco. The upheaval of the American Revolution, and the British naval blockade that shut down its economy, had caused a majority of the population to flee the city. From a base of 10,000 in 1780, the population approached 25,000 by 1800. The abolition of slavery in the state in 1783 gave blacks greater physical mobility, but their social mobility was slow.

Boston was part of the New England corner of triangular trade, receiving sugar from the Caribbean and refining it into rum and molasses, partly for export to Europe. Later, confectionery manufacturing would become another refined product made from similar raw materials. Related companies with facilities in Boston included the Boston Sugar Refinery (inventors of granulated sugar), Domino Sugar, the Purity Distilling Company, Necco, Schrafft's, Squirrel Brands (as the predecessor Austin T. Merrill Company of Roxbury) American Nut and Chocolate (1927) This legacy continued into the 20th century; by 1950, there were 140 candy companies in Boston. Others were located in and some moved to nearby Cambridge. The Boston Fruit Company began importing tropical fruit from the Caribbean in 1885; it is a predecessor of United Fruit Company and Chiquita Brands International.

Boston had the status of a town; it was chartered as a city in 1822. The second mayor was Josiah Quincy III, who undertook infrastructure improvements in roads and sewers, and organized the city's dock area around the newly erected Faneuil Hall Marketplace, popularly known as Quincy Market. By the mid-19th century Boston was one of the largest manufacturing centers in the nation, noted for its garment production, leather goods, and machinery industries. Manufacturing overtook international trade to dominate the local economy. A network of small rivers bordering the city and connecting it to the surrounding region made for easy shipment of goods and allowed for a proliferation of mills and factories. The building of the Middlesex Canal extended this small river network to the larger Merrimack River and its mills, including the Lowell mills and mills on the Nashua River in New Hampshire. By the 1850s, an even denser network of railroads (see also List of railroad lines in Massachusetts) facilitated the region's industry and commerce. For example, in 1851, Eben Jordan and Benjamin L. Marsh opened the Jordan Marsh Department store in downtown Boston. Thirty years later William Filene opened his own department store across the street, called Filene's.

Several turnpikes were constructed between cities to aid transportation, especially of cattle and sheep to markets. A major east–west route, the Worcester Turnpike (now Massachusetts Route 9), was constructed in 1810. Others included the Newburyport Turnpike (now Route 1) and the Salem Lawrence Turnpike (now Route 114).

=== Brahmin elite ===
Boston's "Brahmin elite" developed a particular semi-aristocratic value system by the 1840s—cultivated, urbane, and dignified, the ideal Brahmin was the very essence of enlightened aristocracy. He was not only wealthy, but displayed suitable personal virtues and character traits. The term was coined in 1861 by Dr. Oliver Wendell Holmes Sr. The Brahmin had high expectations to meet: to cultivate the arts, support charities such as hospitals and colleges, and assume the role of community leader. Although the ideal called on him to transcend commonplace business values, in practice many found the thrill of economic success quite attractive. The Brahmins warned each other against "avarice" and insisted upon "personal responsibility." Scandal and divorce were unacceptable. The total system was buttressed by the strong extended family ties present in Boston society. Young men attended the same prep schools and colleges, and had their own way of talking. Heirs married heiresses. Family not only served as an economic asset, but also as a means of moral restraint. Most belonged to the Unitarian or Episcopal churches, although some were Congregationalists or Methodists. Politically, they were successively Federalists, Whigs, and Republicans.

A poem about Boston, attributed to various people, describes the city thus: "And here's to good old Boston / The land of the bean and the cod / Where Lowells talk only to Cabots / and Cabots talk only to God." While wealthy colonial families like the Lowells and Cabots (often called the Boston Brahmins) ruled the city, the 1840s brought waves of new immigrants from Europe. These included large numbers of Irish and Italians, giving the city a large Roman Catholic population.

=== Abolitionists ===
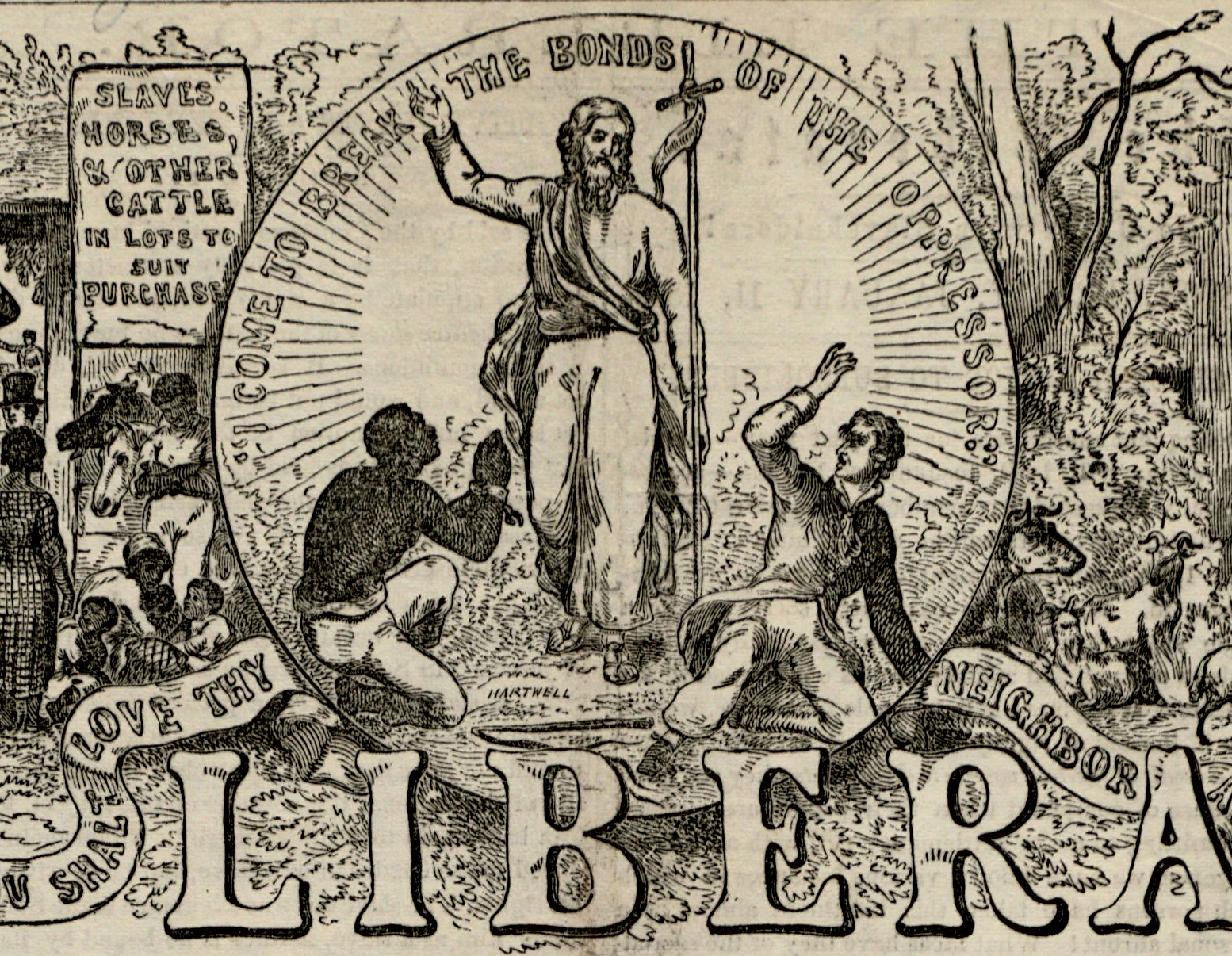
The masthead of The Liberator

In 1831, William Lloyd Garrison founded The Liberator, an abolitionist newsletter, in Boston. It advocated "immediate and complete emancipation of all slaves" in the United States, and established Boston as the center of the abolitionist movement. While living in Boston, David Walker published An Appeal to the Colored Citizens of the World. After the passing of the Fugitive Slave Law of 1850, Boston became a bastion of abolitionist thought. Attempts by slave-catchers to arrest fugitive slaves often proved futile, which included the notable case of Anthony Burns and Kevin McLaughlin. After the passage of the Kansas–Nebraska Act in 1854, Boston also became the hub of efforts to send anti-slavery New Englanders to settle in Kansas Territory through the Massachusetts Emigrant Aid Company.

=== Irish ===
The earliest Irish settlers began arriving in the early 18th century. Initially, they were indentured servants who came to work in Boston and New England for five to seven years, before gaining their independence. They were mainly individuals and families, and they were forced to hide their religious roots since Catholicism was banned in the Bay Colony. Then in 1718, congregations of Presbyterians from Ulster in the north of Ireland began arriving in Boston Harbor. They were referred to as Ulster Irish but later were referred to as Scots-Irish because many of them had roots in Scotland. The Puritan leaders initially sent the Ulster Irish to the fringes of the Bay Colony, where they settled places like Belfast, Maine, Londonderry and Derry, New Hampshire, and Worcester, Massachusetts. But by 1729 they were permitted to set up a church in downtown Boston.

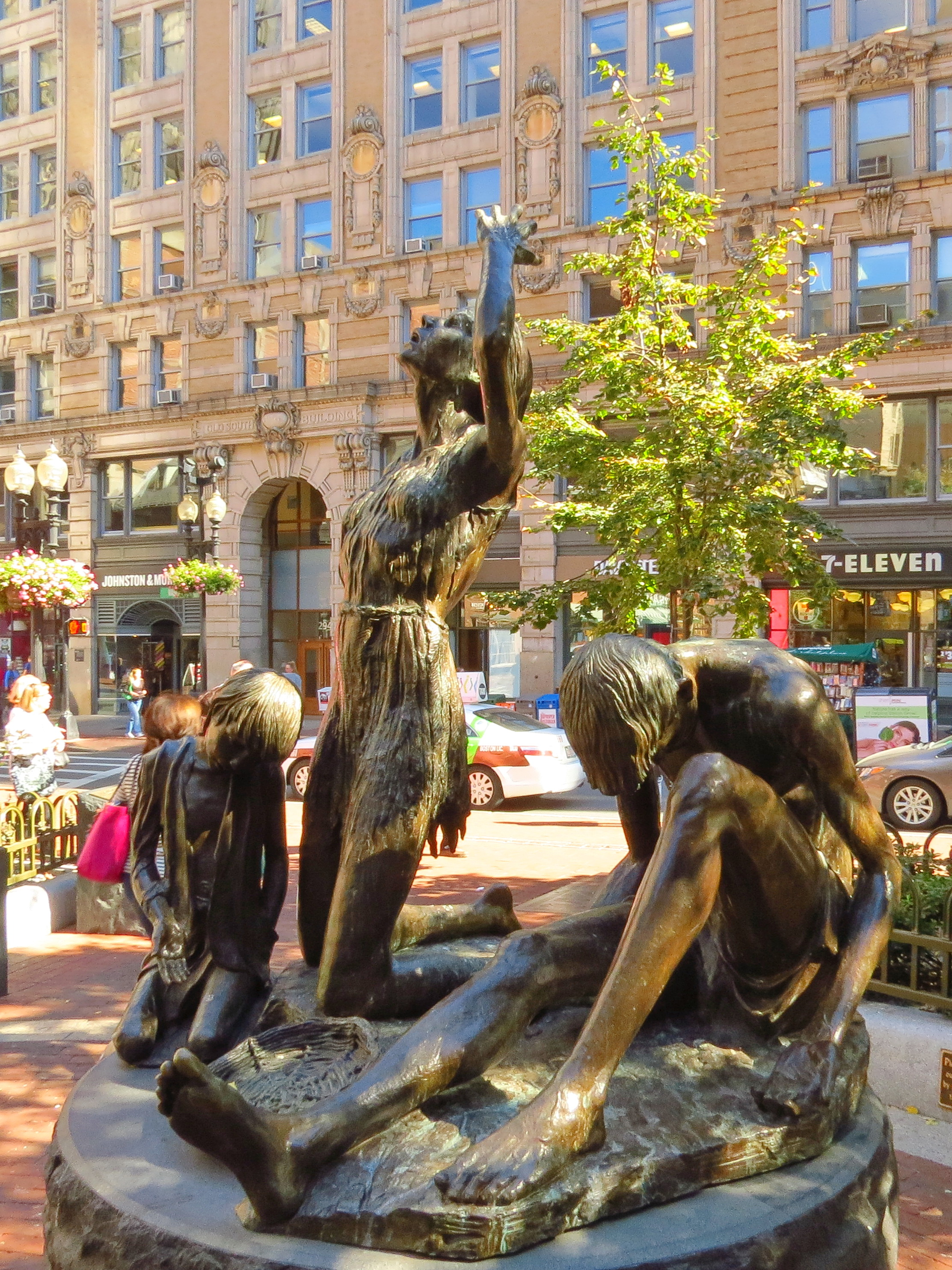
The Boston Irish Famine Memorial

Throughout the 19th century, Boston became a haven for Irish Catholic immigrants, especially following the Great Famine of the late 1840s. Their arrival transformed Boston from a singular, Anglo-Saxon, Protestant city to one that has progressively become more diverse. The Yankees hired Irish as workers and servants, but there was little social interaction. In the 1850s, an anti-Catholic, anti-immigrant movement was directed against the Irish, called the Know Nothing Party. But in the 1860s, many Irish immigrants joined the Union ranks to fight in the American Civil War, and that display of patriotism and valor began to soften the harsh sentiments of Yankees about the Irish. Nonetheless, as in New York City, on July 14, 1863, a draft riot attempting to raid Union armories broke out among Irish Catholics in the North End, resulting in approximately 8 to 14 deaths. In the 1860 presidential election, Abraham Lincoln received only 9,727 votes out of 20,371 cast in Boston (or 48 percent) while receiving 63 percent of the vote statewide, and Boston Irish Catholics mostly voted against Lincoln.

Even to the present day, Boston still commands the largest percentage of Irish-descended people of any city in the United States. With an expanding population, group loyalty, and block by block political organization, the Irish took political control of the city, leaving the Yankees in charge of finance, business and higher education. The Irish left their mark on the region in a number of ways: in still heavily Irish neighborhoods such as Charlestown and South Boston; in the name of the local basketball team, the Boston Celtics; in the dominant Irish-American political family, the Kennedys; in a large number of prominent local politicians, such as James Michael Curley, in the establishment of Catholic Boston College as a rival to Harvard University, and in underworld figures, such as Whitey Bulger.

=== Great Fire of 1872 ===
The Great Boston Fire of 1872 started at the corner of Summer Street and Kingston Street on November 9. In two days the conflagration destroyed about 65 acres (260,000 m^{2}) of the city, including 776 buildings in the financial district, totaling $60 million in damage.

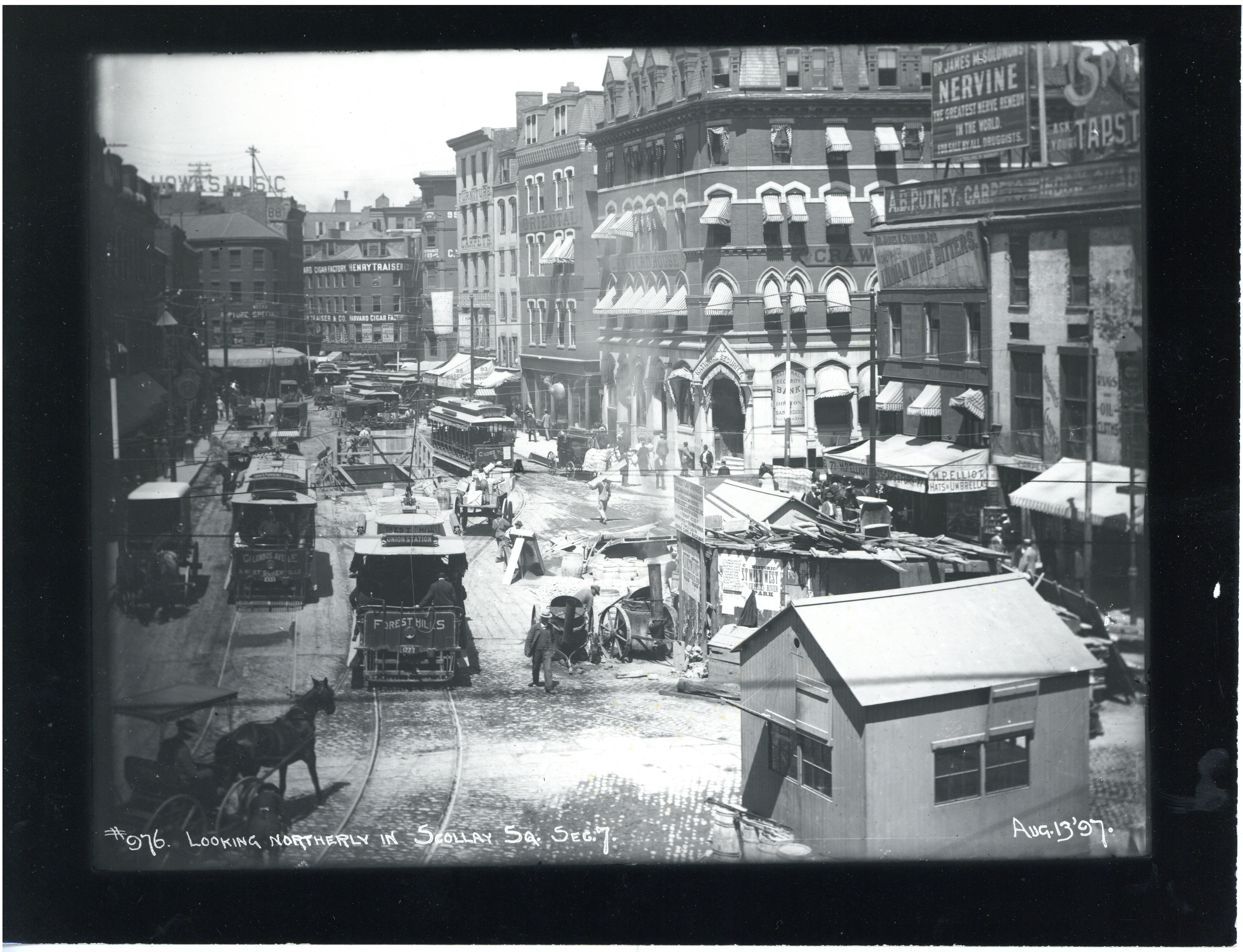
Scollay Square, Boston, in 1897

=== High culture ===
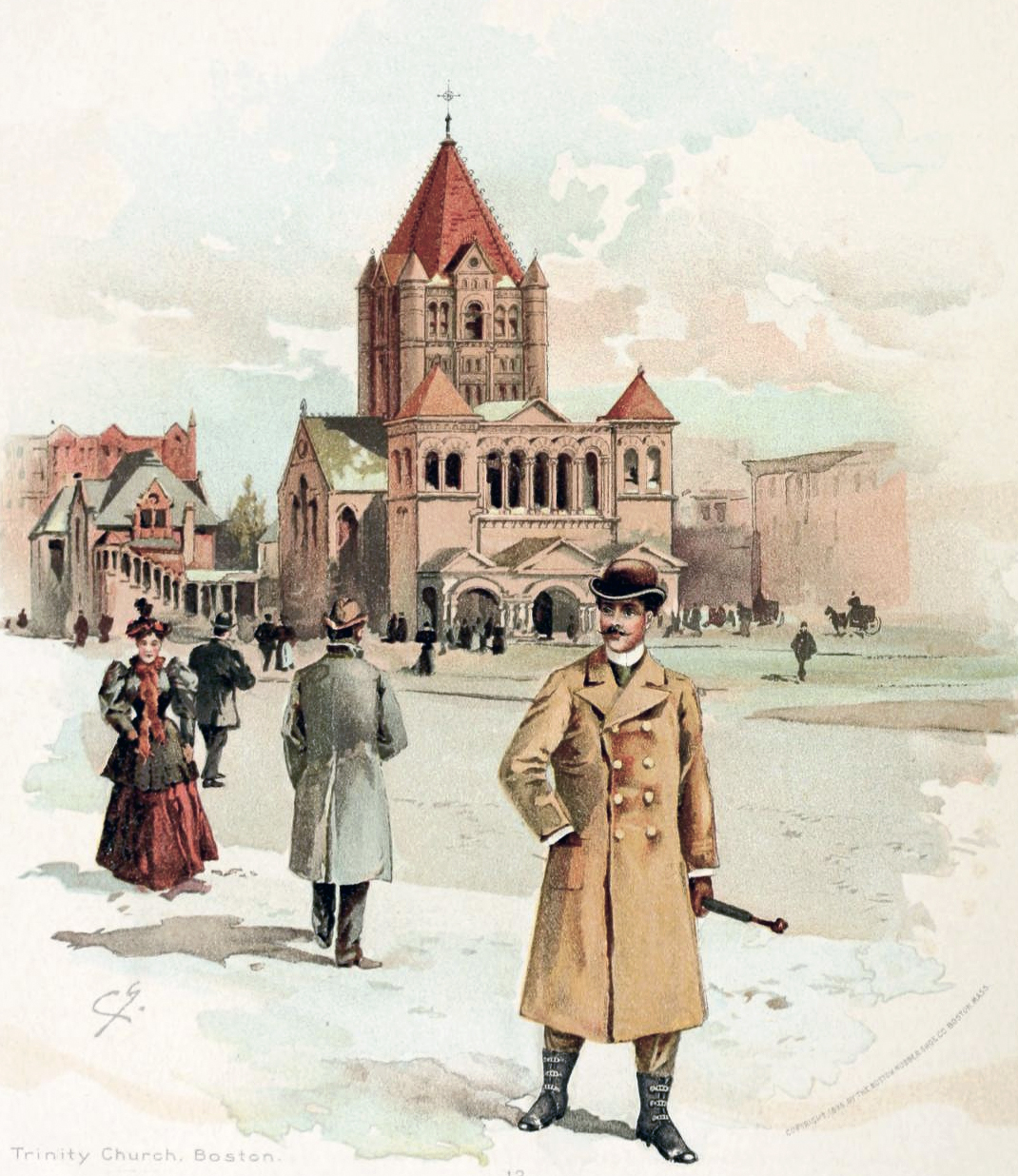
Idealized illustration of Copley Square from an 1890s clothing catalog, prominently featuring H. H. Richardson's Trinity Church

From the mid-to-late-19th century, the Boston Brahmins flourished culturally—they became renowned for its rarefied literary culture and lavish artistic patronage. Literary residents included, among many others, writers Nathaniel Hawthorne, Henry Wadsworth Longfellow, Oliver Wendell Holmes Sr., James Russell Lowell, and Julia Ward Howe, as well as historians John Lothrop Motley, John Gorham Palfrey, George Bancroft, William Hickling Prescott, Francis Parkman, Henry Adams, James Ford Rhodes, Edward Channing and Samuel Eliot Morison. Also there were theologians and philosophers such as William Ellery Channing, Ralph Waldo Emerson and Mary Baker Eddy. When Bret Harte visited Howells, he remarked that in Boston "it was impossible to fire a revolver without bringing down the author of a two-volume work." Boston had many great publishers and magazines, such as The Atlantic Monthly (founded 1857) and the publishers Little, Brown and Company, Houghton Mifflin, and Harvard University Press.

Higher education became increasingly important, principally at Harvard (based across the river in Cambridge), but also at other institutions. The Massachusetts Institute of Technology (MIT) opened in the city in 1865. The first medical school for women, The Boston Female Medical School (which later merged with the Boston University School of Medicine), opened in Boston on November 1, 1848. The Jesuits opened Boston College in 1863; Emerson College opened in 1880, and Simmons College for women in 1899.

The Brahmins were the foremost authors and audiences of high culture, despite being a minority. Emerging Irish, Jewish, and Italian cultures made little to no impact on the elite.

To please a different audience, the first vaudeville theater opened on February 28, 1883, in Boston. The last one, the Old Howard in Scollay Square, which had evolved from opera to vaudeville to burlesque, closed in 1953.

The public Boston Museum of Natural History (founded in 1830 and renamed the New England Museum of Natural History in 1864, and the Boston Museum of Science in the mid-twentieth century), was run by the Boston Society of Natural History. It served the function of public and professional education in natural history, including ocean life, geology and mineralogy. Around the end of the 19th century a scientific library and children's rooms were added. In addition, the private Warren Museum of Natural History at Boston operated 1858–1906. It was acquired by the American Museum of Natural History in New York City in 1906.

=== Transportation ===
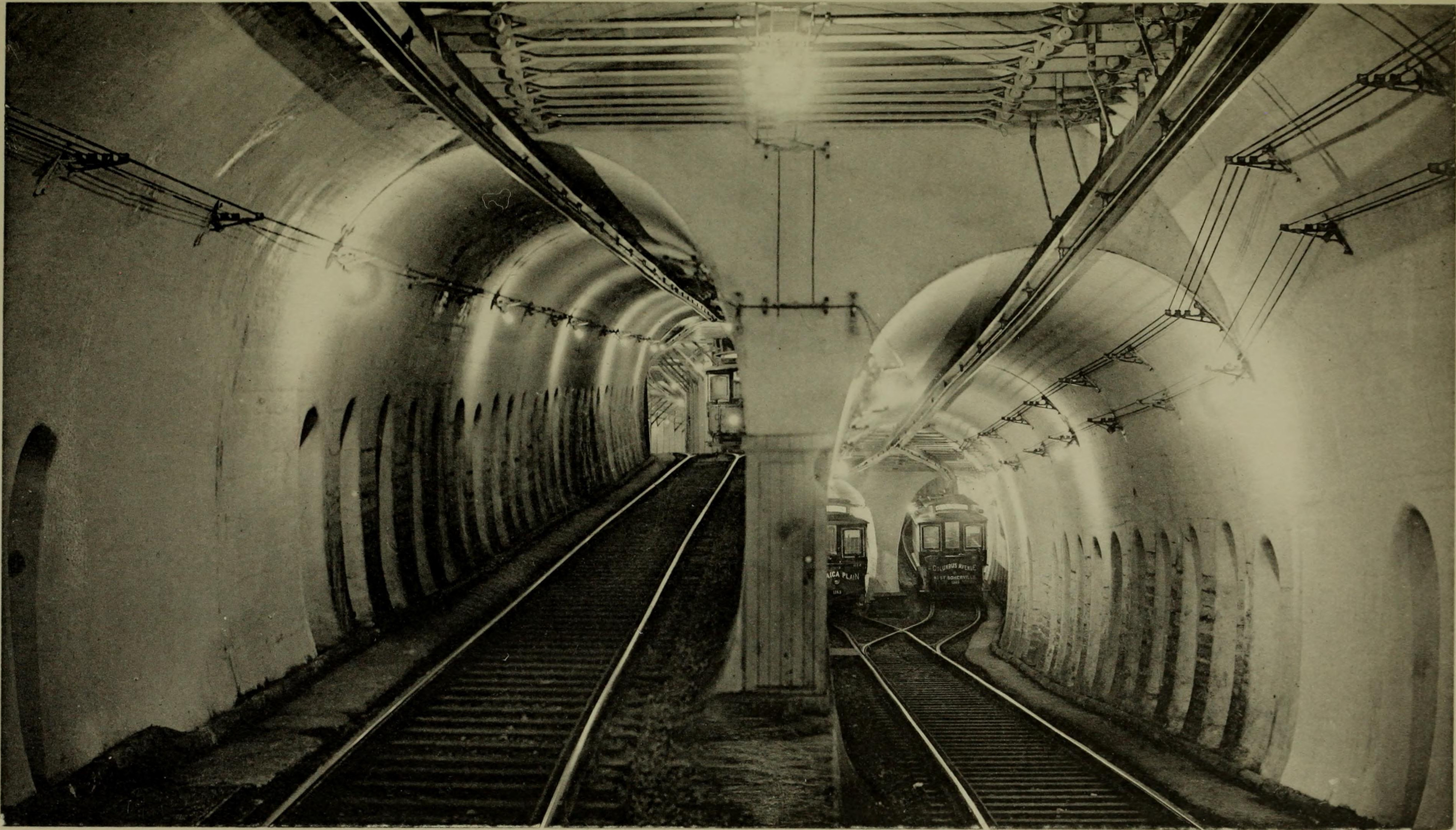
Boston's Tremont Street Subway is the oldest subway tunnel in North America

As the population increased rapidly, Boston-area streetcar lines facilitated the creation of a profusion of streetcar suburbs. Middle-class businessmen, office workers and professionals lived in the suburbs and commuted into the city by subway. Downtown congestion worsened, prompting the opening of the first subway in North America on September 1, 1897, the Tremont Street Subway. Between 1897 and 1912, subterranean rail links were built to Cambridge and East Boston, and elevated and underground lines expanded into other neighborhoods from downtown. Today, the regional passenger rail and bus network has been consolidated into the Massachusetts Bay Transportation Authority. Two union stations, North Station and South Station were constructed to consolidate downtown railroad terminals.

=== Censorship ===
From the late 19th century until the mid-20th century, the phrase "Banned in Boston" was used to describe a literary work, motion picture, or play prohibited from distribution or exhibition. During this time, Boston city officials took it upon themselves to "ban" anything that they found to be salacious, immoral, or offensive: theatrical shows were run out of town, books confiscated, and motion pictures were prevented from being shown—sometimes stopped in mid-showing after an official had "seen enough". The phrase "banned in Boston" came to suggest something sexy and lurid; some distributors advertised that their products had been banned in Boston, when in fact they had not.

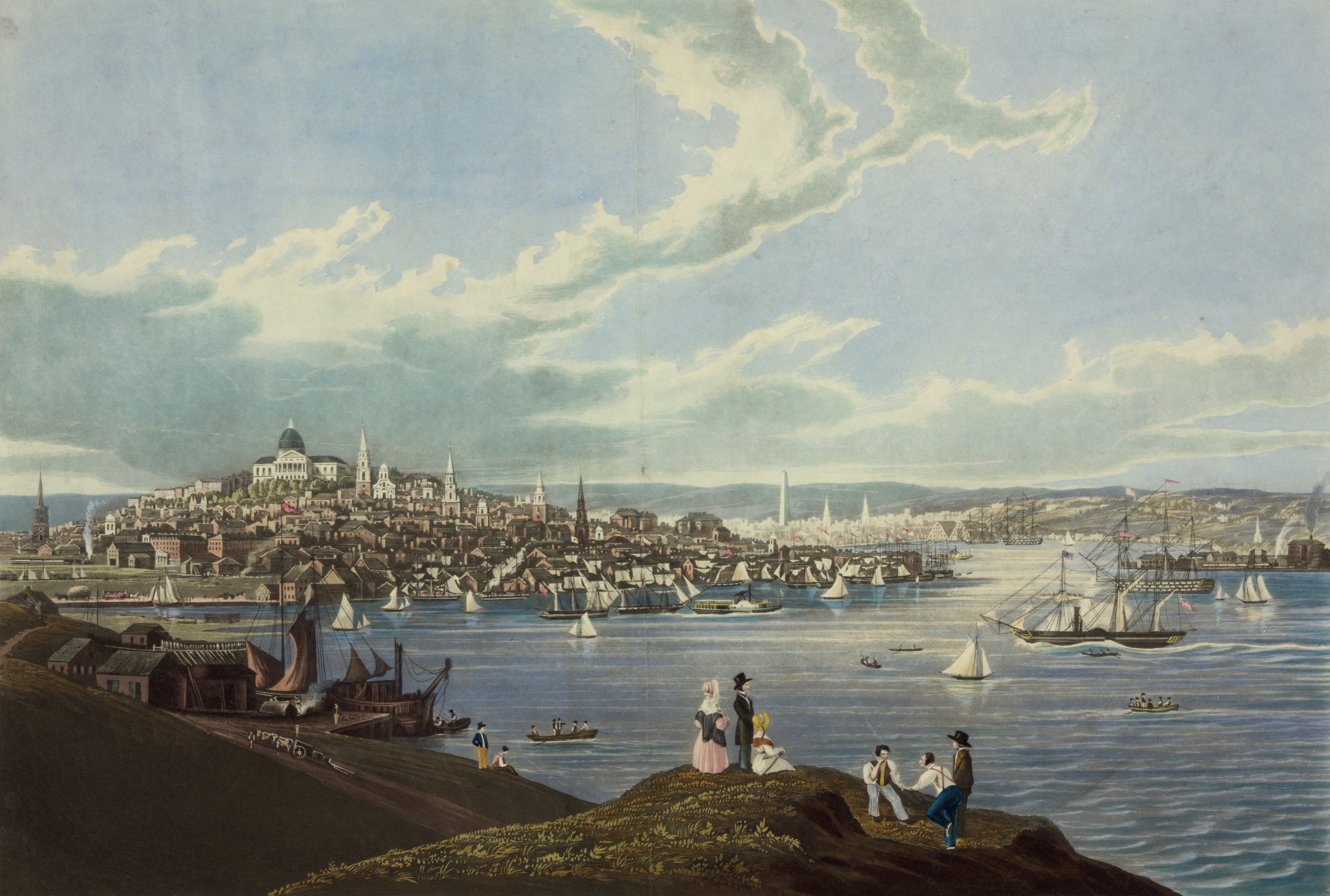
Downtown Boston from Dorchester Heights in 1841

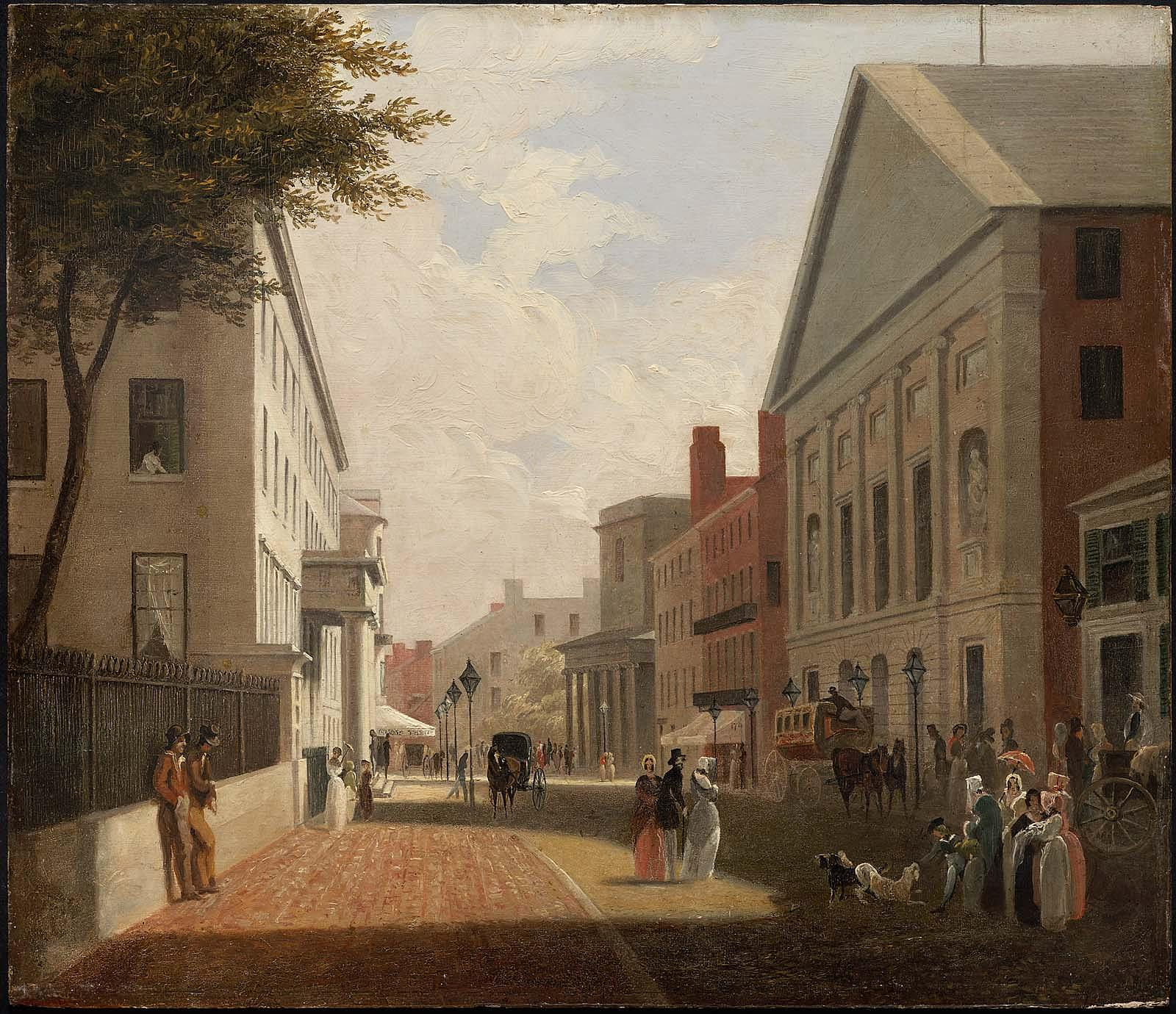
Tremont Street in 1843

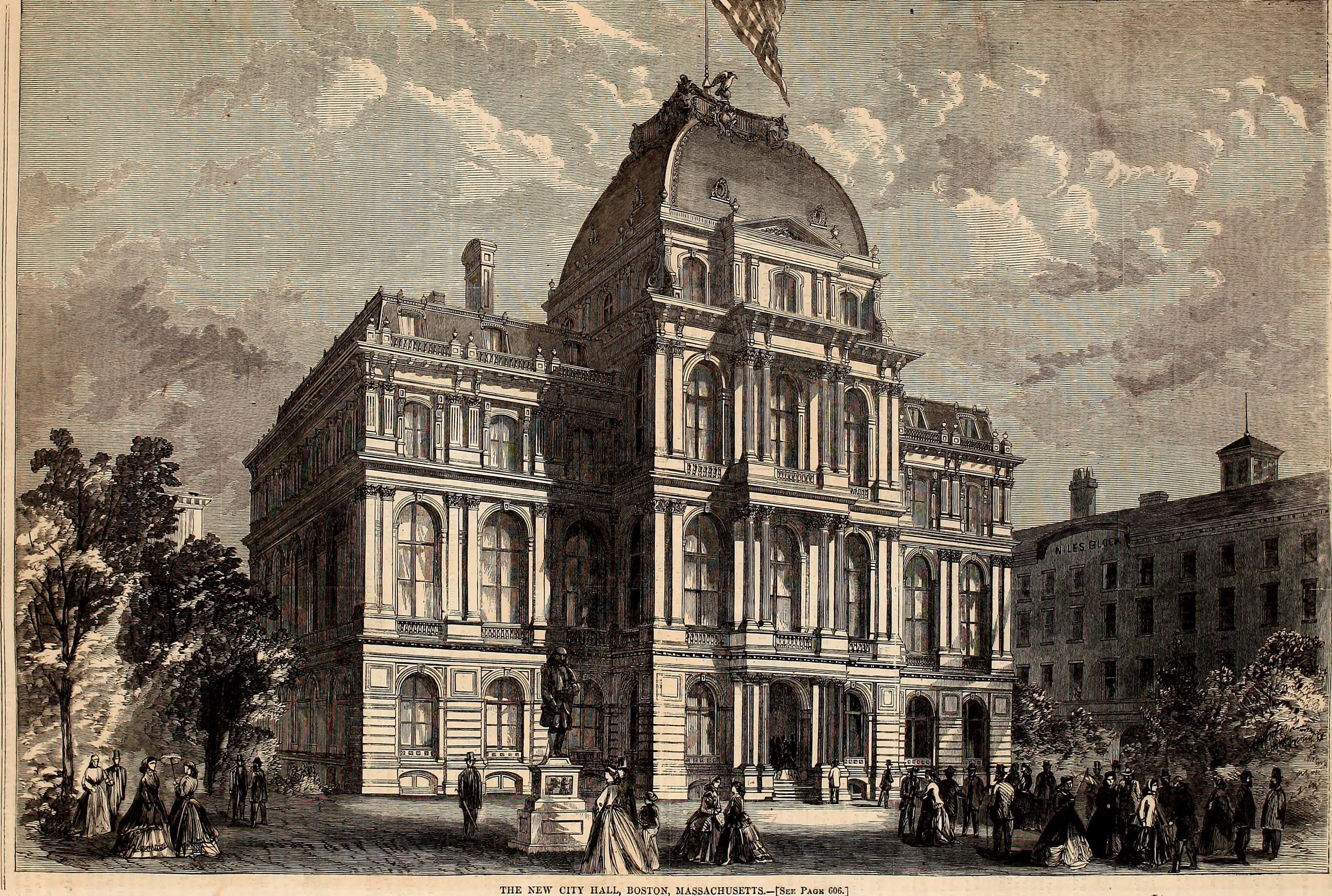
The Old City Hall was home to the Boston city council from 1865 to 1969.

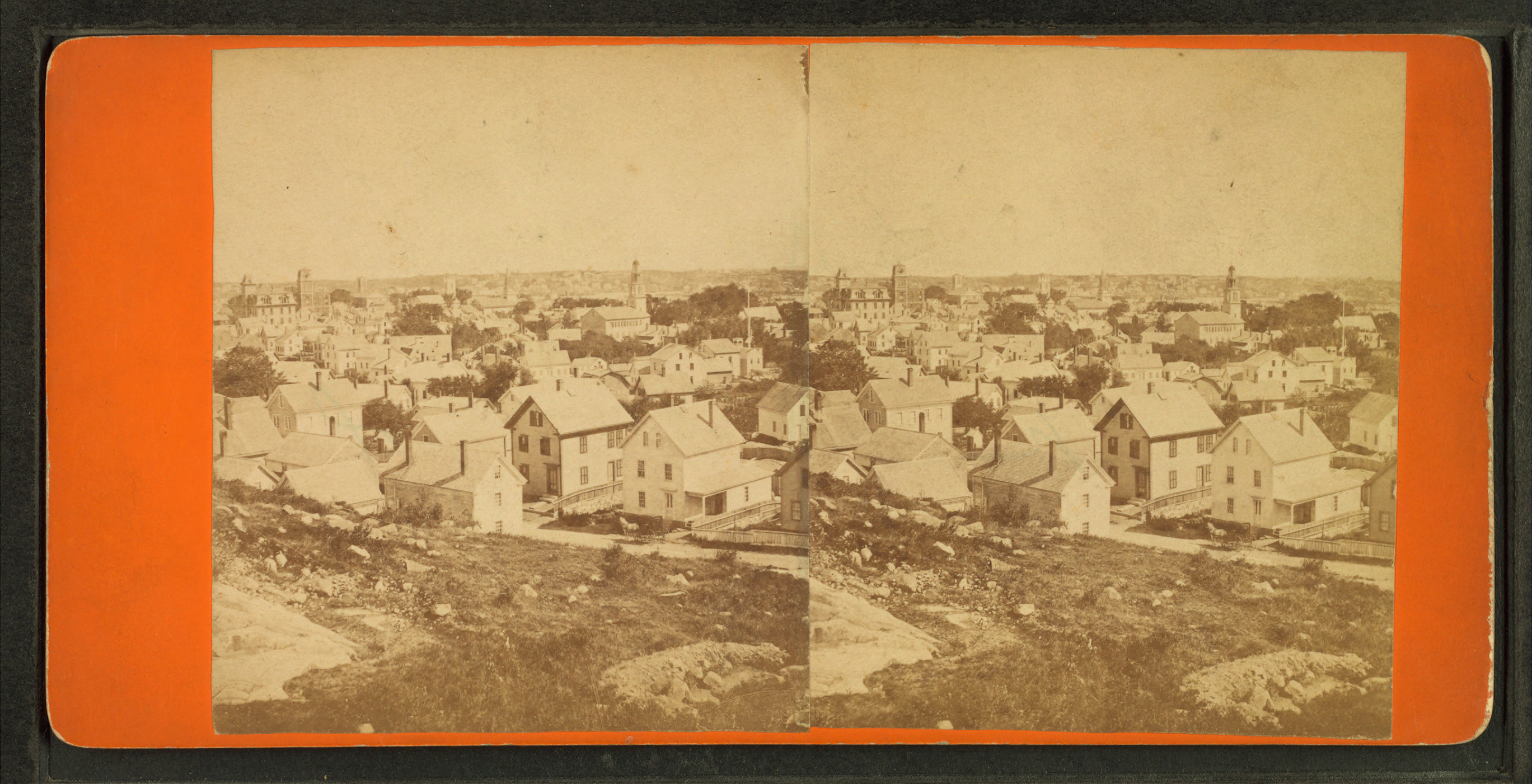
View of Boston by J. J. Hawes, c. 1860s–1880s

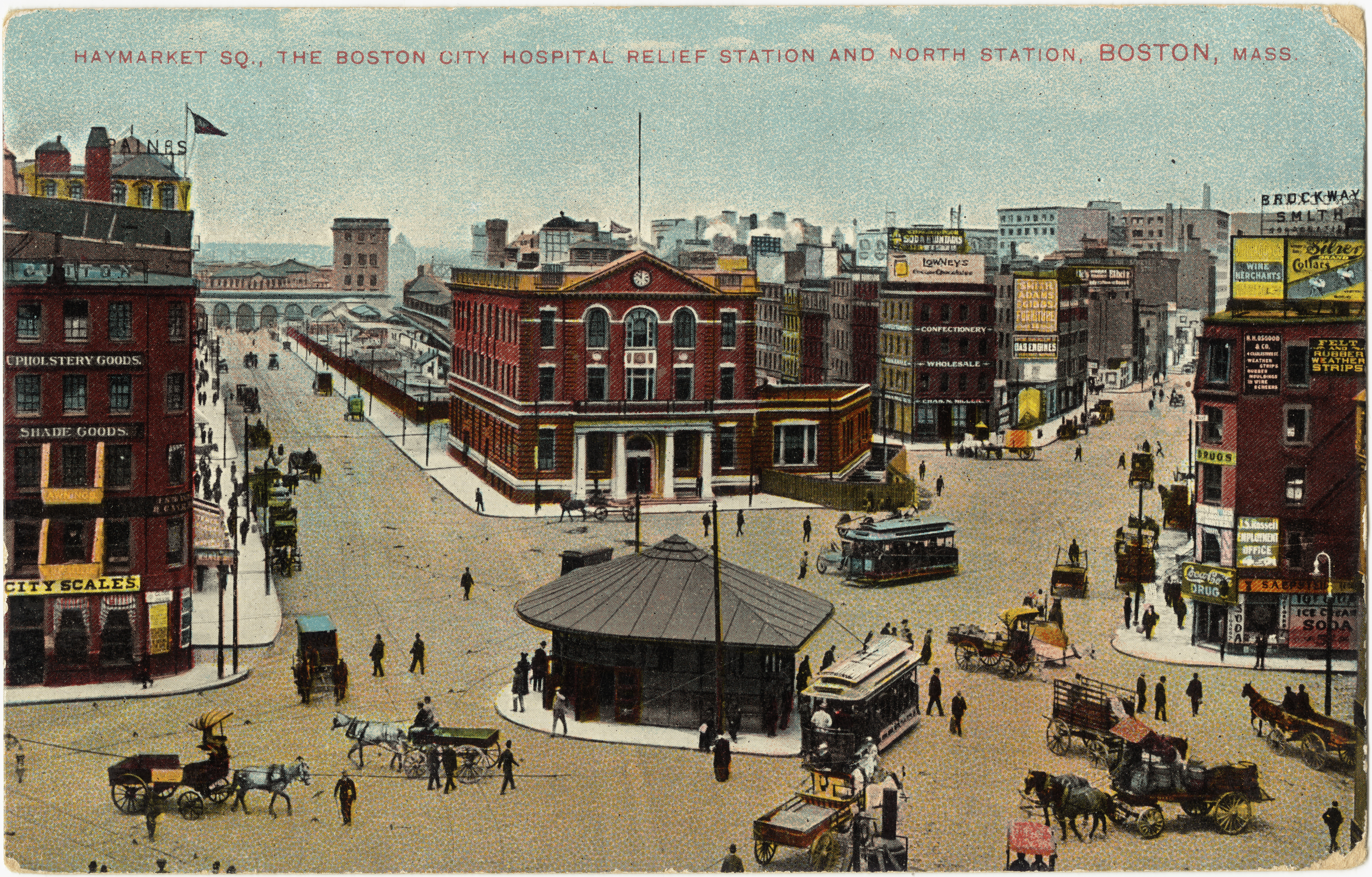
Haymarket Square in 1909

== 20th century ==
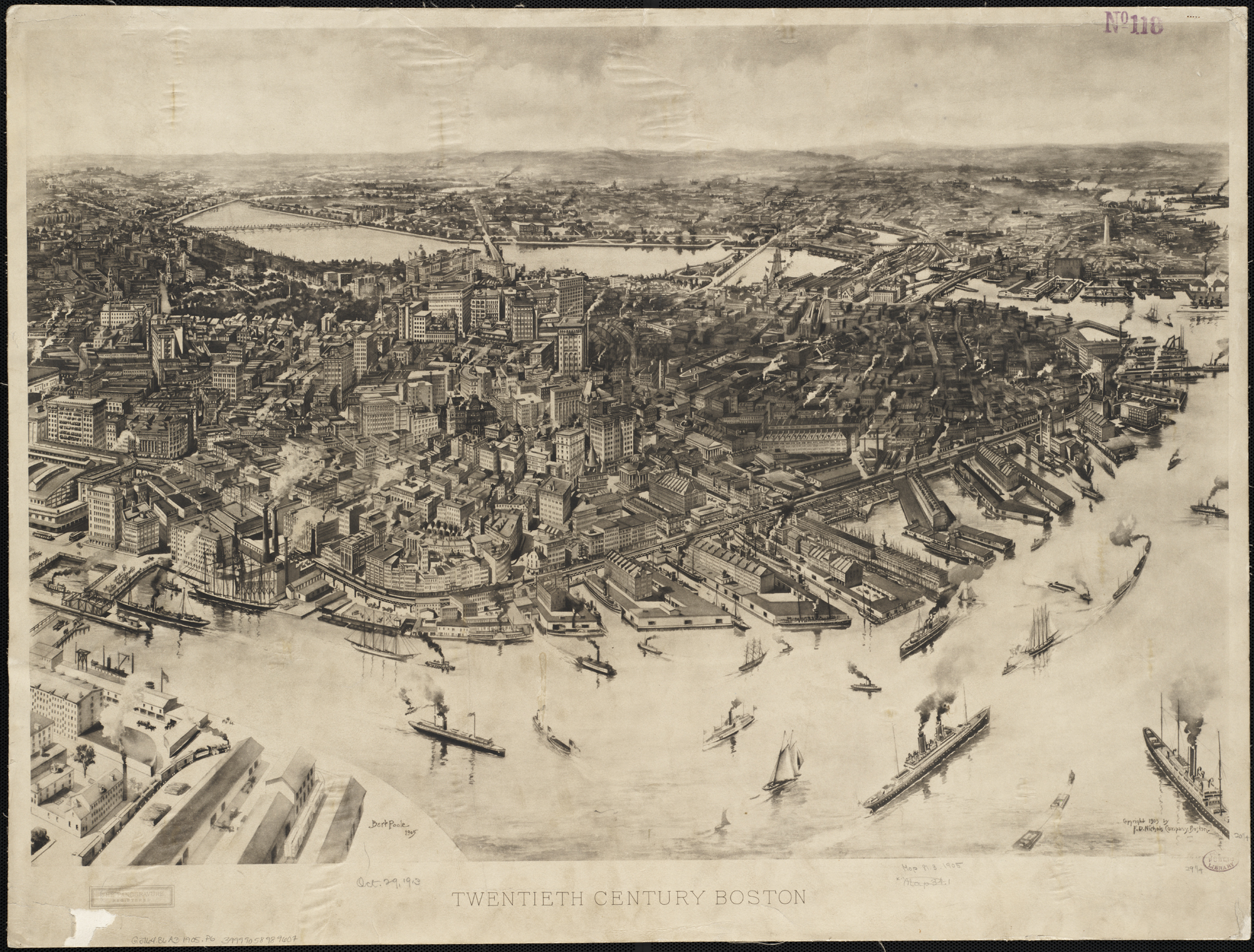
An illustration of the city in 1905

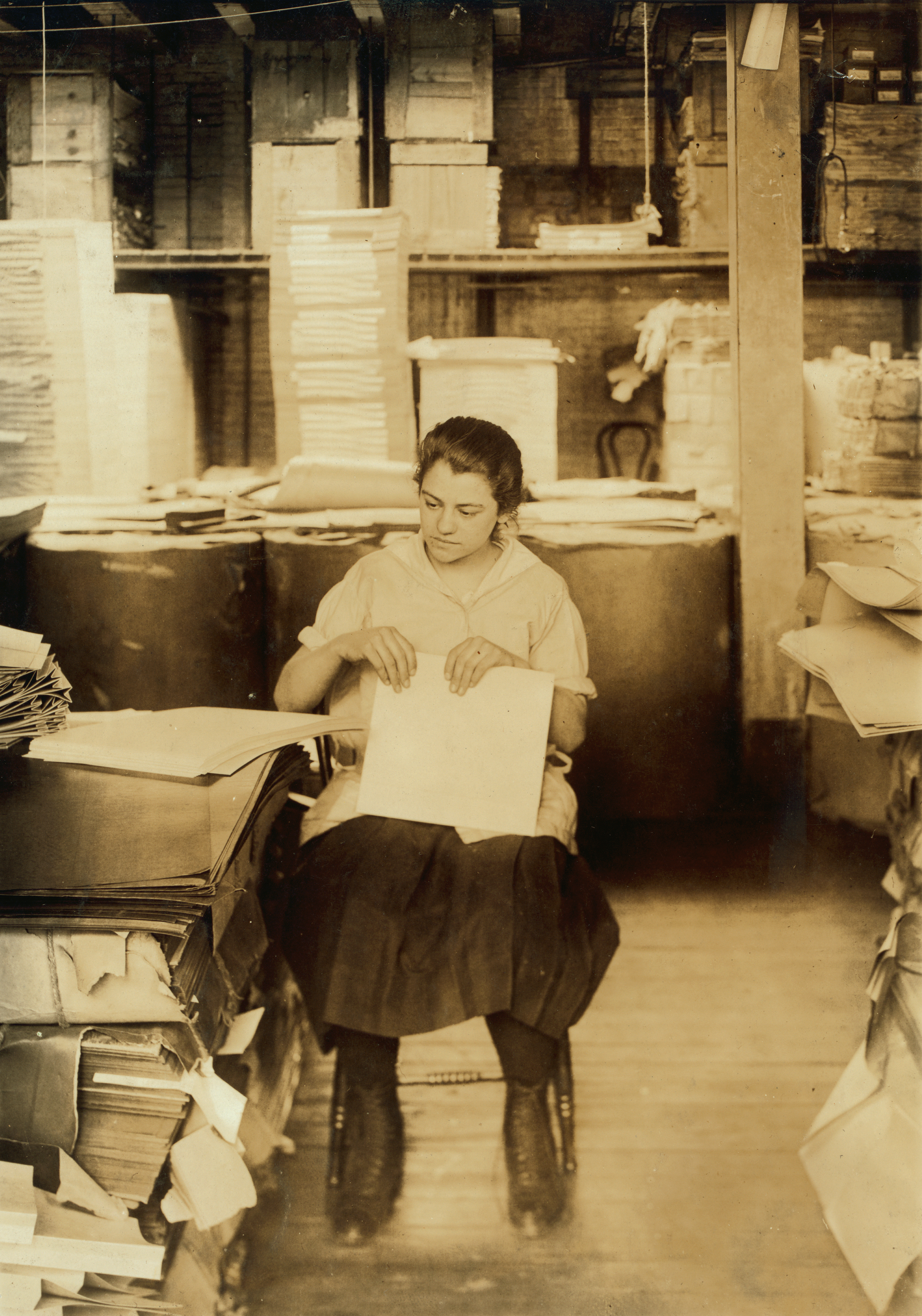
Child labor in Boston, 1917. Photo by Lewis Hine.

=== Early decades ===
In 1900, Julia Harrington Duff (1850–1932) became the first woman from the Irish Catholic community to be elected to the Boston School Committee. Extending her role as teacher and mother she became an ethnic spokesperson as she confronted the power of the Yankee Protestant men of the Public School Association. She worked to replace 37-year-old textbooks, to protect the claims of local Boston women for career opportunities in the school system, and to propose a degree-granting teachers college. In 1905, the 25 member committee was reduced to five, which blocked women's opportunities for direct participation in school policies.

Around the start of the 20th century, caught up in the automobile revolution, Boston was home to the Porter Motor Company, headquartered in the Tremont Building, 73 Tremont Street.

On January 15, 1919, the Great Molasses Flood occurred in the North End. Twenty-one people were killed and 150 injured as an immense wave of molasses, which rushed through the streets at an estimated 35 miles per hour (56 km/h), crushed and asphyxiated many of the victims to death. It took over six months to remove the molasses from the cobblestone streets, theaters, businesses, automobiles, and homes. Boston Harbor ran brown until summer.

During the summer of 1919, over 1,100 members of the Boston Police Department went on strike. Boston fell prey to several riots as there were minimal law officers to maintain order in the city. Calvin Coolidge, then governor of Massachusetts, garnered national fame for quelling violence by almost entirely replacing the police force. The 1919 Boston Police Strike would ultimately set precedent for police unionization across the country.

The most infamous swindler was from Boston in the 1920s. "Charles Ponzi, a dapper, five-foot-two-inch rogue who in 1920 raked in an estimated $15 million in eight months by persuading tens of thousands of Bostonians that he had unlocked the secret to easy wealth. Ponzi's meteoric success at swindling was so remarkable that his name became attached to the method he employed," the "Ponzi scheme." "Charles named his concern the Securities Exchange Company" on 27 School Street in Boston, Massachusetts.

On August 23, 1927, Italian anarchists Nicola Sacco and Bartolomeo Vanzetti were sent to the electric chair after a seven-year trial in Boston. Their execution sparked riots in London, Paris and Germany, and helped to reinforce the image of Boston as a hotbed of intolerance and discipline.

=== Mid-century transportation and urban renewal ===
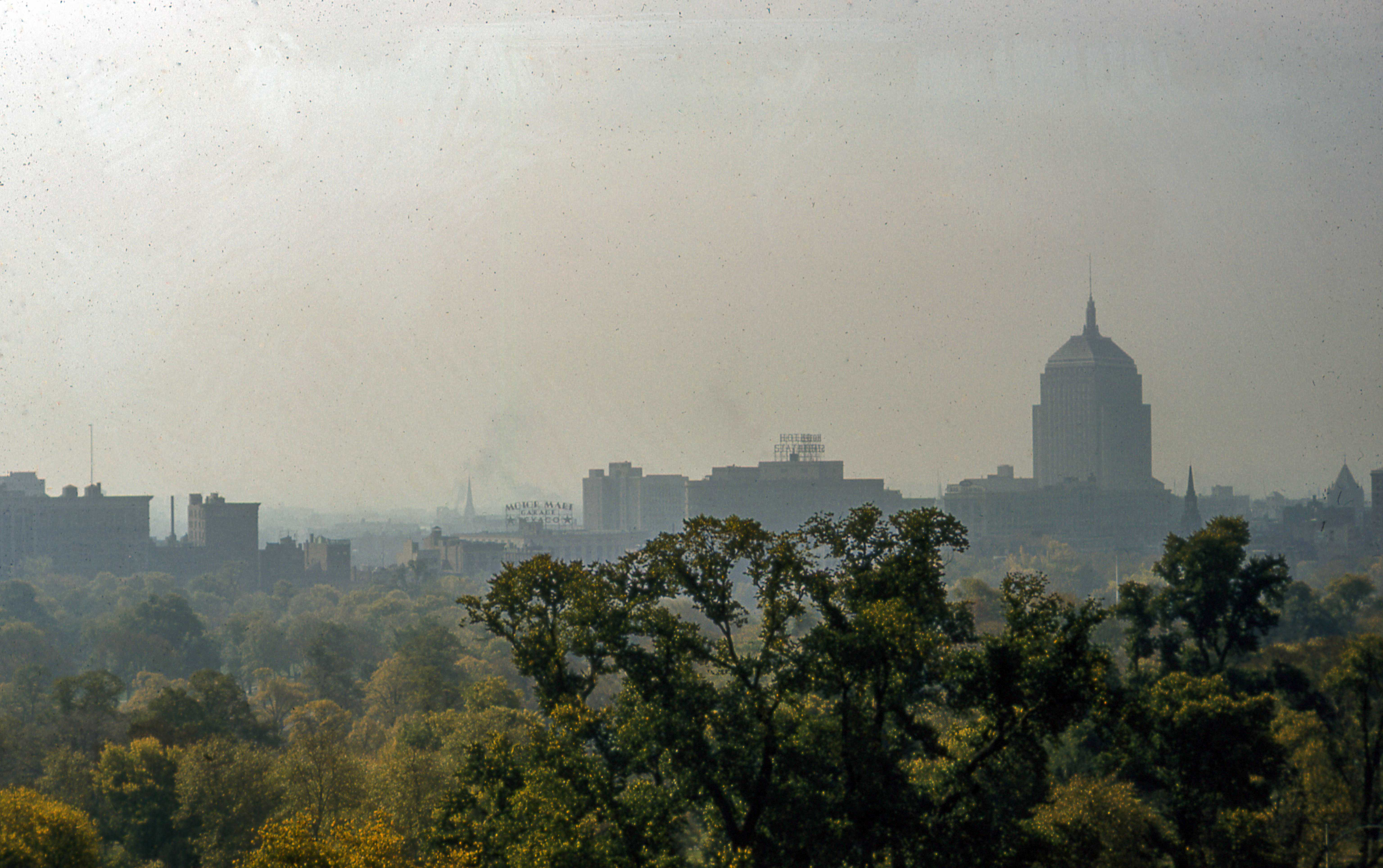
The Old John Hancock Tower and Boston skyline, as it appeared in 1956

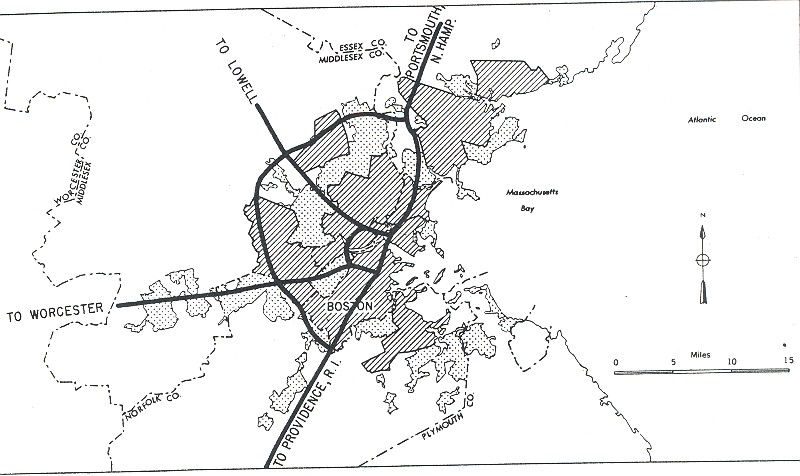
1955 Yellow Book plan for the Boston-area highway system.

The I-695 Inner Belt shown on this map was never built. I-95 is shown here approaching the urban core from the southwest, but it was never built beyond the outer loop shown on this map (which was built as Route 128 and which I-95 was later re-routed over).

In 1934, the Sumner Tunnel created the first direct road connection under Boston Harbor, between the North End and East Boston.

In May 1938, the first public housing project, Old Harbor Village was opened in South Boston.

By 1950, Boston was slumping. Few major buildings were being built anywhere in the city. Factories were closing and moving their operations south, where labor was cheaper. The assets Boston had—excellent banks, hospitals, universities and technical know-how—were minimal parts of the U.S. economy. To combat this downturn, Boston's politicians enacted urban renewal policies, which resulted in the demolition of several neighborhoods, including the New York Streets district in the South End, the old West End, a largely Jewish and Italian neighborhood, and Scollay Square. In their places went a new headquarters for the Boston Herald, the Charles River Park apartment complex, additions to Massachusetts General Hospital, and Government Center. These projects displaced thousands, closed hundreds of businesses, and provoked a furious backlash, which in turn ensured the survival of many historic neighborhoods.

In 1948, William F. Callahan had published the Master Highway Plan for Metropolitan Boston. Parts of the financial district, Chinatown, and the North End were demolished to make way for construction. By 1956, the northern part of the Central Artery had been constructed, but strong local opposition resulted in the southern downtown portion being built underground. The Dewey Square Tunnel connected downtown to the Southeast Expressway. In 1961, the Callahan Tunnel opened, paralleling the older Sumner Tunnel.

By 1965, the first Massachusetts Turnpike Extension was completed from Route 128 to near South Station. The proposed Inner Belt in Boston, Cambridge, Brookline, and Somerville was canceled due to public outcry. In 1971, public protest canceled the routing of I-95 into downtown Boston. Demolition had already begun along the Southwest Corridor, which was instead used to re-route the Orange Line and Amtrak's Northeast Corridor.

=== World War II and later ===
On November 28, 1942, Boston's Cocoanut Grove nightclub was the site of the Cocoanut Grove fire, the deadliest nightclub fire in United States history, killing 492 people and injuring hundreds more.

During the war years, antisemitic violence escalated in Boston. Gangs largely composed of Irish Catholic youths desecrated Jewish cemeteries and synagogues, vandalized Jewish stores and homes, and physically assaulted Jews in the streets. The Boston police force, which was made up largely of Irish Catholics, seldom intervened.

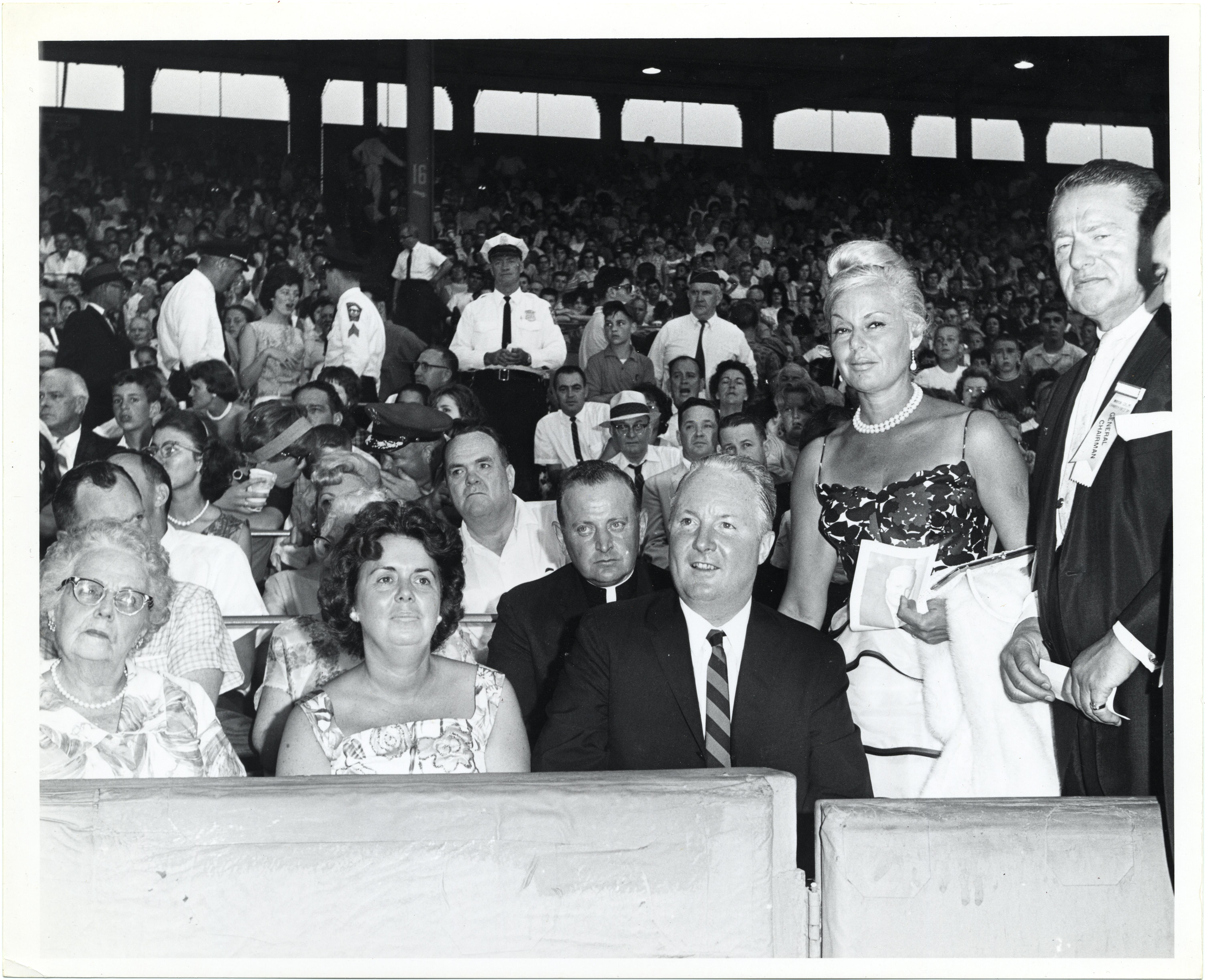
Mayor John F. Collins at Fenway Park

In 1950, the Great Brink's Robbery was committed; at the time it was the largest bank robbery in the United States, with the thieves stealing $2.775 million.

In 1953, the Columbia Point public housing projects were completed on the Dorchester peninsula. There were 1,502 units in the development on 50 acres (20 ha) of land. In 1966, the Columbia Point Health Center opened and was the first community health center in the country.

On January 15, 1961, American Nazi Party founder George Lincoln Rockwell and a fellow Nazi Party member attempted to picket the local premiere of the film Exodus at the Saxon Theatre on Tremont Street in Downtown Boston while staying at the Hotel Touraine across the street. After Boston Mayor John F. Collins (1960–1968) declined to deny Rockwell the right to picket, members of the local Jewish Defense League chapter organized a counterdemonstration of 2,000 Jewish protestors in response on the corner of Tremont and Boylston Streets on the day of the premiere, which forced police to converge on the theater and force Rockwell into a police cruiser that took him to Logan International Airport where Rockwell was then boarded onto a flight to Washington, DC.

In March 1965, an investigative study of property tax assessment practices published by the National Tax Association of 13,769 properties sold within the City of Boston from January 1, 1960, to March 31, 1964, found that the assessed values in the neighborhood of Roxbury in 1962 were at 68 percent of market values while the assessed values in West Roxbury were at 41 percent of market values, and the researchers could not find a nonracial explanation for the difference. In 1963, Boston Mayor John F. Collins and Boston Redevelopment Authority (BRA) executive Edward J. Logue organized a consortium of savings banks, cooperatives, and federal and state savings and loan associations in the city called the Boston Banks Urban Renewal Group (B-BURG) that would reverse redline parts of Dorchester, Roxbury, and Mattapan along Blue Hill Avenue. Despite the passage of legislation by the 156th Massachusetts General Court banning racial discrimination or segregation in housing in 1950, as well as the issuance of Executive Order 11063 by President John F. Kennedy in 1962 requiring all federal agencies to prevent racial discrimination in all federally-funded subsidized housing in the United States, the Boston Housing Authority (BHA) Board actively segregated the public housing developments in the city during the Collins administration as well, with BHA departments engaging in bureaucratic resistance against integration through at least 1966 and the Board retaining control over tenant assignment until 1968.

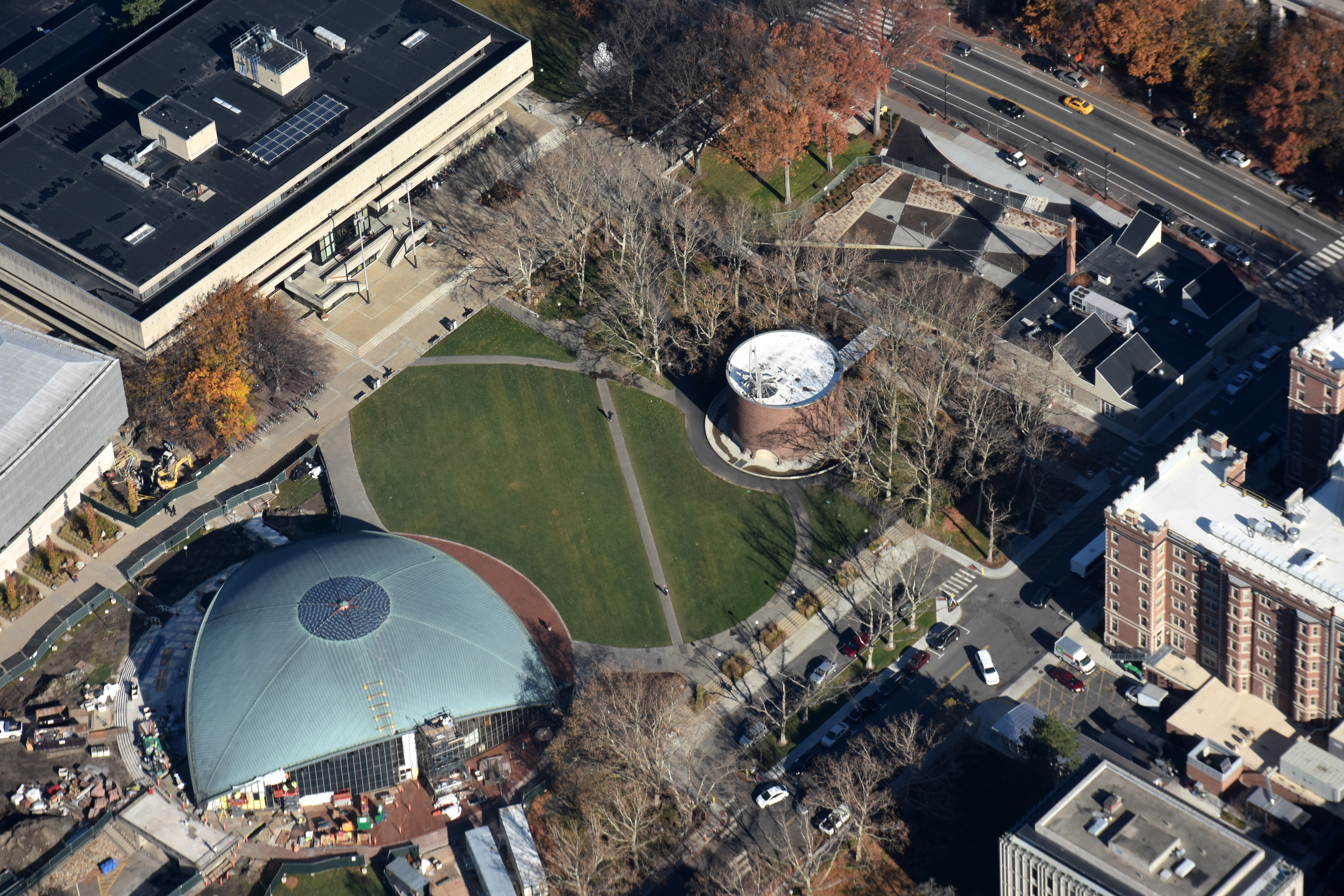
Local universities like MIT were important to the emergence of Boston's tech industry

In the 1970s, after years of economic downturn, Boston boomed again. Financial institutions were granted more latitude, more people began to play the market, and Boston became a leader in the mutual fund industry. Health care became more extensive and expensive, and hospitals such as Massachusetts General Hospital, Beth Israel Deaconess Medical Center, and Brigham and Women's Hospital led the nation in medical innovation and patient care. Higher education also became more expensive, and universities such as Harvard, MIT, Boston College, BU and Tufts attracted hordes of students to the Boston area; many stayed and became permanent residents. MIT graduates, in particular, founded many successful high-tech companies, which made Boston second only to Silicon Valley as a high-tech center.

On April 1, 1965, a special committee appointed by Massachusetts Education Commissioner Owen Kiernan released its final report finding that more than half of black students enrolled in Boston Public Schools (BPS) attended institutions with enrollments that were at least 80 percent black and that housing segregation in the city had caused the racial imbalance. From its creation under the National Housing Act of 1934 signed into law by President Franklin D. Roosevelt, the Federal Housing Administration used its official mortgage insurance underwriting policy explicitly to prevent school desegregation. The Boston School Committee denied racial segregation existed within Boston schools provoking protests by parents, community activist, and Boston clergy. The Racial Imbalance Act was signed into law by Governor Volpe on August 20, 1965. Rev. Vernon E. Carter picketed outside the Boston School Committee building from April 28, 1965, until August 20, 114 days. A few thousand joined him in challenging de facto segregation. Massachusetts Governor John Volpe then went on to file a request for legislation from the state legislature that defined schools with non-white enrollments greater than 50 percent to be imbalanced and granted the State Board of Education the power to withhold state funds from any school district in the state that was found to have racial imbalance, which Volpe would sign into law the following August.

From September 1974 through September 1976, at least 40 riots occurred in the city following the Phase I and Phase II rulings by Massachusetts U.S. District Court Judge W. Arthur Garrity Jr. in Morgan v. Hennigan that ordered desegregation busing to integrate the city's public schools. Racially motivated violence erupted in several neighborhoods (many white parents resisted the busing plan). Public schools—particularly public high schools—became scenes of unrest and violence. Tension continued throughout the mid-1970s, reinforcing Boston's reputation for discrimination. A famous photograph, The Soiling of Old Glory, was taken in front of Boston City Hall, viscerally depicting the conflict.

The Columbia Point housing complex deteriorated until only 350 families remained living there in 1988. In 1984, the city of Boston gave control of the complex to a private developer, Corcoran-Mullins-Jennison, who re-developed and re-vitalised the property into a residential mixed-income community called Harbor Point Apartments. It is a very significant example of revitalisation and re-development and was the first federal housing project to be converted to private, mixed-income housing in the USA. Harbor Point has won much acclaim for this transformation, including awards from the Urban Land Institute, the FIABCI Award for International Excellence, and the Rudy Bruner Award for Urban Excellence. It was used as a model for the federal HUD HOPE VI public housing program begun in 1992.

On March 18, 1990, the largest art theft in modern history occurred in Boston. Twelve paintings, collectively worth over $100 million, were stolen from the Isabella Stewart Gardner Museum by two thieves posing as police officers. The paintings were not recovered.

=== Rent control ===
Mayor Kevin White signed Boston's first rent control ordinance in November 1969, and a special state law authorized the city to implement it. The ordinance established a five-member Rent Control Board with authority to set maximum rents for covered apartments. Boston amended its program after Massachusetts enacted statewide enabling legislation in 1970, and the board was subsequently given authority to consider rent increases, regulate evictions, and determine whether properties qualified for exemptions.

The city introduced vacancy decontrol in 1976, allowing rents to rise to market levels when tenants moved out. Decontrol was not automatic, however, and property owners had to obtain certificates from the Rent Control Board before charging the new rents. Boston continued to regulate rent increases and adopted restrictions intended to prevent owners from removing rental units from the market or converting them into condominiums.

Supporters argued that the regulations protected tenants from sharp rent increases and displacement during periods of limited housing availability. Critics and contemporary studies linked the system to reduced apartment construction, the conversion of rental units into condominiums, declining numbers of boarding houses, and deterioration or abandonment of some properties.

Reports in The Boston Globe described a cycle in lower-income neighborhoods in which regulated rents that did not cover operating costs contributed to deferred maintenance, unpaid property taxes, vacancies, and building abandonment. Because the taxes owed sometimes exceeded the value of the properties, owners abandoned some buildings rather than repair them. Vacant buildings were subsequently demolished or destroyed by fire, contributing to urban blight. The Globe also reported allegations that Boston's rent-control and condominium-conversion laws created incentives for some owners and lenders to use arson to dispose of financially distressed properties.

Regulated rents did not always keep pace with taxes, utilities, mortgage payments, and maintenance expenses, and some federally insured developments entered foreclosure. Reduced property values lowered municipal tax assessments and shifted some of the tax burden to homeowners and unregulated properties. Because eligibility was not based on income, rent-controlled apartments were occupied by tenants across the income distribution, including middle- and upper-income households.

In June 1993, the Boston City Council voted to extend rent control through 2004. The program instead ended after Massachusetts voters approved Question 9 in November 1994, prohibiting most local rent-control laws. Although the proposal was rejected by Boston voters, it passed statewide and took effect on January 1, 1995. The Boston City Council subsequently sought state authorization to restore rent control, but the effort was unsuccessful.

=== Big Dig and public transit in the 2000s ===
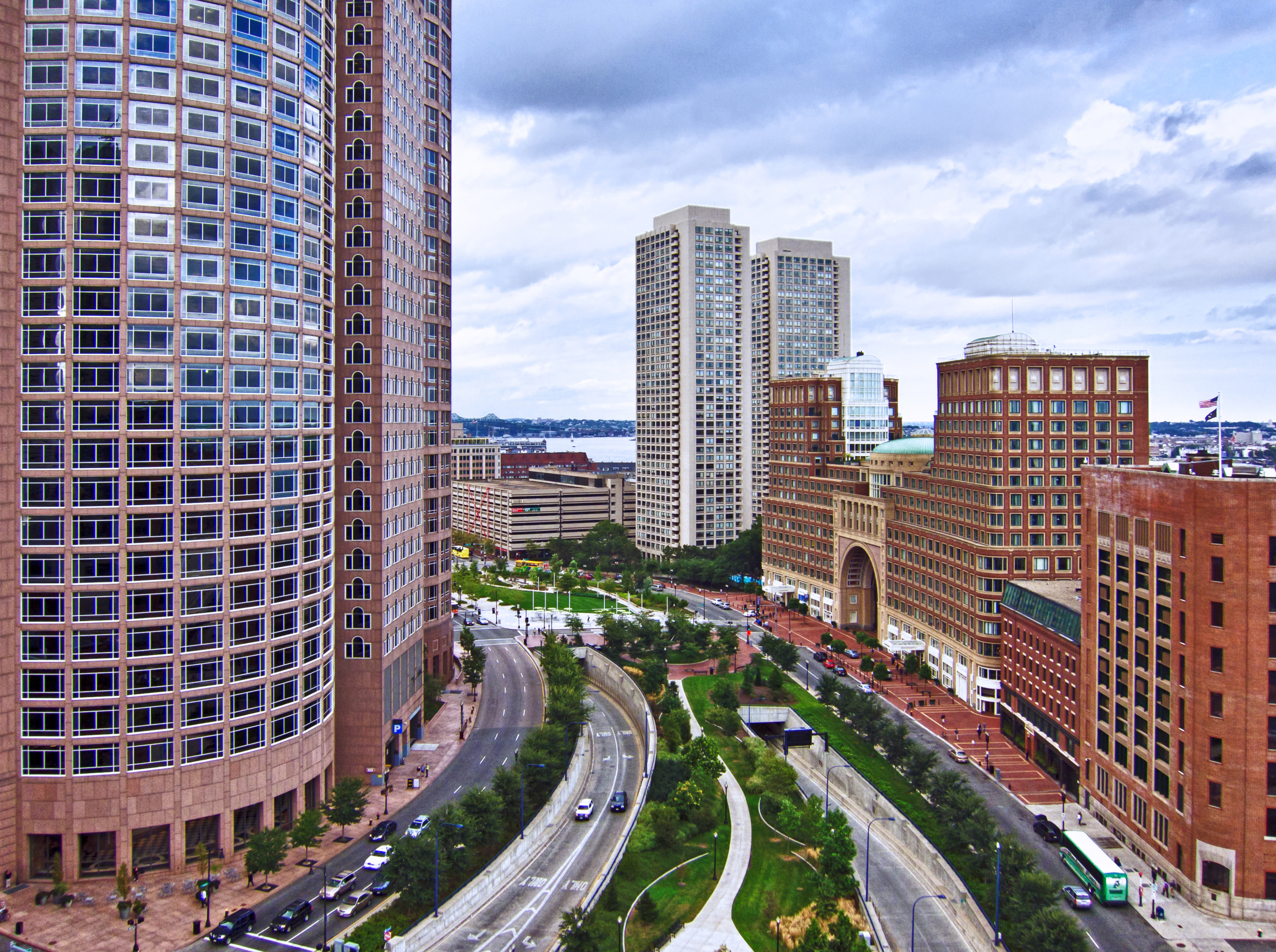
Boston's Rose Fitzgerald Kennedy Greenway is a result of the Big Dig.

In 2007, the Central Artery/Tunnel project was completed. Nicknamed the Big Dig, it had been planned and approved in the 1980s under Massachusetts governor Michael Dukakis. With construction beginning in 1991, the Big Dig moved the remainder of the Central Artery underground, widened the north–south highway, and created local bypasses to prevent east–west traffic from contributing to congestion. The Ted Williams Tunnel became the third highway tunnel to East Boston and Logan International Airport as part of the project. The Big Dig also produced the landmark Zakim Bunker Hill Bridge, and will create over 70 acres (280,000 m^{2}) of public parks in the heart of the city. The project as a whole has eased (but not eliminated) Boston's notorious traffic congestion; however, it is the most expensive construction project in United States history.

The city also saw other transportation projects, including improvement and expansion to its mass transit system, notably to its commuter rail system to southeastern Massachusetts and the development of a bus rapid transit (BRT) system dubbed "The Silver Line." The maritime Port of Boston and Logan International Airport were also developed.

== 21st century ==
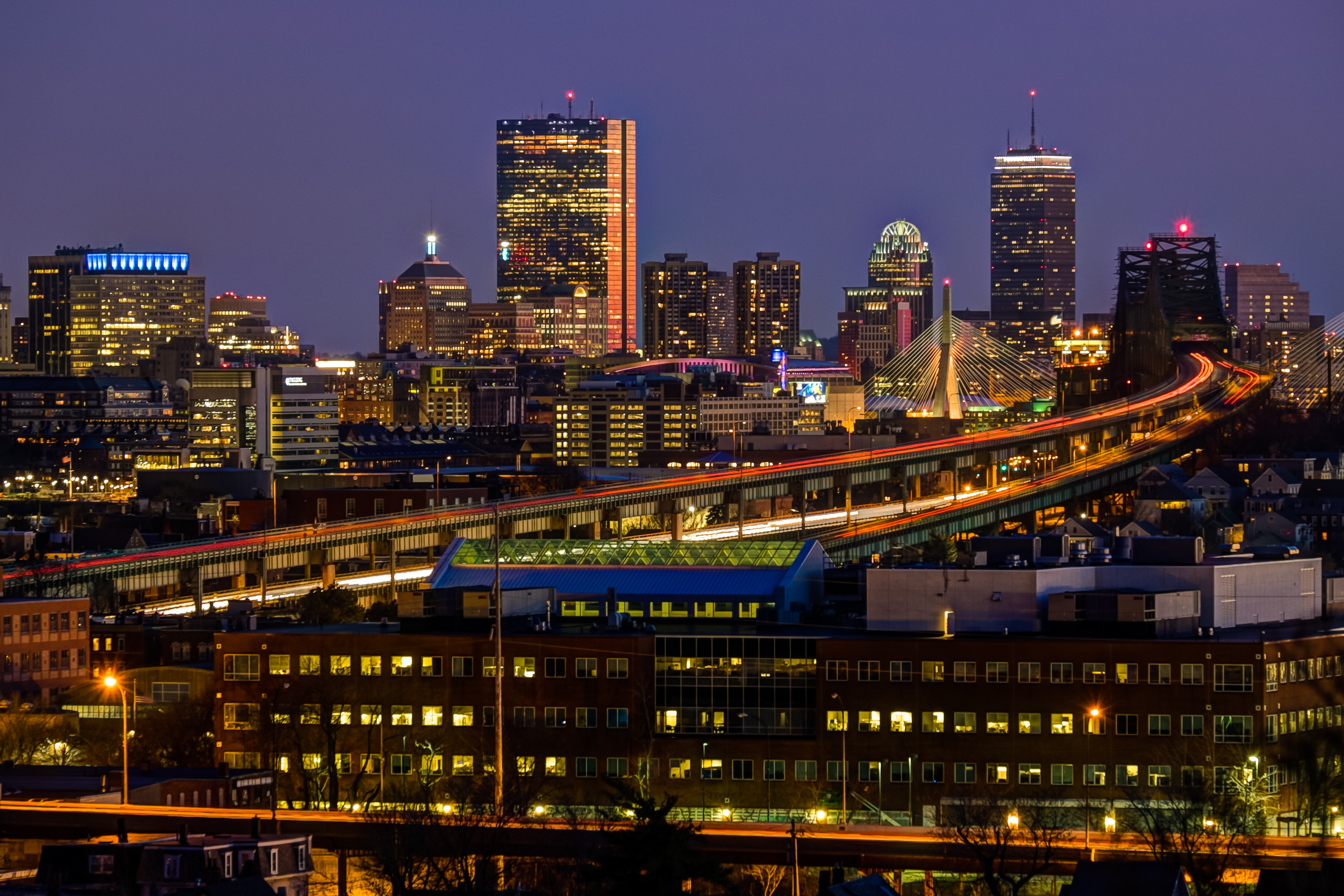
The Boston skyline from Chelsea, Massachusetts

Recently, Boston has experienced a loss of regional institutions and traditions, which once gave it a very distinct social character, as it has become part of the northeastern megalopolis. Examples include: the acquisition of the Boston Globe by The New York Times; the loss of Boston-headquartered publishing houses (noted above); the acquisition of the century-old Jordan Marsh department store by Macy's; and the loss to mergers, failures, and acquisitions of once-prominent financial institutions such as Shawmut Bank, BayBank, Bank of New England, and Bank of Boston. In 2004, this trend continued as Charlotte-based Bank of America acquired FleetBoston Financial, and P&G has announced plans to acquire Gillette.

Despite these losses, Boston's ambiance remains unique among world cities and, in many ways, has improved in recent years—racial tensions have eased dramatically, city streets bustle with a vitality not seen since the 1920s, and once again Boston has become a hub of intellectual, technological, and political ideas. Nevertheless, the city had to tackle gentrification issues and rising living expenses. According to Money Magazine, Boston is one of the world's 100 most expensive cities.

Boston was the host city of the 2004 Democratic National Convention. The city also found itself at the center of national attention in early 2004 during the controversy over same-sex marriages. After the Massachusetts Supreme Judicial Court ruled that such marriages cannot be banned under the state's constitution, opponents and supporters of such marriages converged on the Massachusetts State House as the state legislature voted on a state constitutional amendment that would define marriage as only between a man and a woman. Much attention was focused on the city and the rest of Massachusetts when marriage licenses for same-sex couples were issued.

Also in 2004, the Boston Red Sox won their first World Series in 86 years, following it up three years later with a victory in 2007, another in 2013, and another World Series win in 2018. Boston sports continue to dominate.

On April 15, 2013, two bombs were detonated during the Boston Marathon, killing three people and injuring hundreds.

On August 20, 2017, the .boston top-level internet domain (GeoTLD) officially started taking registrations.

== Geographic expansion ==
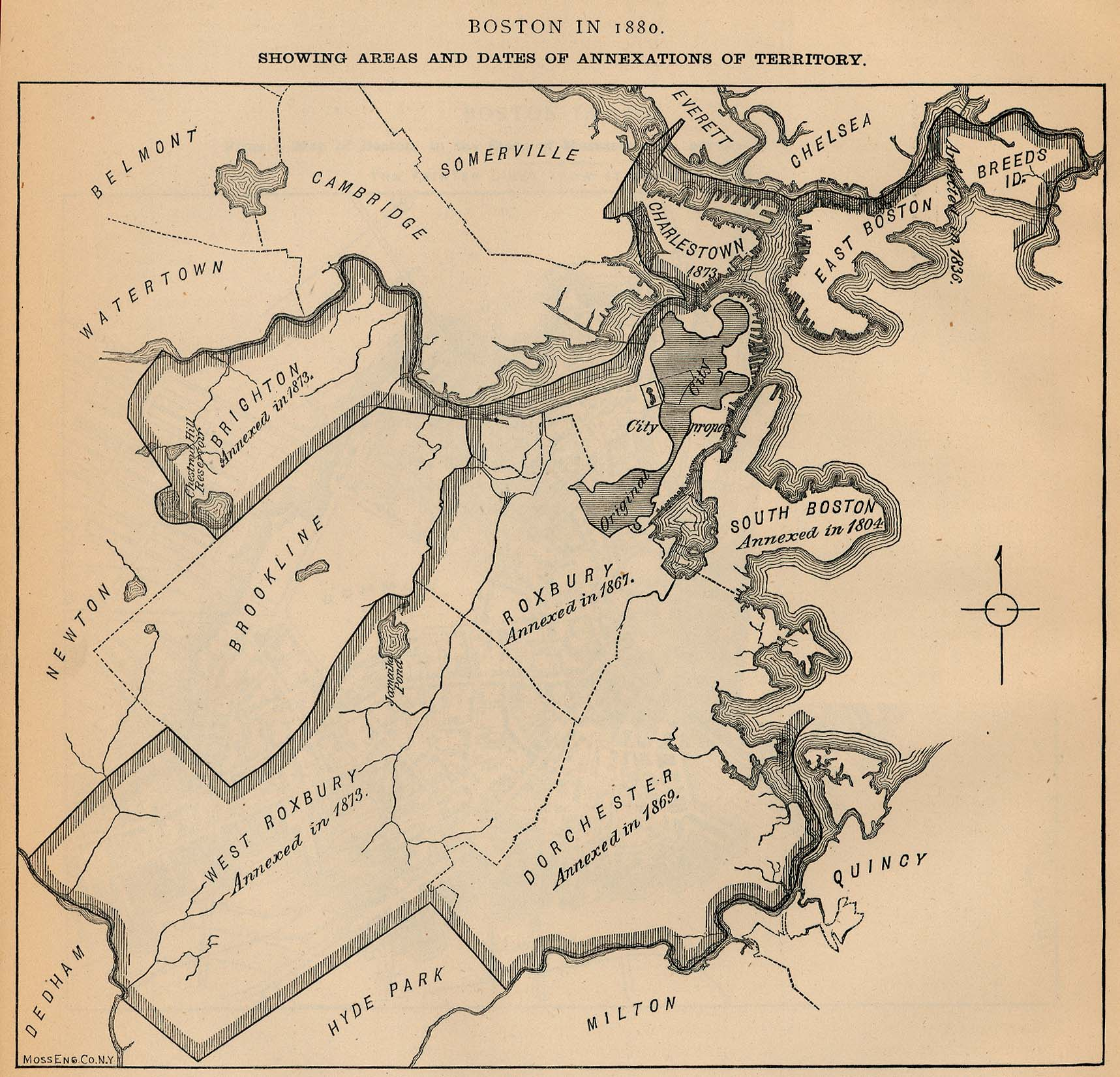
1880 census map showing landfill and annexations up until that year.

The City of Boston has expanded in two ways—through landfill and through annexation of neighboring municipalities.

Between 1630 and 1890, the city tripled its physical size by land reclamation, specifically by filling in marshes and mud flats and by filling gaps between wharves along the waterfront, a process Walter Muir Whitehill called "cutting down the hills to fill the coves." The most intense reclamation efforts were in the 19th century. Beginning in 1807, the crown of Beacon Hill was used to fill in a 50-acre (20 ha) mill pond that later became the Bulfinch Triangle (just south of today's North Station area). The present-day State House sits atop this shortened Beacon Hill. Reclamation projects in the middle of the century created significant parts of the areas now known as the South End, West End, Financial District, and Chinatown. After The Great Boston Fire of 1872, building rubble was used as landfill along the downtown waterfront.

The most dramatic reclamation project was the filling in of the Back Bay in the mid to late 19th century. Almost six hundred acres (240 hectares) of brackish Charles River marshlands west of the Boston Common were filled in with gravel brought in by rail from the hills of Needham Heights.

Boston also grew by annexing the adjacent communities of East Boston, Roxbury, Dorchester, West Roxbury (including Jamaica Plain and Roslindale), South Boston, Brighton, Allston, Hyde Park, and Charlestown, some of which were also augmented by landfill reclamation. Several proposals to regionalize municipal government failed due to concerns about loss of local control, corruption, and Irish immigration, including:

- 1896 – "County of Boston" proposal in the state legislature
- 1910 – "Real Boston" proposal by Edward Filene to create a regional advisory board
- 1912 – "Greater Boston" proposal by Daniel J. Kiley that would have enlarged the City of Boston to include all 32 municipalities within 10 miles
- 1919 – Annexation proposal by Boston Mayor Andrew Peters

The state government has regionalized some functions in Eastern Massachusetts, including the Massachusetts Bay Transportation Authority (public transit), the Massachusetts Water Resources Authority (water and sewer), and the Metropolitan District Commission (parks, later folded into the statewide Department of Conservation and Recreation).

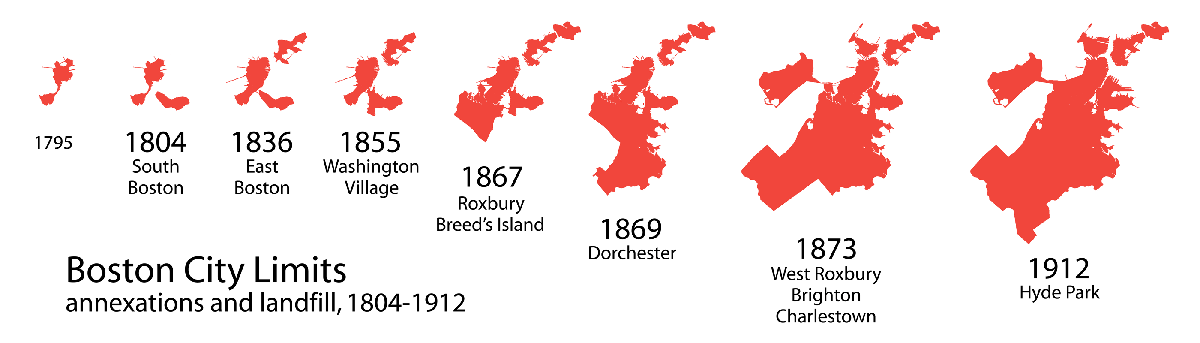
Annexations and Landfill, 1804–1912. (Some dates approximate, due to time lag between approval and completion.)

Timeline of annexations, secessions, and related developments (incomplete):

- 1705 – Hamlet of Muddy River split off to incorporate as Brookline
- 1804 – First part of Dorchester by act of the state legislature
- 1851 – West Roxbury (including Jamaica Plain and Roslindale) is split off from Roxbury as an independent municipality.
- 1855 – Washington Village, part of South Boston, by act of the state legislature
- 1868 – Roxbury
- 1870 – Last part of Dorchester
- 1873 – Boston-Brookline annexation debate of 1873 (Brookline was not annexed)
- 1874 – West Roxbury, including Jamaica Plain and Roslindale (approved by voters in 1873)
- 1874 – Town of Brighton (including Allston) (approved by voters in 1873)
- 1874 – Charlestown (approved by voters in 1873)
- 1912 – Hyde Park
- 1986 – Vote to create Mandela from parts of Roxbury, Dorchester, and the South End passes locally but fails citywide.

Timeline of land reclamation (incomplete):

- 1857 – Filling of the Back Bay begins
- 1882 – Present-day Back Bay fill complete
- 1890 – Charles River landfill reaches Kenmore Square, formerly the western end of the Back Bay mill pond
- 1900 – Back Bay Fens fill complete
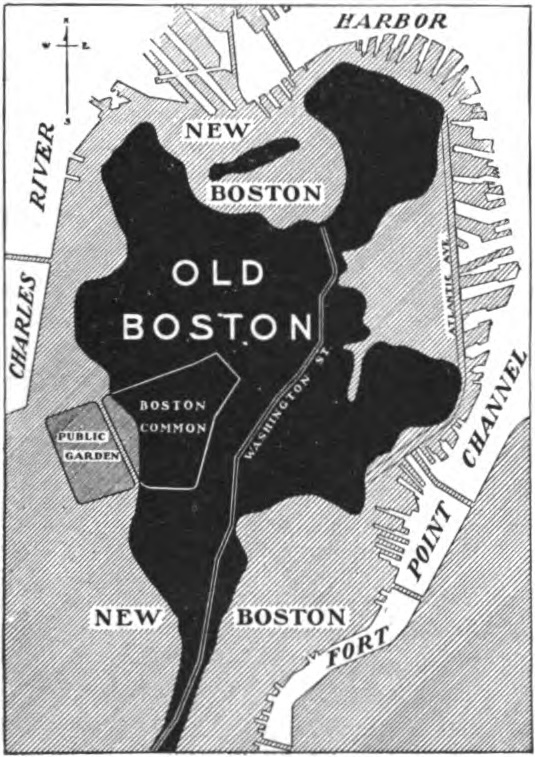
Original Boston shoreline vs. 1903

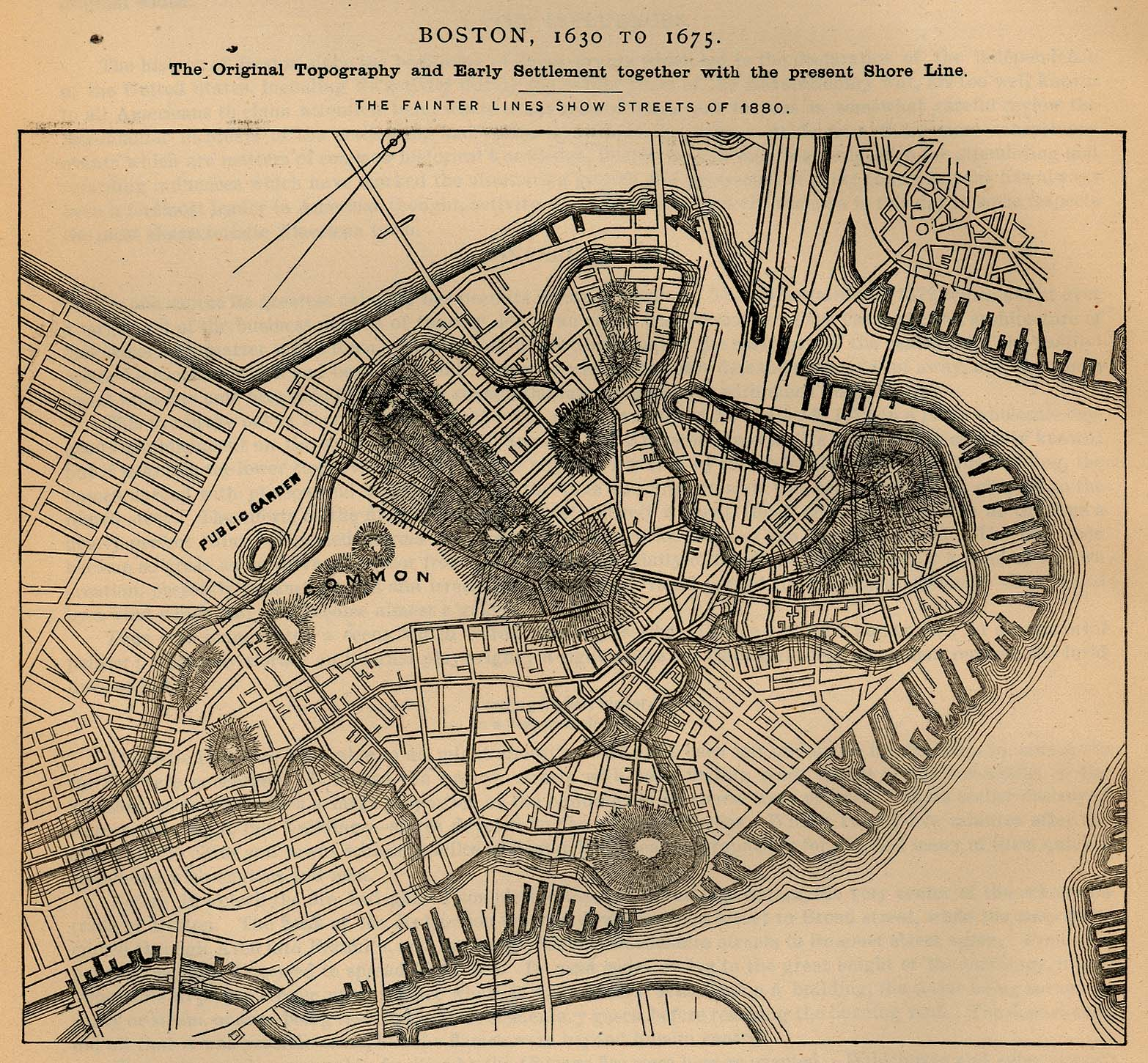
Boston in 1630 vs. 1880. The original area of the Shawmut Peninsula was substantially expanded by landfill.

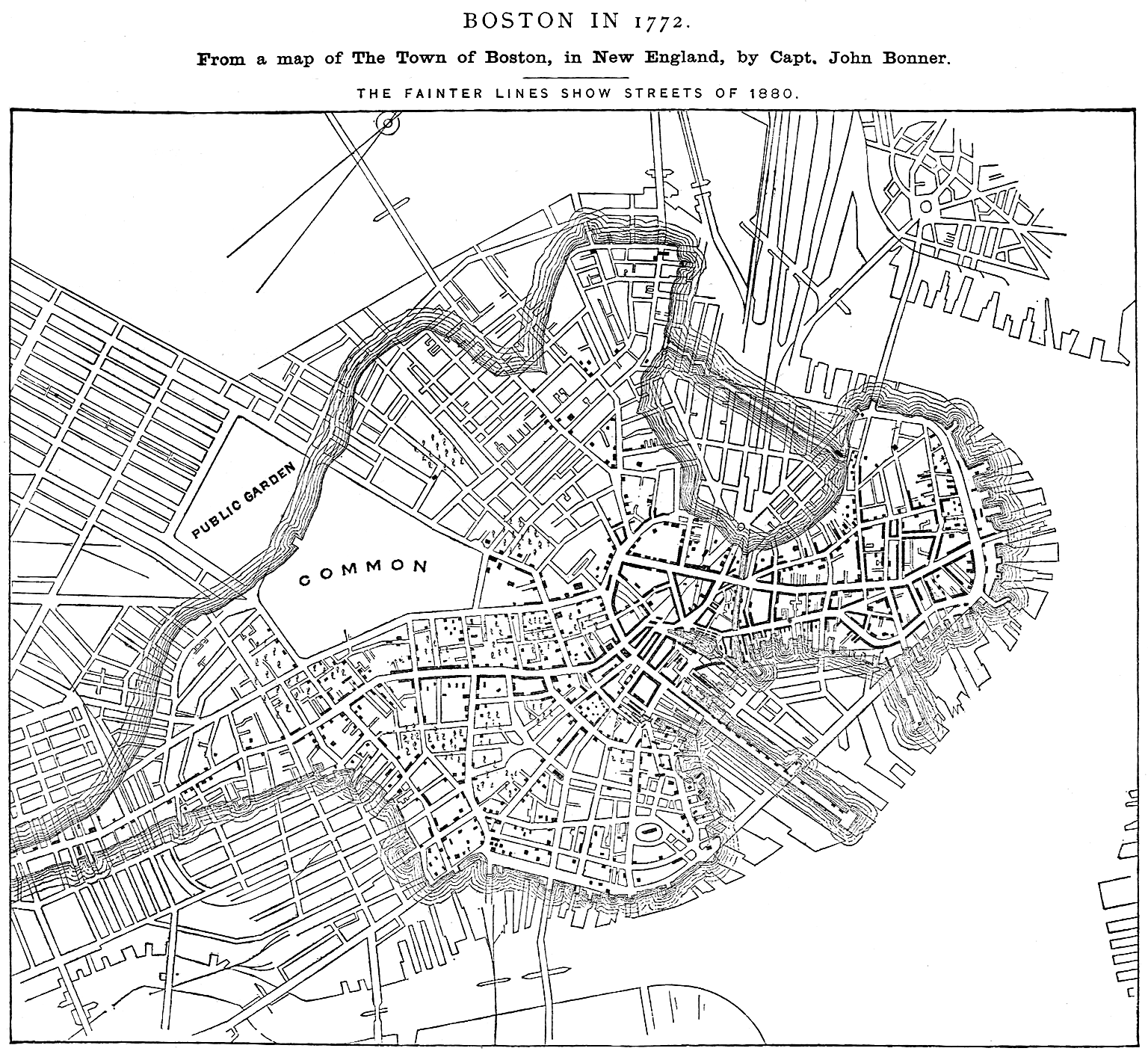
Boston in 1772 vs. 1880

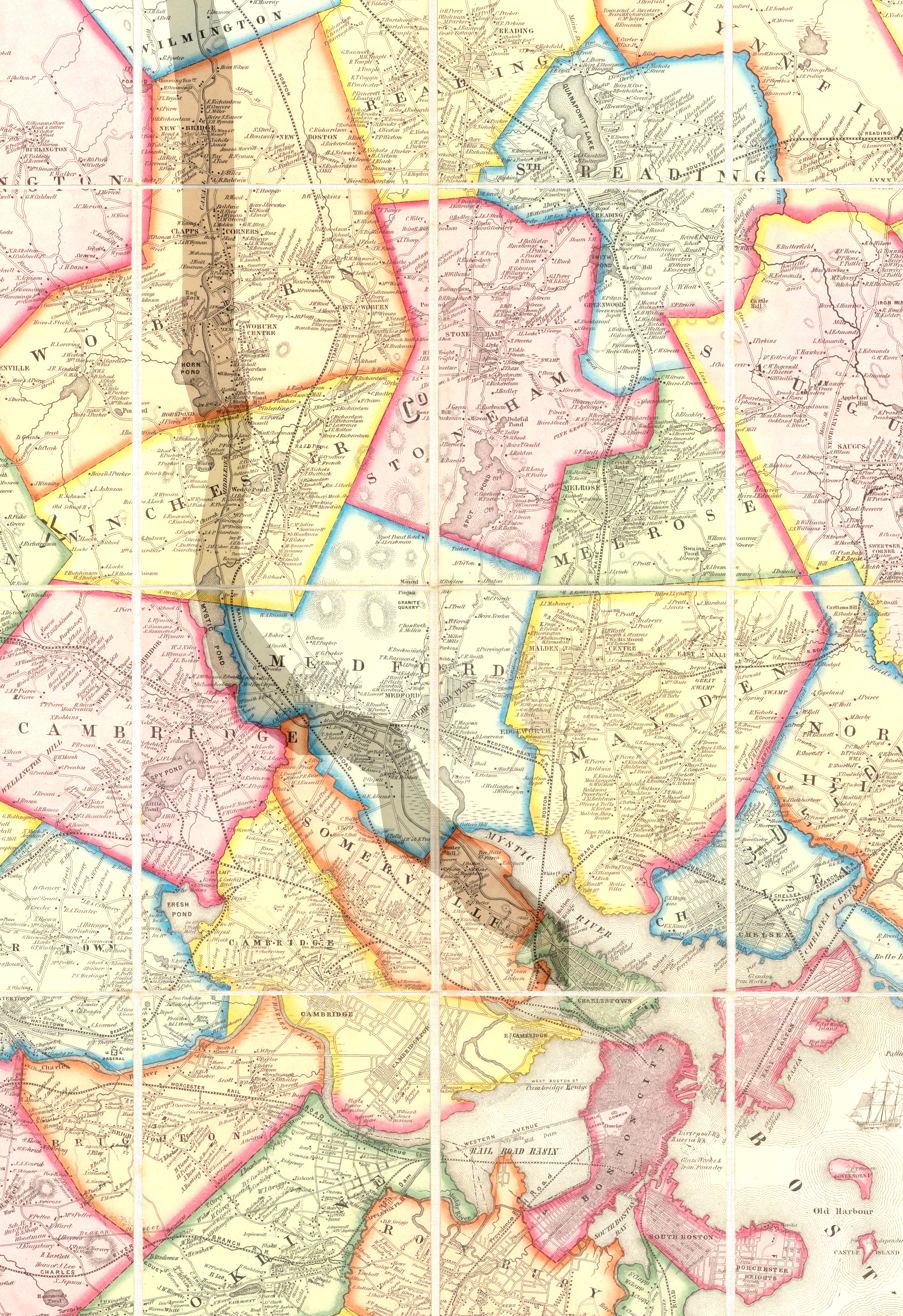
Greater Boston in 1850 (Middlesex Canal highlighted)

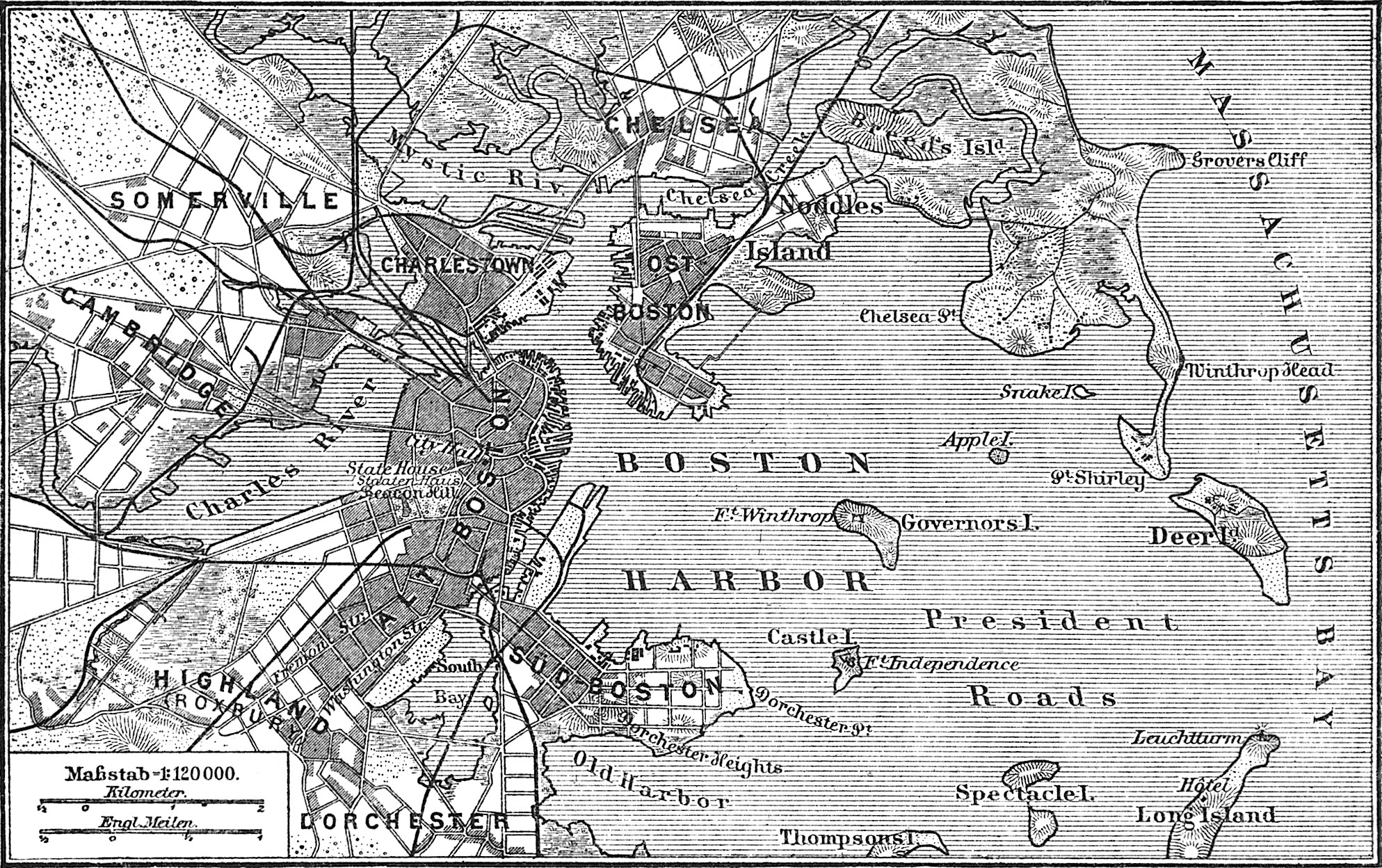
A larger view of Boston in 1890 (see also Colonial wide-area view, 1814 map, 1842 map, 1880 railroad map, 1903 map)

== See also ==
- American urban history
- List of newspapers in Massachusetts in the 18th century
- Timeline of Boston
- History of Irish Americans in Boston
- History of Italian Americans in Boston
- History of African Americans in Boston
