= Timeline of Boston =

Coordinates: 42.358°N 71.064°W

External videos
- Trolley Ride Through Boston (1903)
- Drive through Boston (circa 1958–1964)

This article is a timeline of the history of the city of Boston, Massachusetts, US.

== 17th century ==
- 1616 – Smallpox epidemic begins, ends with the death of 90% of the Neponset and Pawtucket people who lived in the region.
- 1625 – William Blaxton arrives.
- 1630 – When Boston was founded
  - English Puritans arrive.
  - First Church in Boston established.
  - September 7 (old style): Boston named.
- 1631 – Boston Watch (police) established.
- 1632 – Settlement becomes capital of the English Massachusetts Bay Colony.
- 1634
  - Boston Common established.
  - Samuel Cole opened the first tavern in Boston, Massachusetts on March 4.
- 1635 – Boston Latin School founded.
- 1636 – Town assumes the prerogatives of appointment and control of the Boston Watch.
- 1637 – Ancient and Honorable Artillery Company of Massachusetts founded.
- 1638
  - Desiré slave ship arrives.
  - Anne Hutchinson excommunicated.
- 1644 – "Slaving expedition" departs for Africa.
- 1648 – Margaret Jones hanged as a witch.
- 1649 – Second Church established.
- 1652 – John Hull and Robert Sanderson begin producing Massachusetts colonial coinage
- 1656 – Ann Hibbins hanged as a witch.
- 1657 – Scots Charitable Society of Boston founded.
- 1658 – Town-House built.
- 1660
  - June 1: Mary Dyer hanged as a Quaker.
  - Copp's Hill Burying Ground and Granary Burying Ground established.
- 1669 – Third Church built.
- 1679
  - Province House and Baptist church built.
  - Fire.
- 1680 – Paul Revere House built (approximate date).
- 1688 – King's Chapel built.
- 1689 – The Boston Revolt results in the overthrow of Sir Edmund Andros, unpopular governor of the Dominion of New England.
- 1690
  - September 25: Publick Occurrences newspaper begins publication.
  - London Coffee-House in business.
- 1692
  - Town becomes part of the British colonial Province of Massachusetts Bay.
  - Boston Overseers of the Poor established.
- 1699 – Brattle Street Church built.
- 1700 – North Writing School established.

== 18th century ==
=== 1700s–1760s ===
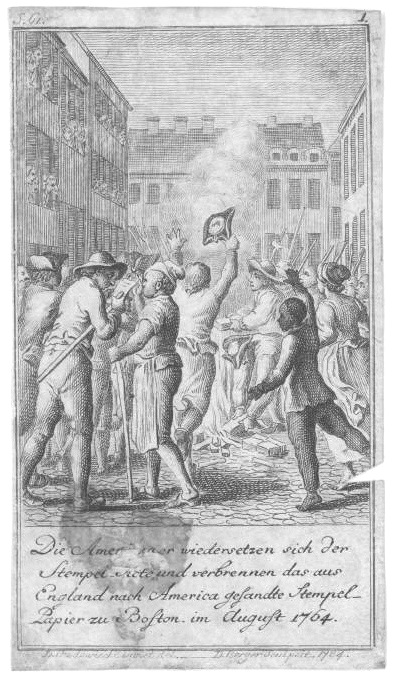
Stamp Act riot, 1764

- 1701 – Castle William (fort) rebuilt in harbour.
- 1704
  - Capen house built (approximate date).
  - April 24: The Boston News-Letter begins publication.
- 1705 – Benjamin Franklin born on Milk St.
- 1711
  - October: Fire.
  - Pierce–Hichborn House built (approximate date).
- 1712 – Crease's apothecary rebuilt.
- 1713 – May: Boston Bread Riot.
- 1716 – Boston Light erected in harbour.
- 1719 – December 21: Boston Gazette newspaper begins publication.
- 1721 – 1721 Boston smallpox outbreak
- 1722
  - John Bonner's map of Boston published.
  - Population: 10,567.
- 1723 – Old North Church built, Salem Street.
- 1729 – Old South Meeting House and Granary built.
- 1732 – Hollis Street Church established.
- 1733 – September 27: Rebekah Chamblit executed.
- 1735 – Trinity Church built on Summer St.
- 1737
  - Charitable Irish Society of Boston founded.
  - Saint Patrick's Day begins.
- 1738 – Workhouse built.
- 1742 – Faneuil Hall built.
- 1744 – Hospital active on Rainsford Island.
- 1745
  - March: Military expedition sails from Boston to Louisbourg.
  - November 5: Unrest during Pope's Night.
  - Bells installed in Christ Church.
- 1747 – Impressment triggers Knowles Riot.
- 1748 – Manufactory House established.
- 1752
  - Smallpox epidemic.
  - Concert Hall built.
- 1754 – Boston Marine Society incorporated.
- 1755 – November 18: Cape Ann earthquake.
- 1760
  - March 20: Great Boston Fire of 1760.
  - Population: 15,631.
- 1765 – Protest against Stamp Act.
- 1768
  - Britain's American Customs Board headquartered in Boston.
  - June 10: Protest against customs officials.
  - July: The Liberty Song published.
  - September: Massachusetts Convention of Towns held in Faneuil Hall.
  - October: British troops begin to arrive.

=== 1770s–1790s ===
- 1770
  - Massachusetts Spy newspaper begins publication.
  - March 5: Boston Massacre.
- 1772
  - Committee of correspondence formed.
  - Boston Pamphlet (rights declaration) published.
- 1773
  - Hutchinson letters affair
  - December 16: Boston Tea Party.
- 1774
  - January: Royal American Magazine begins publication.
  - March 31: Boston Port Bill blocks trade.
- 1775
  - April 19: Siege of Boston begins.
  - June 17: Battle of Bunker Hill takes place near town.
- 1776 – March 17: Siege of Boston ends; British depart.
- 1784 – Massachusetts Bank founded.
- 1785 – Massachusetts Humane Society headquartered in Boston.
- 1786 – Charles River Bridge built.
- 1787
  - April: Fire.
  - October 18: Massachusetts General Court receives U.S. Constitution.
  - African Masonic lodge active.
- 1788
  - January 9: Massachusetts convention to ratify U.S. Constitution begins at State House.
  - January 17: Convention to ratify U.S. Constitution moves to Federal Street Church.
  - February 6: Delegates ratify U.S. Constitution; Boston becomes part of the Commonwealth of Massachusetts.
  - February 8: Parade in honor of ratification of U.S. Constitution.
- 1789
  - William Hill Brown's The Power of Sympathy published.
  - Boston Directory and Massachusetts Magazine begin publication.
- 1790
  - Memorial column erected atop Beacon Hill.
  - Population: 18,320.
- 1791 – Massachusetts Historical Society founded.
- 1792
  - Board Alley Theatre opens.
  - Boston Library Society established.
  - J. & T.H. Perkins shipping merchant in business.
- 1793 – West Boston Bridge opens.
- 1794
  - Julien's Restorator opens on Milk Street.
  - February 3: Federal Street Theatre opening performance.
- 1795
  - Columbian Museum and Massachusetts Charitable Mechanic Association established.
  - Mount Vernon Proprietors in business.
  - Tontine Crescent built.
- 1796
  - Haymarket Theatre, African Society, and Boston Medical Dispensary established.
  - Otis House built in West End.
- 1797 – October 21: USS Constitution ship launched.
- 1798 – Massachusetts State House built on Beacon Hill.
- 1799 – Board of Health created.
- 1800 – Population: 24,937.

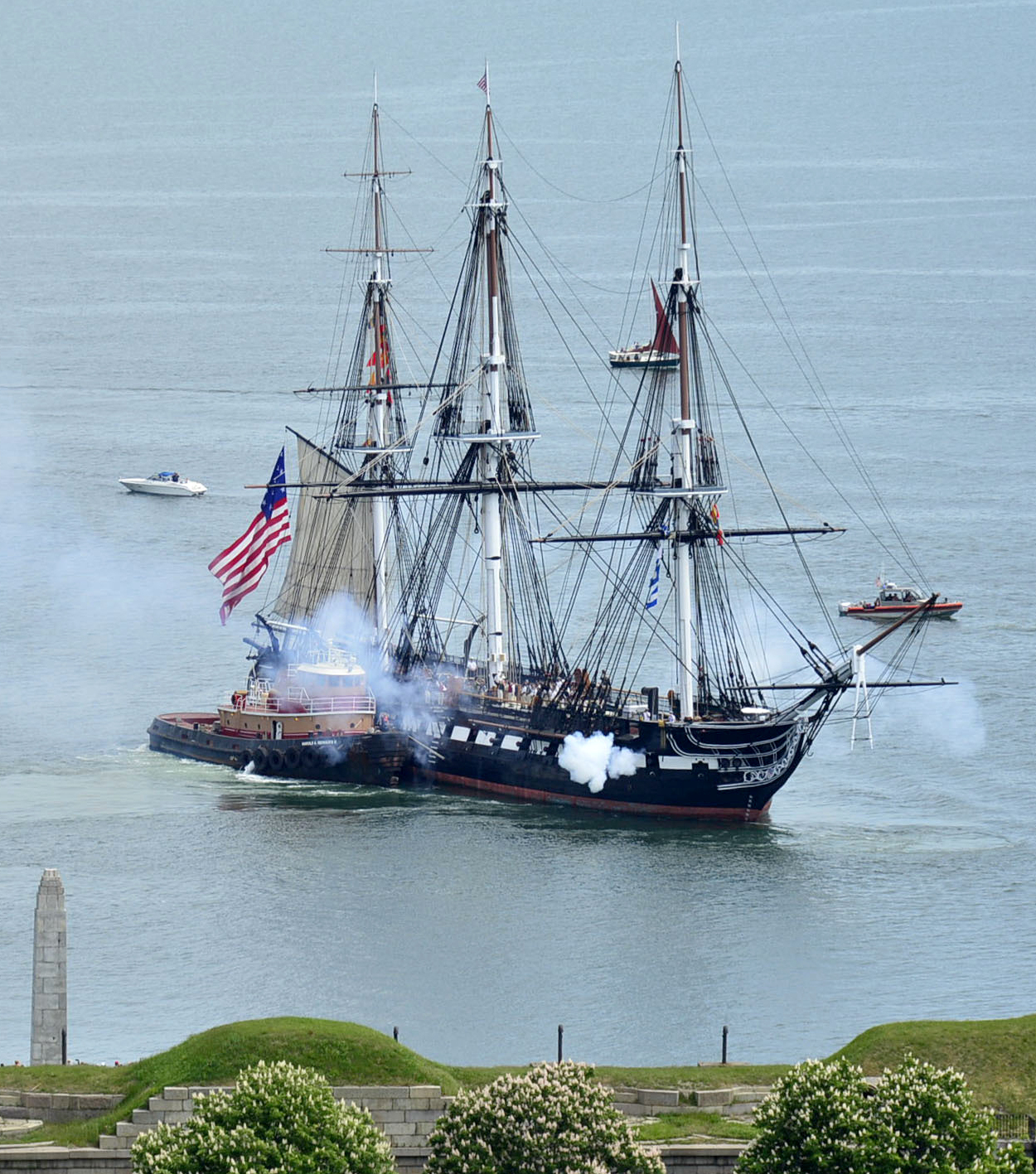
Constitution fires her cannons as she is tugged through Boston Harbor in 2021

== 19th century ==
=== 1800s–1840s ===
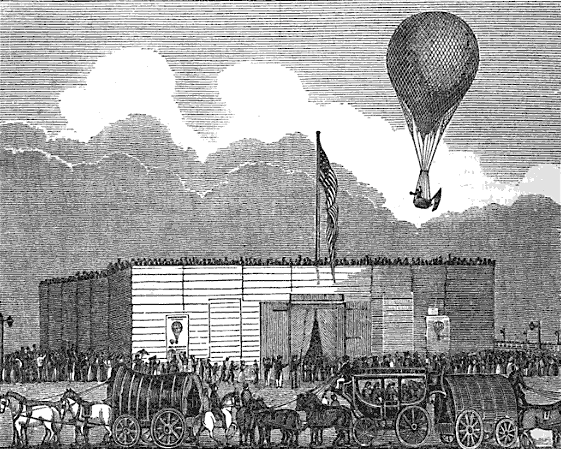
Flight of balloonist Charles F. Durant in Boston, September 13, 1834

- 1801 – Almshouse built on Leverett Street.
- 1803
  - Boston Female Asylum incorporated.
  - Holy Cross Church built.
- 1804
  - Anthology Club, Social Law Library, and Market Museum established.
  - Nichols house built.
  - Union Circulating Library in business.
- 1805
  - Ice merchant F. Tudor in business.
  - Boston Medical Library established.
- 1806 – African Meeting House and Old West Church built.
- 1807
  - Boston Athenæum founded.
  - Charles Street Meeting House built.
- 1808 – Roman Catholic diocese of Boston established; John Cheverus becomes bishop.
- 1809 – Craigie Bridge opens.
- 1810
  - American Board of Commissioners for Foreign Missions headquartered in Boston.
  - Boylston Market and Park Street Church built.
  - Philharmonic Society established (approximate date).
  - Bryant & Sturgis shipping merchants in business.
- 1811 – Massachusetts General Hospital and Boston Lyceum for the Education of Young Ladies established.
- 1812 – Fragment Society founded.
- 1813 – Boston Daily Advertiser begins publication.
- 1814 – Linnaean Society of New England established.
- 1815
  - Handel and Haydn Society founded.
  - May: North American Review begins publication.
- 1816 – Provident Institution for Savings established.
- 1818
  - New-England Museum opens.
  - November 3: Exchange Coffee House burns down.
  - Methodist Episcopal Church established.
  - Annin & Smith in business (approximate date).
- 1819 – Cathedral Church of St. Paul built.
- 1820 – Mercantile Library Association established.
- 1821
  - English Classical School established.
  - Doggett's Repository of Arts opens (approximate date).
- 1822
  - Boston incorporated as a city.
  - Leverett Street Jail opens; old jail closes.
  - May 1: John Phillips becomes mayor.
- 1823
  - Chickering and Sons piano manufacturer in business.
  - Josiah Quincy III becomes mayor.
  - City seal design adopted.
- 1824
  - City auditor established.
  - Area of city: 783 acres.
- 1825
  - Pendleton's Lithography in business.
  - American Unitarian Association organized and headquartered in city.
- 1826
  - Massachusetts General Colored Association and House of Juvenile Reformation established.
  - Quincy Market built.
  - Atwood & Bacon Oyster House in business.
- 1827
  - September 24: Tremont Theatre opens.
  - Boston Seaman's Friend Society organized.
  - Papanti's dancing school in business.
- 1829
  - Boston Society for the Diffusion of Useful Knowledge and Boston Lyceum established.
  - Harrison Gray Otis becomes mayor.
  - Tremont House built.
  - Walker's An Appeal to the Colored Citizens of the World published.

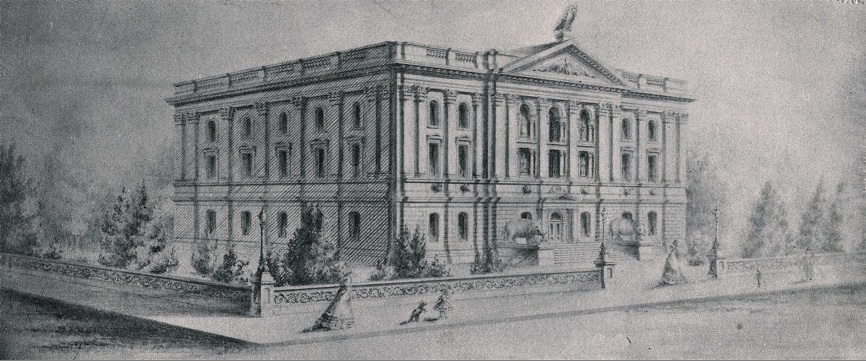
New England Museum of Natural History, corner of Boylston and Berkeley Streets, Back Bay, Boston, 19th century

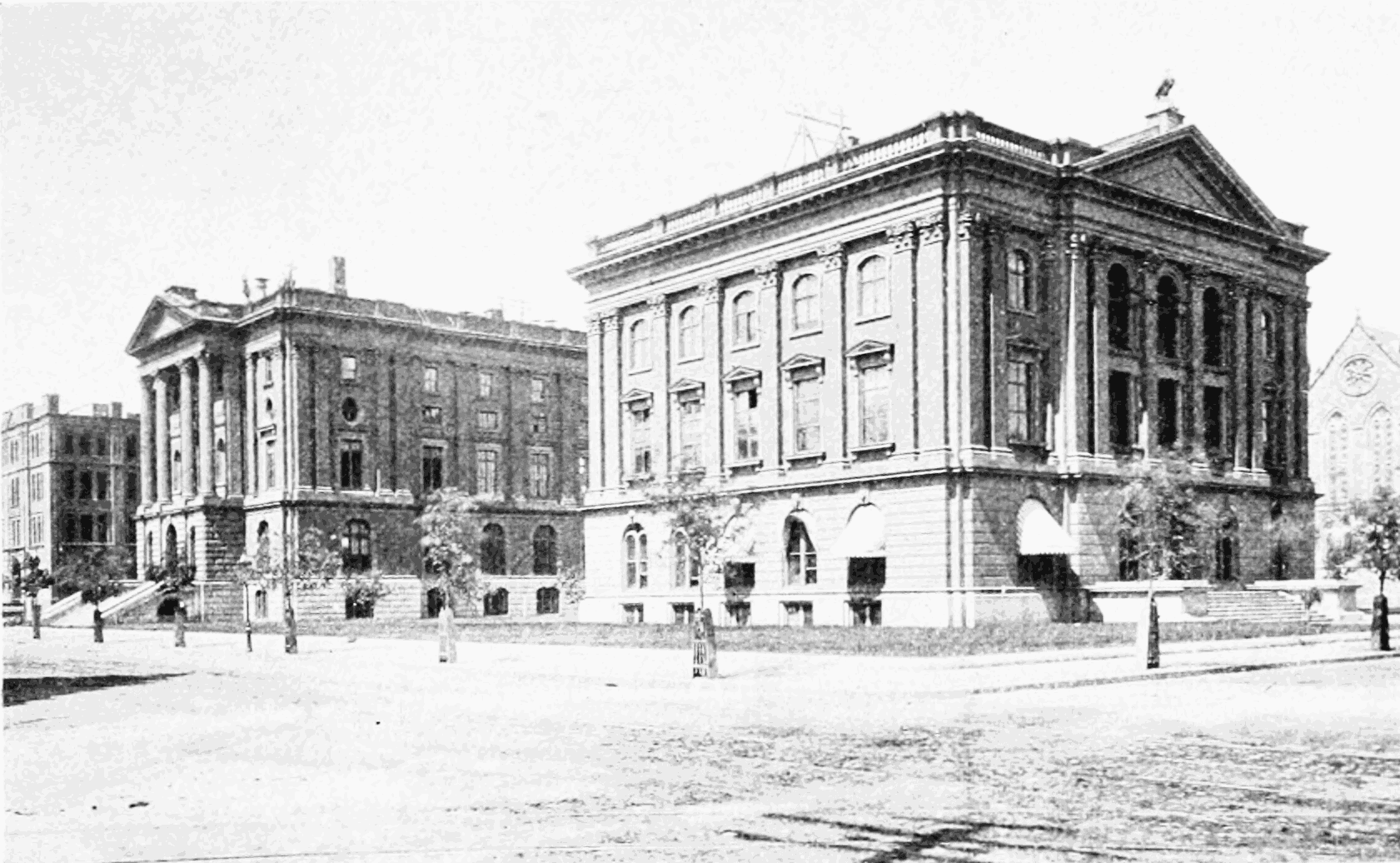
Boston Society of Natural History and Rogers Building, Photographie

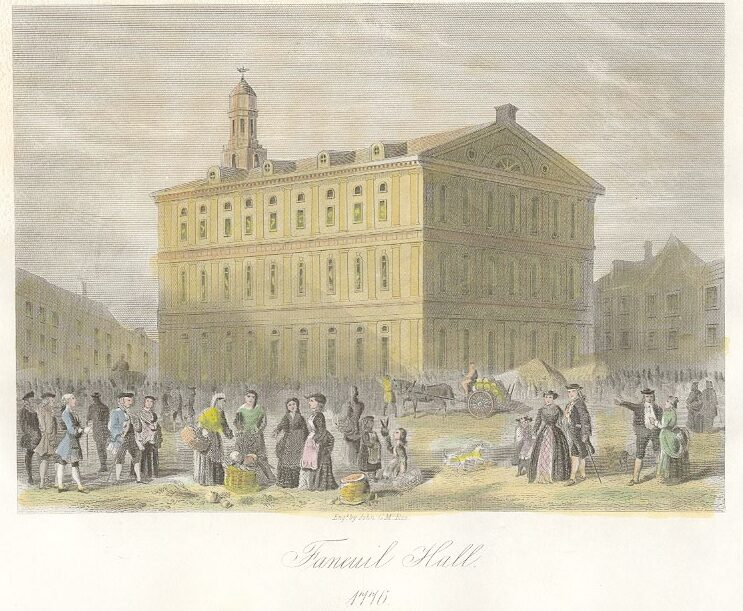
Faneuil Hall in 1830

- 1830
  - Boston Society of Natural History established.
  - July 24: Boston Evening Transcript begins publication.
  - Population: 61,392.
- 1831
  - The Liberator and The Boston Post begin publication.
  - New England Anti-Slavery Society established.
  - S.S. Pierce in business.
- 1832
  - Boston Lying-In Hospital and Afric-American Female Intelligence Society established.
  - Charles Wells becomes mayor.
- 1833
  - The Boston Journal newspaper begins publication.
  - Boston Female Anti-Slavery Society, Boston Seaman's Aid Society, and East Boston Company founded.
  - Harding's Gallery active (approximate date).
- 1834
  - Parker & Ditson and Boston Sugar Refinery (East Boston) in business.
  - Temple School opens.
  - Theodore Lyman becomes mayor.
  - Thompson Island becomes part of Boston.
- 1835 – Abiel Smith School and American House (hotel) founded.
  - William Lloyd Garrison attacked by anti-abolitionist mob.
- 1836
  - East Boston annexed to Boston.
  - Boston Pilot Catholic newspaper in publication.
  - National Theatre and Lion Theatre open.
  - Chamber of Commerce established.
  - Samuel Turell Armstrong becomes mayor.
  - Abolition Riot of 1836
- 1837
  - June 11: Broad Street Riot.
  - September 12: Montgomery Guards Riot.
  - Sylvester Graham Riot.
  - Samuel Atkins Eliot becomes mayor.
  - Harvard Musical Association organized.
- 1838 – African Methodist Episcopal Zion Church established.
- 1839
  - Lowell Institute lectures begin.
  - Melodeon opens.
  - City lunatic asylum established.
- 1840
  - Friends of Ireland society founded.
  - Durgin-Park restaurant and Peabody's West Street Bookstore in business.
  - Cunard's steamship Britannia sails from Liverpool to Boston.
  - Population: 93,383.
  - Jonathan Chapman becomes mayor.
- 1841
  - Boston and Albany Railroad in operation.
  - Boston Museum, Boston Artists' Association, and Plumbe's photo gallery established.
  - Probation for prisoners introduced.
- 1842 – Merchants Exchange built.
- 1843
  - Tremont Temple established.
  - Martin Brimmer becomes mayor.
- 1844
  - Liverpool-Boston "White Diamond Line" begins operating.
  - Phillips School established.
- 1845
  - Chinese Museum, Howard Athenaeum, and New England Historic Genealogical Society established.
  - Horticultural Hall built.
  - William Parker becomes mayor, succeeded by Thomas Aspinwall Davis, Benson Leavitt, and Josiah Quincy Jr.
  - McKay shipbuilder in business in East Boston.
- 1846
  - October 16: First public demonstration of the use of inhaled ether as a surgical anesthetic, Ether Dome.
  - J.B. Fitzpatrick becomes Catholic bishop of Boston.
  - John P. Jewett bookseller in business.
- 1847
  - City Point Iron Works, Bay State Iron Company, and Little, Brown and Company publisher in business.
  - Irish Immigrant Society and Needle Woman's Friend Society established.
- 1848
  - October 25: Water celebration.
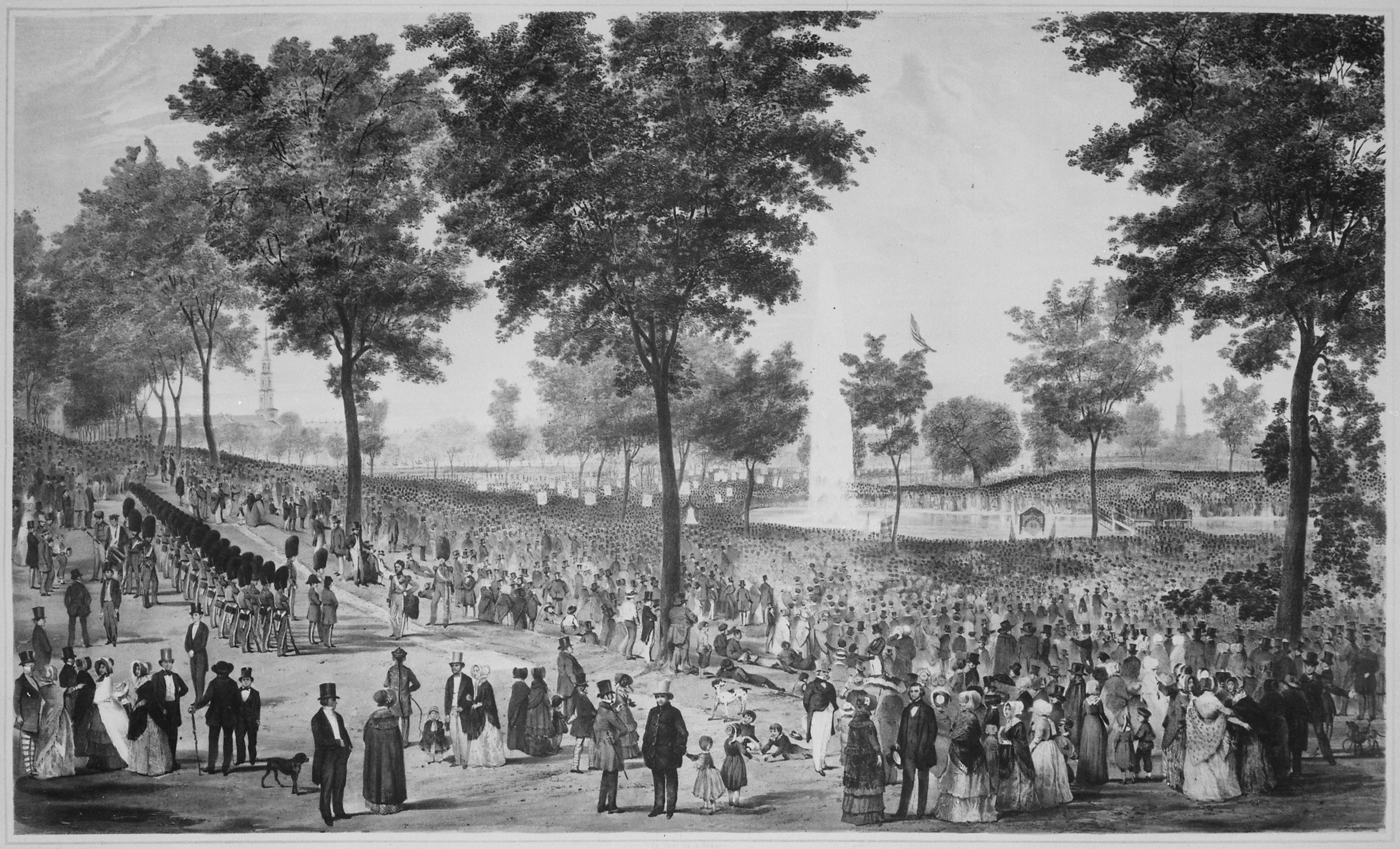
    Water Celebration on Boston Common, 1848 Lithograph.
  - C.F. Hovey and Co. in business.
  - Ladies Physiological Institute founded.
- 1849
  - Custom House built.
  - November 23: Beacon Hill Reservoir opens.
  - Mendelssohn Quintette Club founded.
  - John P. Bigelow becomes mayor.

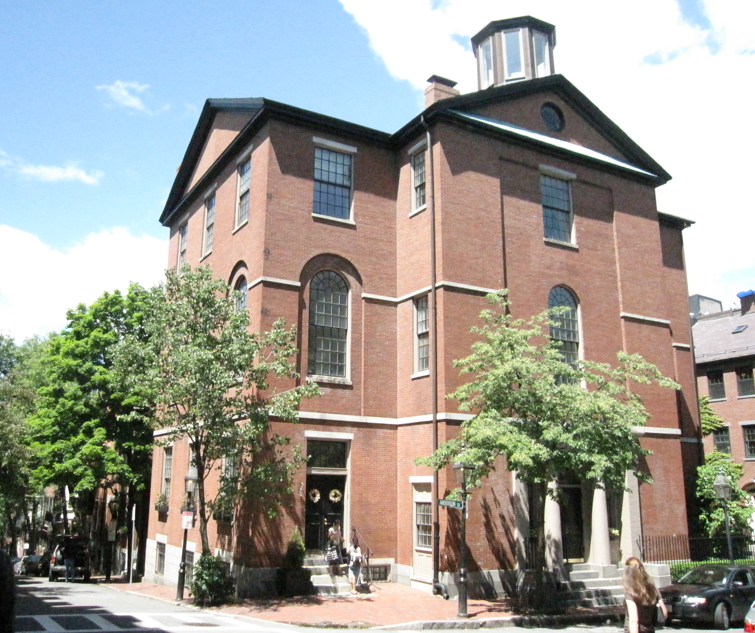
Phillips School at Anderson Street and Pinckney Street Boston

=== 1850s–1890s ===
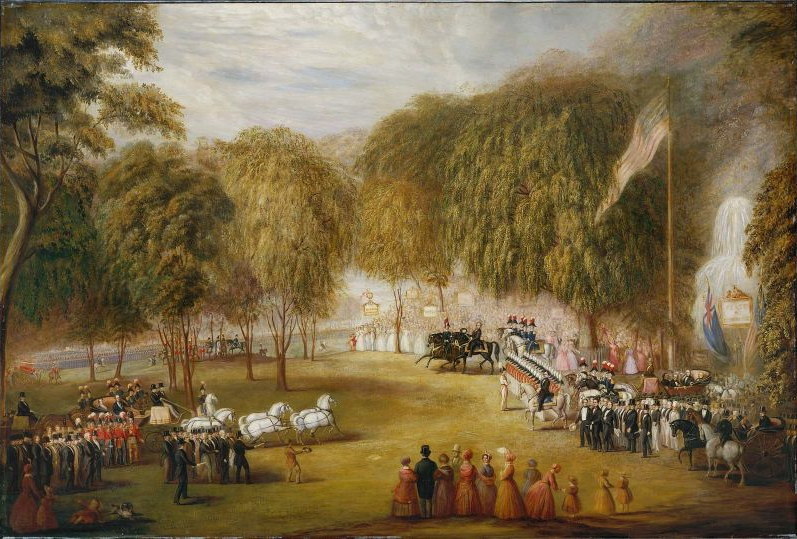
Railroad Jubilee on Boston Common, 1851; painting by William Sharp

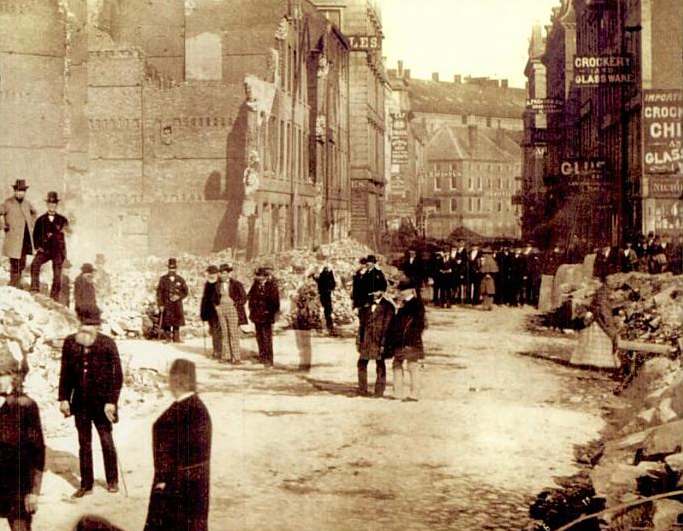
After the fire, 1872

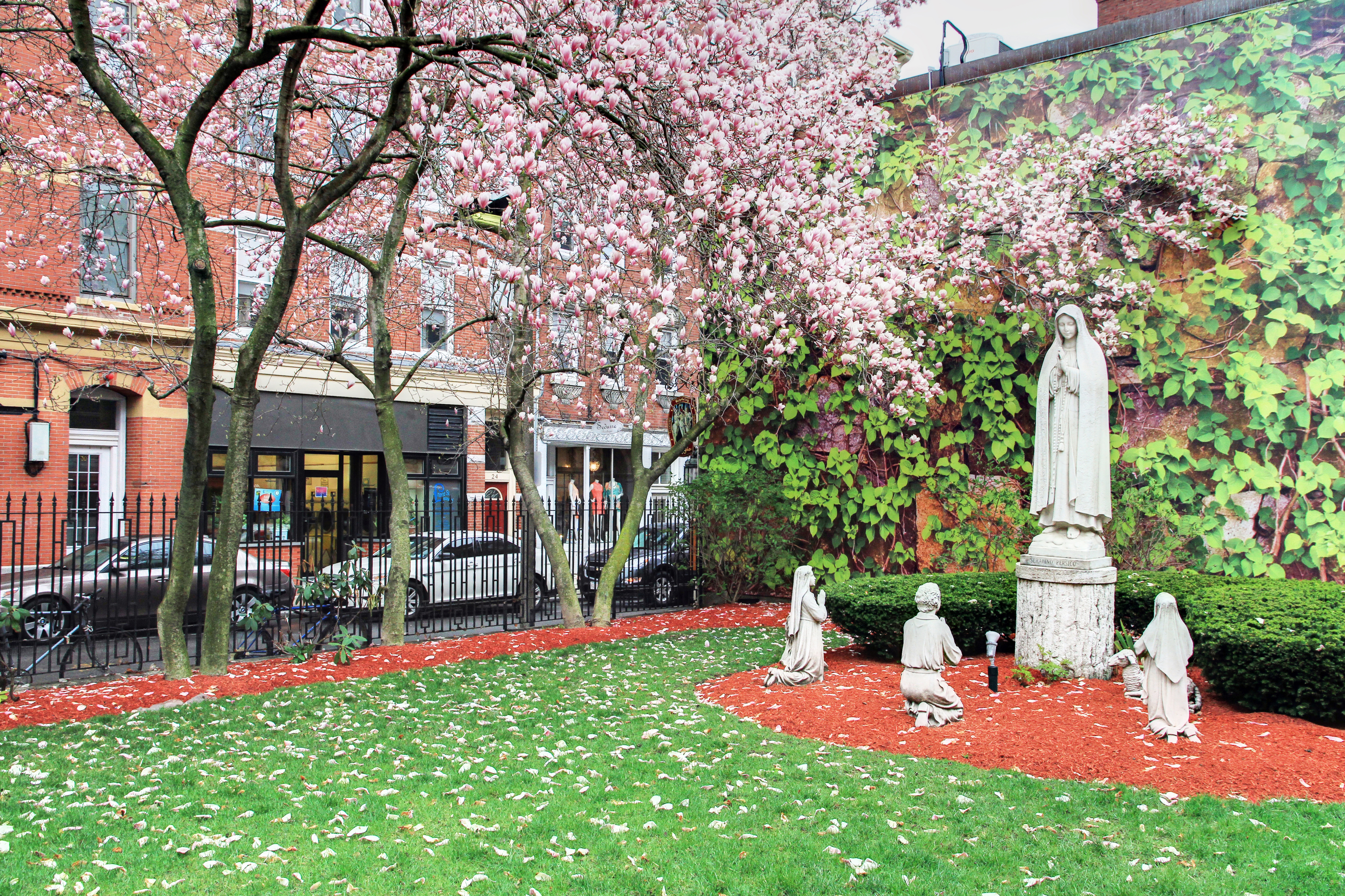
St. Leonard's Church

- 1850
  - Parkman–Webster murder case.
  - Fetridge and Company in business.
  - Roberts v. City of Boston racial segregation lawsuit decided.
- 1851
  - Charles Street Jail built.
  - Gleason's Pictorial Drawing-Room Companion begins publication.
  - September 17–19: Railroad Jubilee
- 1852
  - February 9: Ordway Hall opens.
  - October 24: Daniel Webster dies.
  - Sovereign of the Seas (clipper ship) launched.
  - Mount Hope Cemetery consecrated.
  - Orpheum Theatre built.
  - Sailors' Snug Harbor of Boston incorporated.
  - Somerset Club established.
  - Benjamin Seaver becomes mayor.
- 1853
  - Cambridge-Boston horsecar line established.
  - Henry Hastings & Company in business.
- 1854
  - Jerome V. C. Smith becomes mayor.
  - Boston Watch and Police ceased, and Boston Police Department came into being.
  - Boston Public Library, Adath Israel synagogue, and Boston Theatre open.
  - Boston Art Club founded.
  - Ticknor and Fields publishers in business.
  - May: Anthony Burns arrested; abolitionist unrest ensues.
  - July: City Regatta begins.
- 1855
  - Massachusetts Homoeopathic Hospital established.
  - Parker House hotel and Williams & Everett in business.
- 1856 – Alexander H. Rice becomes mayor.
- 1857
  - State Street Block built.
  - November 1: Atlantic Monthly begins publication.
- 1858
  - Frederic W. Lincoln becomes mayor.
  - Der Pionier German-language newspaper in publication.
  - Area of city: 1,801 acres.
- 1859
  - August: New England Colored Citizens' Convention held in city.
  - Boston Aquarial Gardens open.
- 1860
  - Public Garden and Gibson house built.
  - Old Feather Store demolished.
  - October 18: Edward VII of the United Kingdom visits Boston.
  - Young's Hotel in business.
  - Population: 177,840.
- 1861
  - Arlington Street Church and Studio Building constructed.
  - Emmanuel Church established.
  - Jordan Marsh opens.
  - Joseph Wightman becomes mayor.
- 1862 – Boston Educational Commission and Oneida Football Club founded.
- 1863
  - March 24: National Theatre burns down.
  - May 28: 54th Regiment Massachusetts Volunteer Infantry departs for South Carolina.
  - July 14: Protest against draft.
  - Boston College, Boston Children's Aid Society and Union Club of Boston established.
  - Hancock Manor demolished.
  - Frederic W. Lincoln becomes mayor again.
- 1864
  - New England Museum of Natural History built.
  - Boston City Hospital opens.
  - De Vries, Ibarra & Co. in business (approximate date).
- 1865
  - City Hall and Horticultural Hall built.
  - Massachusetts Institute of Technology opens.
  - Ropes & Gray in business.
  - Bostoner Zeitung German-language newspaper begins publication.
- 1867
  - New England Conservatory and Boston Society of Architects established.
  - YWCA Boston incorporated.
  - Otis Norcross becomes mayor.
  - December: Charles Dickens kicks off his second and final American reading tour at Tremont Temple
- 1868
  - Roxbury annexed to Boston.
  - Boston Lyceum Bureau established.
  - August 20: Chinese embassy visits Boston.
  - Woman's Board of Missions headquartered in Boston.
  - Nathaniel B. Shurtleff becomes mayor.
- 1869
  - June 15: National Peace Jubilee opens.
  - Boston University chartered.
  - Shreve, Crump & Low, Boston Musical Instrument Company, and Frost & Adams in business.
  - Boston Children's Hospital, Horace Mann School for the Deaf, and Evening High School established.
  - American Woman Suffrage Association headquartered in city.
- 1870
  - Dorchester annexed to Boston.
  - Woman's Journal begins publication.
  - Population: 250,526.
- 1871
  - May 16: South End Grounds open.
  - Globe Theatre and Apollo Club (chorus) established.
  - William Gaston becomes mayor.
- 1872
  - Lauriat's bookshop in business.
  - March 4: The Boston Globe newspaper begins publication.
  - June 17: World's Peace Jubilee and International Musical Festival opens.
  - November 9: Great Boston Fire of 1872.
- 1873
  - Old South Church and St. Leonard's Church built.
  - Brookline-Boston annexation debate of 1873.
  - Massachusetts Normal Art School and Catholic Union of Boston founded.
  - Henry L. Pierce becomes mayor, succeeded by Leonard R. Cutter.
- 1874
  - Allston, Brighton, Charlestown, Jamaica Plain and West Roxbury annexed to Boston.
  - Pastene's food shop in business.
  - Samuel C. Cobb becomes mayor.
- 1875 – Cathedral of the Holy Cross and Hayden Building constructed.
- 1876
  - February 15: Great Elm felled by storm, Boston Common.
  - July 4: Museum of Fine Arts opens on Art Square.
  - Appalachian Mountain Club headquartered in city.
  - Boston Merchants' Association and MIT Woman's Laboratory established.
- 1877
  - April: A telephone line connects Boston and Somerville, Massachusetts.
  - Trinity Church built.
  - Marcella-Street Home opens.
  - Women's Educational and Industrial Union and Footlight Club (theatre group) founded.
  - Frederick O. Prince becomes mayor.
- 1878
  - Gaiety Theatre opens.
  - New England Society for the Suppression of Vice founded.
  - Henry L. Pierce becomes mayor again.
  - Horatio J. Homer, Boston's first black police officer, is hired.
- 1879
  - Boston Cooking School, Massachusetts Bicycle Club, New England Manufacturers' and Mechanics' Institute, Copley Society of Art, Irish Athletic Club, and Park Theatre established.
  - Frederick O. Prince becomes mayor again.
- 1880
  - September 17: 250th anniversary of settlement of Boston.
  - Boston Conservatory of Elocution, Oratory, and Dramatic Art founded.
  - Population: 362,839.
- 1881 – Boston Symphony Orchestra, The Bostonian Society, Filene's, Boston Camera Club, and Associated Charities of Boston established.
- 1882
  - Bijou Theatre established.
  - Whitman's Leaves of Grass banned.
  - Samuel Abbott Green becomes mayor.
  - Long Island becomes part of Boston.
- 1883
  - Chickering Hall built.
  - Albert Palmer becomes mayor.
- 1884
  - August 4: Thomas Stevens (cyclist) arrives from Oakland, California.
  - Cyclorama Building built.
  - Tavern Club founded.
  - Augustus Pearl Martin becomes mayor.
  - Boston Ecclesiastical Seminary opens.
- 1885
  - Boston Pops Orchestra, North Bennet Street Industrial School, and New England Woman's Press Association established.
  - Hugh O'Brien becomes mayor.
  - Boston Fruit Company (importer) in business.
  - First Spiritual Temple built.
  - Children's playground opens in the North End.
- 1886 – June: New England Fair exhibition building burns down.
- 1887 – Forest Hills disaster
- 1888
  - Grand Opera House established.
  - Sacred Heart Church built.
  - Bellamy's fictional Looking Backward: 2000–1887 published.
- 1889
  - January 7: Thomas N. Hart becomes mayor.
  - Tremont Theatre opens.
  - Boston Architectural Club organized.
  - Thomas N. Hart becomes mayor.

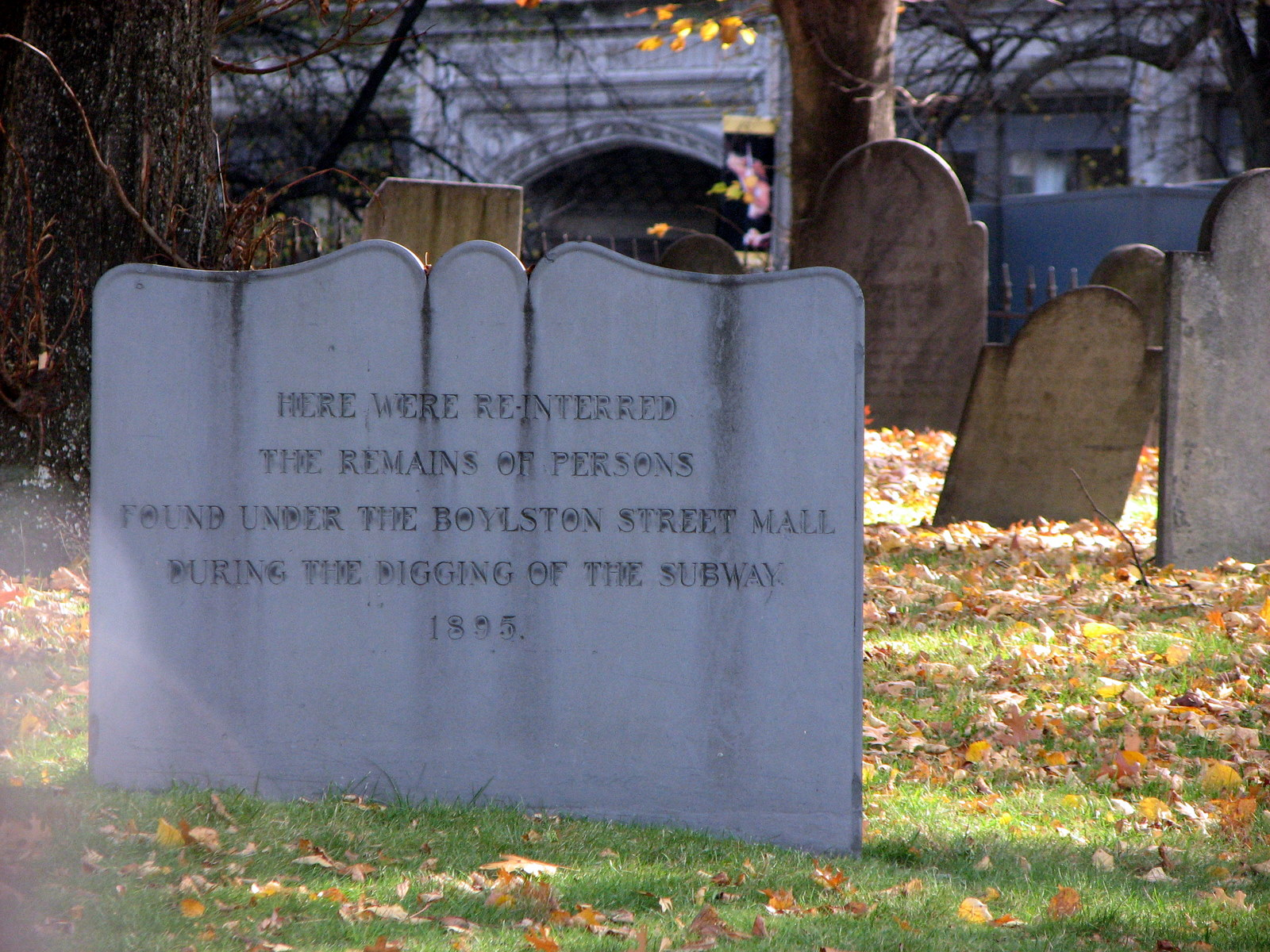
Central Burying Ground: "Here were interred the remains of persons found under the Boylston St. Mall during the digging of the subway, 1895" (photo from 2008)

- 1890
  - Boston Macaroni Company in business.
  - College Club founded.
  - Boston Courant newspaper begins publication.
  - New England Kitchen begins operating.
- 1891
  - Nathan Matthews Jr. becomes mayor.
  - Columbia Theatre and Lend a Hand Society established.
  - New Riding Club building constructed.
- 1892 – Denison House (settlement) and North End Union founded.
- 1893
  - Adams Courthouse built.
  - Grundmann Studios and Mechanic Arts High School established.
- 1894
  - The First Church of Christ, Scientist built.
  - Keith's Theatre and Epicurian Club of Boston established.
  - Immigration Restriction League headquartered in city.
- 1895
  - August: First National Conference of the Colored Women of America held in Boston.
  - Edwin Upton Curtis becomes mayor.
  - Boston Public Library, McKim Building built.
- 1896
  - Steinert Hall built.
  - Josiah Quincy becomes mayor.
  - Boston Cooking-School Cook Book published.
  - Jamaica Plain Tuesday Club formed.
- 1897
  - April 19: Boston Marathon begins.
  - September 3: Park Street (MBTA station) opens.
- 1898 – YMCA "Evening Institute for Younger Men" (precursor to Northeastern University) and Alliance Française established.
- 1899
  - South Station built.
  - Simmons College and Boston Rescue Mission founded.
  - Choate, Hall & Stewart in business.
  - MIT's Technology Review begins publication.
- 1900
  - Symphony Hall and Colonial Theatre built.
  - Colored American Magazine headquartered in Boston.
  - Thomas N. Hart becomes mayor again.
  - Population: 560,892.

== 20th century ==
=== 1900s–1940s ===
- 1901
  - January: L Street Brownies (swim club) plunge begins.
  - April 20: Huntington Avenue Grounds open.
  - Boston Red Sox and Boston Equal Suffrage Association for Good Government founded.
  - Horticultural Hall built on Massachusetts Avenue.
  - Boston Guardian newspaper begins publication.
  - Arcadia Hotel fire
- 1902
  - Patrick Collins becomes mayor.
  - June 23: First Commencement of YMCA "Evening Institute for Younger Men" (precursor to Northeastern University) is conducted, with Josiah Quincy (1859–1919) as the speaker.
  - Tennis and Racquet Club building constructed.

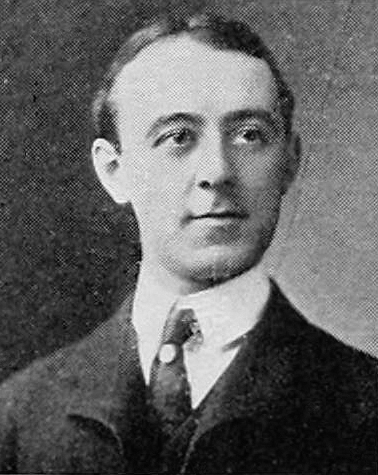
The future Col Edward L Logan and who the Airport is named after, his portrait as a state representative, during his time on the Committee on Metropolitan Affairs, 1902

- 1903
  - Isabella Stewart Gardner Museum, Catholic Charitable Bureau, and the Boston Society for the Protection of Italian Immigrants established.
  - Jordan Hall opens.
  - Gazzetta del Massachusetts newspaper begins publication.
- 1904
  - Wentworth Institute of Technology and Metropolitan Improvement League founded.
  - Cabot, Cabot & Forbes in business.
  - Fenway Studios built.
  - Universal Peace Congress held.
  - Boston American newspaper begins publication.
- 1905
  - Daniel A. Whelton becomes acting mayor.
  - Westland Gate built.
- 1906
  - John F. Fitzgerald becomes mayor.
  - Longfellow Bridge built.
  - Suffolk University, Boston City Club, and Junior League of Boston established.
- 1907 – Boston Finance Commission established.
- 1908
  - The Christian Science Monitor begins publication.
  - George A. Hibbard becomes mayor.
  - Boston Opera Company and Benjamin Franklin Institute of Technology established.
  - Women's Municipal League of Boston active.
  - Paul Revere House restored.
- 1909
  - Boston Flower Exchange and Boston Marine Museum founded.
  - Boston Opera House and Museum of Fine Arts open on Huntington Avenue.
- 1910

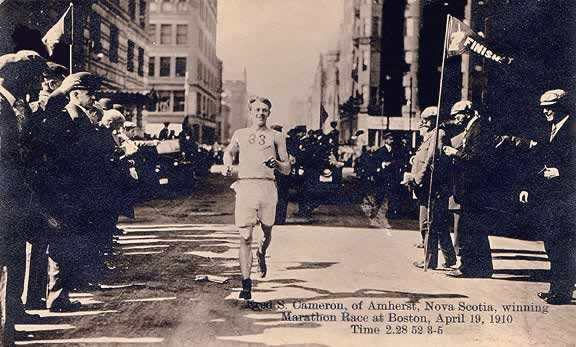
Boston Marathon Finish Line, 1910.

  - Charles River Dam Bridge built.
  - Chilton Club for women and League of Catholic Women established.
  - John F. Fitzgerald becomes mayor again.
  - Society for the Preservation of New England Antiquities, Armenian General Benevolent Union, and World Peace Foundation headquartered in city.
  - Boston Arena opens, and today the world's oldest operational indoor multisports facility.
- 1911 – Plymouth Theatre opens.
- 1912
  - January: Revere House hotel burns down in Bowdoin Square.
  - March: Red Line (MBTA) begins operating.
  - April 20: Fenway Park opens.
  - Hyde Park annexed to Boston.
  - St. James Theatre opens.
  - City Park and Recreation Department created.
  - Vedanta Center established (approximate date).
- 1913
  - Boylston Street Fishweir discovered.
  - Women's City Club and Boston Society of Landscape Architects established.
- 1914
  - James Michael Curley becomes mayor.
  - May 4: Exeter Street Theatre opens.
  - Guild of Boston Artists incorporated.
  - City Planning Board and Federal Reserve Bank of Boston established.
- 1915
  - April 26: Protest against screening of Birth of a Nation.
  - Custom House Tower built.
  - Artists League of Boston founded.
  - Boston Chronicle begins publication.
- 1916
  - November 7: Summer Street Bridge disaster.
  - Quong Kow Chinese School founded.
  - Massachusetts Institute of Technology relocates from Boston to Cambridge.
- 1917 – Boston School for Secretaries established.
- 1918

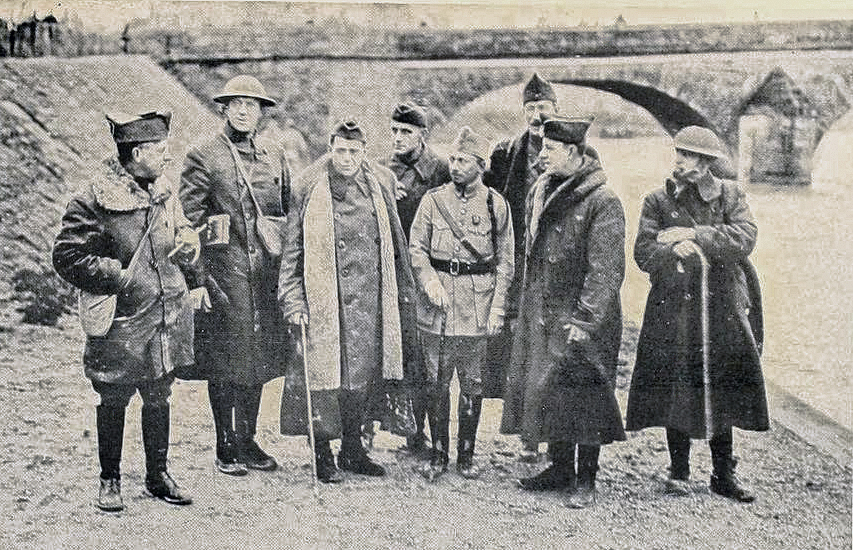
Colonel Logan (second from left) and staff, on the way to the Western front, March 1918

  - Andrew James Peters becomes mayor.
  - Red Sox win World Series.
- 1919
  - January 15: Great Molasses Flood.
  - September 9: Boston Police Strike.
  - Emmanuel College founded.
  - American Meteorological Society founded
- 1922

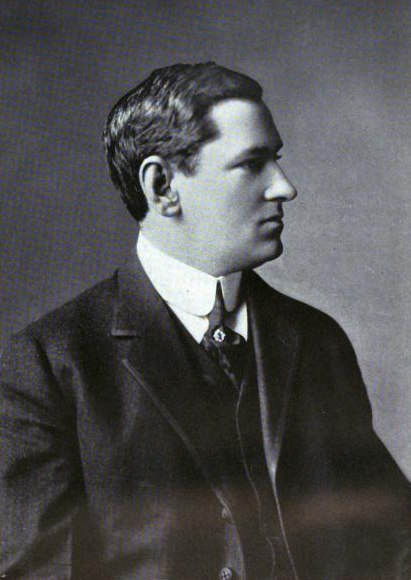
James Michael Curley during his second term as Mayor of Boston in 1922

  - Loew's State Theater (cinema) opens.
  - James Michael Curley becomes mayor again.
  - Boston Council of Social Agencies incorporated.
- 1923 – September 8: Boston Airport opens.
- 1924
  - WBZ (AM) radio begins broadcasting in Boston; it had originally debuted in Springfield in 1921.
  - International Institute of Boston opens.
  - The Boston Bruins professional ice hockey team is founded, one of the NHL's Original Six teams.
- 1925
  - Pickwick Club collapse
  - Metropolitan Theatre built.
- 1926 – Republican Malcolm Nichols becomes mayor.
- 1927
  - August 23: Sacco and Vanzetti executed.
  - Boston College High School incorporated.
  - Statler Hotel Boston opens for business.
- 1928
  - Boston University Bridge built.
  - November 17: Boston Garden opens.
  - Beacon Hill Garden Club founded.
  - John William McCormack becomes U.S. representative for Massachusetts's 12th congressional district.
- 1929 – Caffe Vittoria in business.
- 1930 – James Michael Curley becomes mayor yet again.
- 1932
  - Boston Municipal Research Bureau founded.
  - Charles/MGH (MBTA station) opens.
- 1933
  - Slifky's Reliable Oil Burner Service in business in Dorchester.
  - St. Stephen's Armenian Apostolic Church established.
- 1934
  - Frederick Mansfield becomes mayor.
  - Sumner Tunnel opens.
  - Calvin Coolidge College established.
- 1935 – Boston Housing Authority established.
- 1936 – Boston Museum of Modern Art founded.
- 1937 – Marquand's fictional The Late George Apley published.
- 1938 – Maurice J. Tobin becomes mayor.
- 1939
  - Wheelock College incorporated.
  - Housewives League of Boston founded.
  - Holy Name Church built.

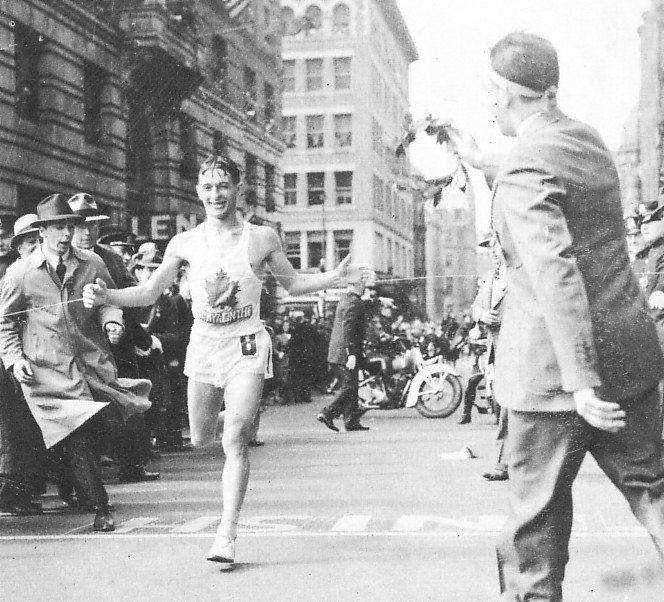
Gerard Cote winning the Boston Marathon, April 19, 1940

- 1940
  - Citgo sign erected.
  - Hatch Memorial Shell built.
  - Boston School of Pharmacy incorporated.
- 1941 – McCloskey's children's book Make Way for Ducklings published.
- 1942
  - November 28: Cocoanut Grove fire.
  - New England Chinese Women's Association headquartered in city.

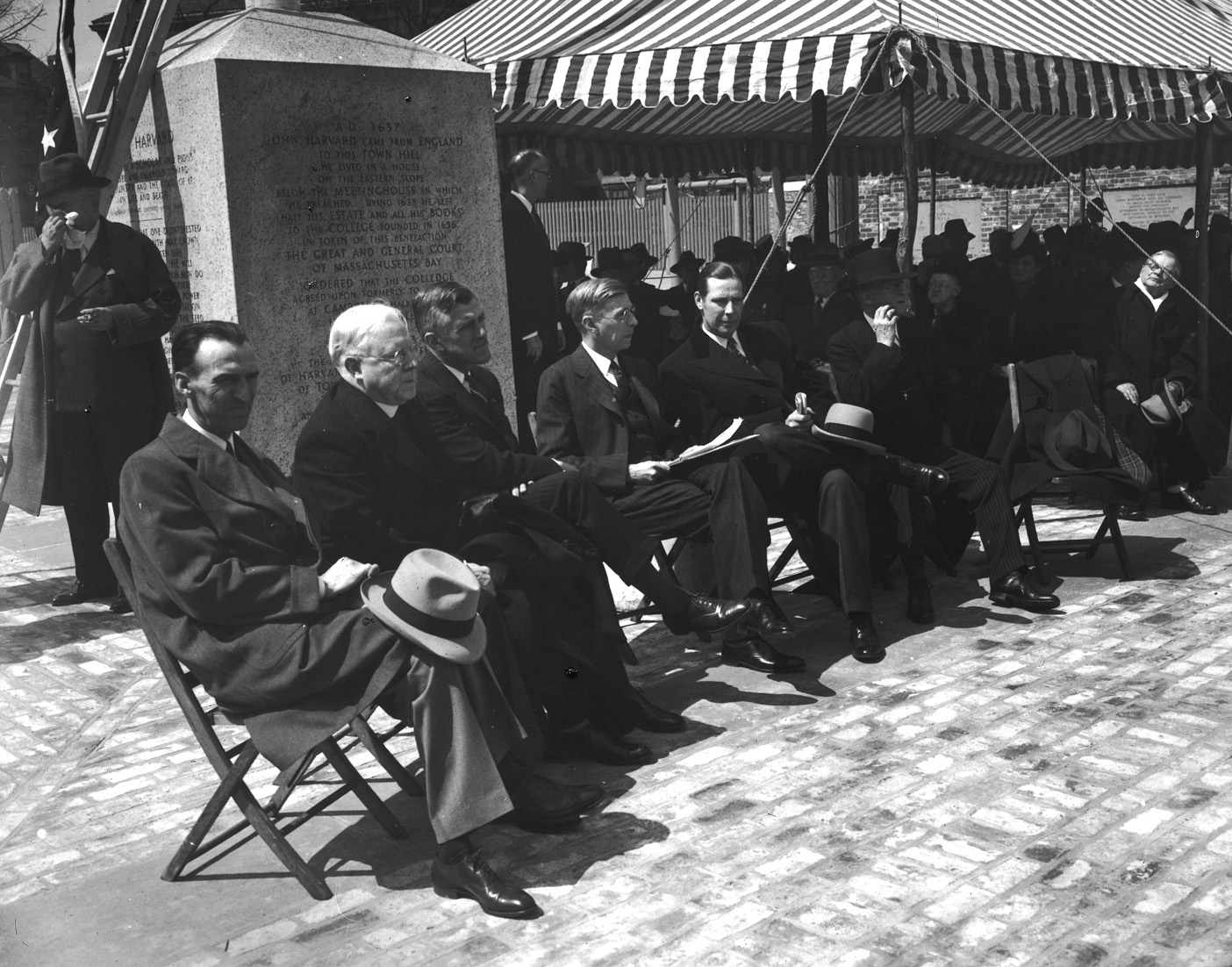
Mayor Tobin (seated, fifth from left) at the dedication of the John Harvard Mall on May 2, 1943

- 1944 – Fenway Garden Society established.
- 1945
  - John E. Kerrigan becomes acting mayor.
  - Schillinger House and French Library founded.
- 1946
  - Fidelity in business.
  - City Department of Veterans’ Services created.
  - Community Boating incorporated.
  - James Michael Curley becomes mayor yet again once more.
  - American Meteorological Society headquartered in city.
- 1947

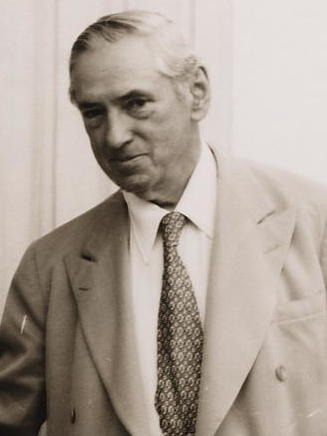
Curley during his final term in office in July 1949

  - Mayor Curley imprisoned; John Hynes becomes acting mayor.
  - Boston Trailer Park established.
  - Old John Hancock Building built.
  - John F. Kennedy becomes U.S. representative for Massachusetts's 11th congressional district.
  - Wally's nightclub in business.
- 1948 – WBZ-TV begins broadcasting, as the first television station in Boston to sign on the air.
- 1949 – Freedom House established.

=== 1950s–1970s ===
- 1950
  - January 17: Great Brink's Robbery.
  - Federation of South End Settlements and Elma Lewis School of Fine Arts established.
  - Population: 801,444.
- 1951
  - June 15: Storrow Drive opens.
  - October 6: WGBH (FM) begins broadcasting.
  - Museum of Science opens.
  - Long Island Viaduct (bridge) built.
- 1954 – Schillinger House renamed Berklee College of Music.
- 1955
  - May 2: WGBH-TV begins broadcasting.
  - June 5: Martin Luther King Jr. earns PhD from Boston University.
  - Saint Andrew Ukrainian Orthodox Church active.
  - Boston Catholic Television begins broadcasting.
- 1956
  - Boston Airport renamed Logan International Airport.
  - O'Connor's fictional The Last Hurrah published.
- 1957
  - Boston Redevelopment Authority and Gibson House Museum established.
  - WILD (AM) radio on the air.
- 1958
  - February 16–17: Snowstorm.
  - November: Funeral of James Michael Curley.
  - Freedom Trail established.
- 1959
  - Central Artery (freeway) built.
  - Sister city relationship established with Kyoto, Japan.
  - October 2: Total Solar Eclipse passes through city
- ca. 1959–60 – West End demolition
- 1960
  - March 3–5: Snowstorm.
  - October 1: Peace rally held.
  - Model United Nations conference held at Northeastern University.
  - Sister city relationship established with Strasbourg, France.
  - John F. Collins becomes mayor.
  - Razing of Mission Hill's historic district for three high-rise residences
- 1961
  - Callahan Tunnel and Boston Common Parking Garage open.
  - Puerto Rican Entering and Settling Service founded.
  - Massachusetts League of Cities and Towns headquartered in Boston.
- 1962
  - Scollay Square razed.
  - Caffe Paradiso in business.
- 1963
  - Metropolitan Area Planning Council and Boston Ballet founded.
  - The French Chef television cooking program begins broadcasting.
- 1964
  - Prudential Tower built.
  - University of Massachusetts Boston and Massachusetts Bay Transportation Authority established.
  - May 22: Bellflower Street fire in Dorchester.
- 1965 – April 23: Civil rights rally held on Boston Common.

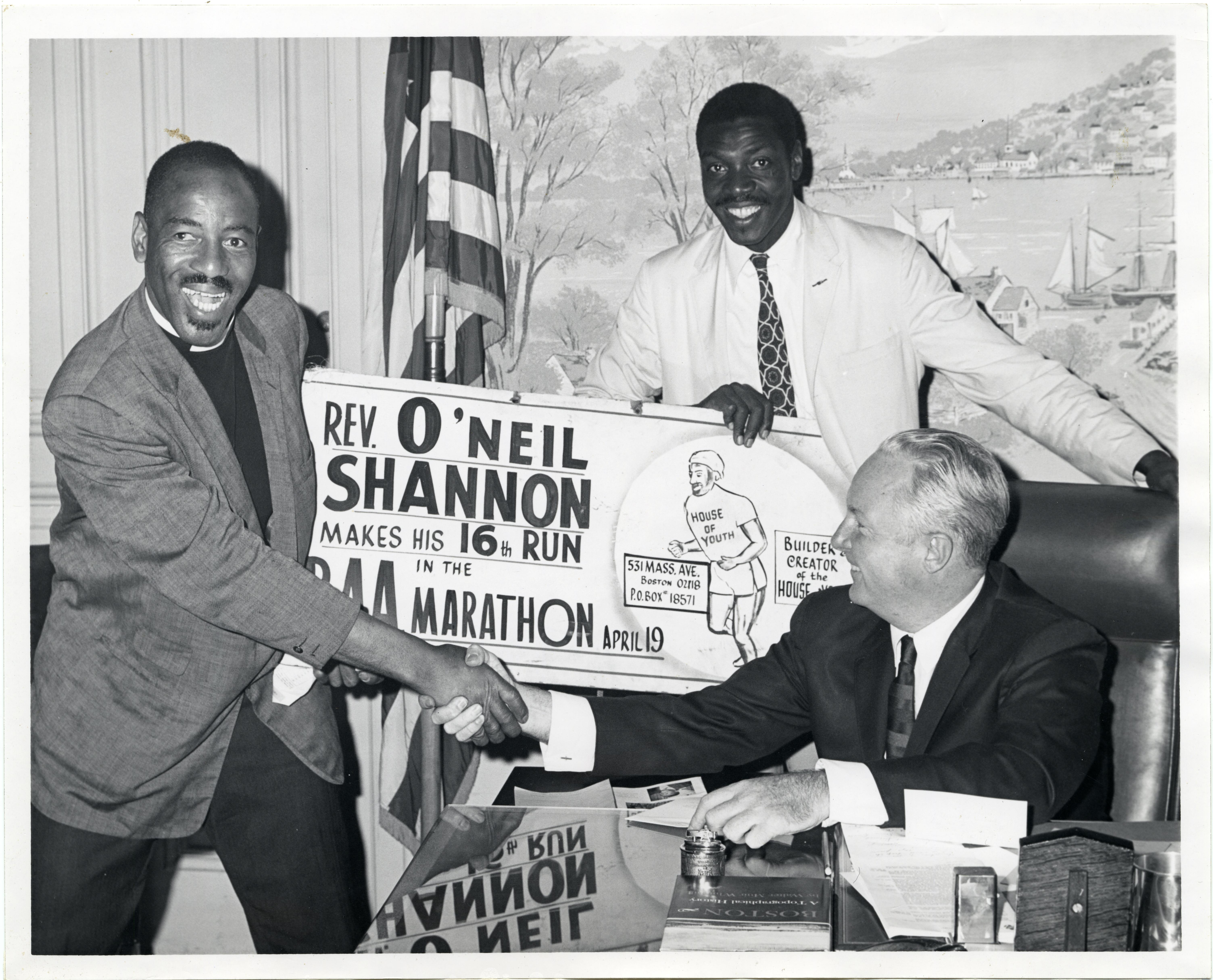
Reverend O'Neil Shannon, perennial marathon runner, calls on Mayor John F. Collins to inform him that he will be at the starting line April 19th again.

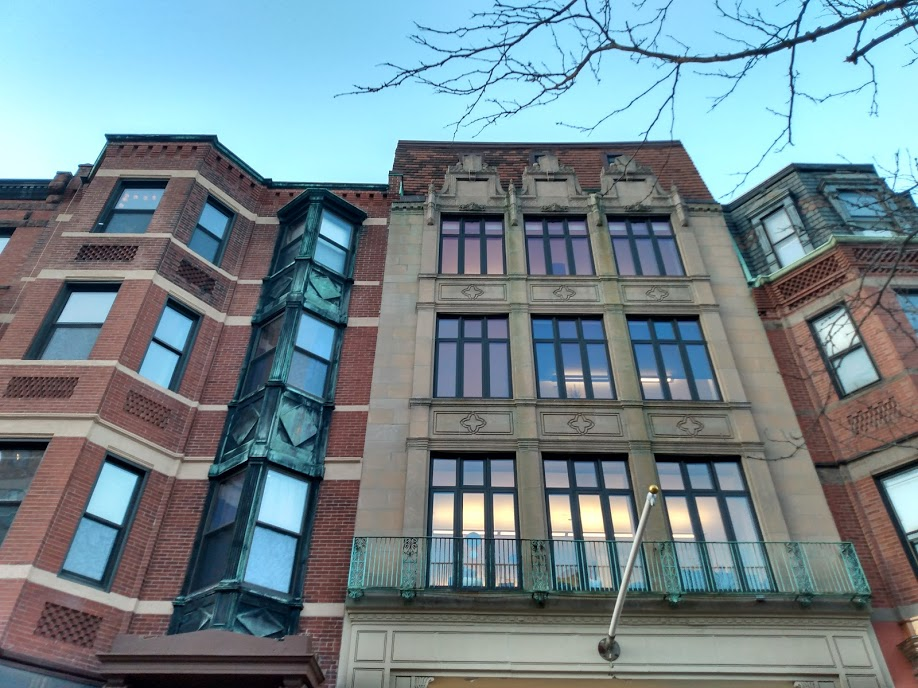
Newbury Street Back Bay

- 1966
  - Boston Phoenix newspaper begins publication.
  - Lower Roxbury Community Corporation, Haley House, and South End Historical Society established.
  - Metropolitan Council for Educational Opportunity school desegregation program begins.
  - Copley Square remodeled.
  - Paramount Hotel explosion
- 1967
  - November 7: Boston mayoral election, 1967 held.
  - Charles Cinema in business.
  - Chinese American Civic Association headquartered in city.
  - Bowker Overpass built.

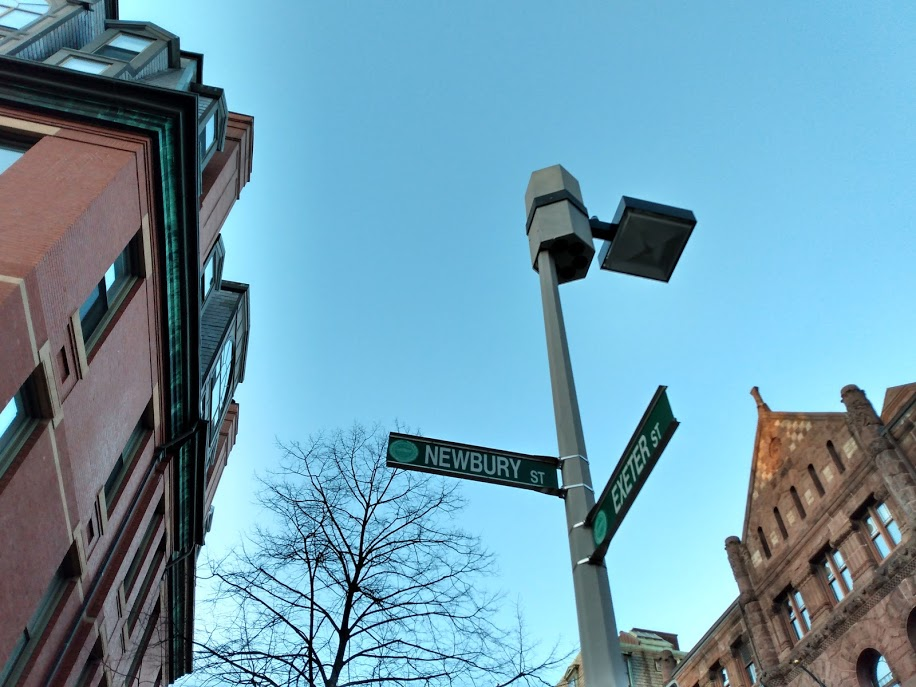
Newbury Street Back Bay at Exeter Street

- 1968
  - April 4: Racial unrest.
  - April 5: James Brown concert, Boston Garden.
  - May 2: Boston Celtics win basketball championship.
  - National Center of Afro–American Artists, Alianza Hispana, Sociedad Latina de South Boston, Community Change and city Council on Aging established.
  - Blackside films in business.
  - Kevin White becomes mayor.
- 1969
  - February: Boston City Hall new building dedicated.
  - February 24–27: Snowstorm.
  - May 5: Boston Celtics win basketball championship again.
  - Pine Street Inn homeless shelter begins operating.
  - New England Aquarium opens.
  - Walk for Hunger begins.
- 1970
  - May: Antiwar demonstration held.
  - May 10: Boston Bruins win ice hockey championship.
  - Boston Pride begins.
  - Aerosmith (musical group), Boston Center for the Arts, and city Rent Board established.
  - One Boston Place and 28 State Street built.
  - Boston Properties in business.
- 1971
  - Massachusetts Rehabilitation Hospital and Boston Food Co-op established.
  - Government Service Center built.
  - Nova Scotia's donation of the Boston Christmas Tree tradition resumes.
- 1972
  - June 17: Hotel Vendome fire.
  - Labor demonstration.
  - Maison Robert restaurant in business.
  - Boston Public Library Johnson building opens.
- 1973
  - The Boston Caribbean Carnival, is founded (same year as New York City and Washington, D.C.)
  - Bunker Hill Community College, Roxbury Community College, Boston Harbor Association, City Life/Vida Urbana, and Boston Baroque founded.
- 1974
  - Desegregation busing conflict due to outcome of verdict Morgan v. Hennigan.
  - Inquilinos Boricuas en Acción active.
  - July 4: Arthur Fiedler and the Boston Pops begin the annual tradition of a concert and fireworks show at the Hatch Shell on the Charles River Esplanade, courtesy of local businessman and philanthropist David G. Mugar.
  - The Rathskeller music venue opens.
  - Rosie's Place founded.
- 1975
  - Boston Landmarks Commission and ArtsBoston established.
  - Boston Consulting Group in business.
  - New Boston Review begins publication.
- 1976
  - John Hancock Tower built.
  - July 4: America's Bicentennial celebrations.
  - First Night begins.
  - Boston Irish News begins publication.
  - Boston Film/Video Foundation and Boston By Foot established.
  - WGBH Ten O’Clock News (local news) begins broadcasting.
  - Faneuil Hall marketplace developed.
- 1977
  - Federal Reserve Bank Building constructed.
  - Chinese Progressive Association founded.
- 1978
  - January 20–21: Snowstorm.
  - February 6–7: Snowstorm.
  - Newbury Comics in business.
  - American Buddhist Shim Gum Do Association headquartered in Brighton.
  - Boston Preservation Alliance founded.
  - L'Espalier restaurant in business.
- 1979
  - WBCN Rock & Roll Rumble begins.
  - Boston Children's Museum building and Computer Museum open.
  - John F. Kennedy Library built.
  - Center for Chinese Art and Culture, and Mission of Burma (musical group) established.
  - Brian J. Donnelly becomes U.S. representative for Massachusetts's 11th congressional district.

=== 1980s–1990s ===
- 1980
  - Boston Early Music Festival, Boston Alliance for Gay and Lesbian Youth, The History Project, and Culinary Historians of Boston founded.
  - The Channel (nightclub) opens.
  - Sister city relationship established with Barcelona, Spain.
  - Population: 562,994.
- 1981
  - Boston Society of Film Critics, Dance Umbrella, and Boston Area Feminist Coalition founded.
  - Boston Food Bank incorporated.
  - J.P. Licks in business.
  - November 6: PRISM New England is launched, becoming Boston's first regional sports and entertainment network to launch.
- 1982
  - January 23: World Airways Flight 30 is crashed as Logan International Airport, 2 people are killed, but 210 people survived.
  - Suffolk Construction Company in business.
  - Boston Gay Men's Chorus and Boston Fair Housing Commission established.
  - Sister city relationship established with Hangzhou, China.
  - Cheers fictional television program begins broadcasting.
- 1983
  - Dorchester Reporter begins publication.
  - Boston Community Access and Programming Foundation established.
  - Bayside Expo Center opens.
  - Sister city relationship established with Padua, Italy.
- 1984
  - Raymond Flynn becomes mayor.
  - Bernard Law becomes Catholic bishop of Boston.
  - Bain Capital, Trident Booksellers, and Copley Place Cinemas in business.
  - April 4: New England Sports Network is launched as Boston. becoming only the 2nd regional sports network in Boston to launch.
  - Boston Human Rights Commission, and city Office of Business and Cultural Development established.
- 1985
  - Dudley Street Neighborhood Initiative and Universal Buddhist Congregation established.
  - Lecco's Lemma hip-hop radio program begins broadcasting on WMBR.
  - Sister city relationship established with Melbourne, Australia.
  - Massachusetts State Archives moves to Columbia Point.
- 1986 – Pixies (musical group), and city Office of Arts and Humanities established.
- 1987
  - ACT UP/Boston and Jamaica Plain Historical Society founded.
  - Back Bay (MBTA station) rebuilt.
  - Partners In Health nonprofit headquartered in city.
  - Joseph P. Kennedy II becomes U.S. representative for Massachusetts's 8th congressional district.
  - Hamersley's Bistro in business.
- 1988
  - City of Boston Archives and City Year established.
  - Hynes Convention Center and 75 State Street built.
  - Aberdeen Group in business.
  - Michael Dukakis presidential campaign and Pioneer Institute headquartered in city.
  - Tent City (housing complex) dedicated.
- 1989
  - October 23: Stuart shootings in Mission Hill.
  - Biba restaurant in business.
  - Sister city relationship established with Haifa, Israel.
  - Bethel African Methodist Episcopal Church and New England Shelter for Homeless Veterans founded.
- 1990
  - March 18: Gardner Museum heist.
  - Population: 574,283.
- 1991- Deer Island Prison closes.
  - The no-name weather system on Halloween becomes known as the Perfect Storm due to how it came together.
- 1992
  - Spare Change News begins publication.
  - Ten Point Coalition founded.
  - Chinese Historical Society of New England headquartered in city.
  - Avalon nightclub opens.
- 1993
  - July 12: Thomas Menino, president of the Boston City Council, becomes acting mayor when Mayor Flynn resigns to accept his appointment by President Clinton to become Ambassador to the Holy See.
  - November 2: Menino is elected mayor in his own right.
  - Urban College of Boston established.
  - C-Mart grocery in Chinatown and Alpha Management Corp. (landlord) in business.
- 1994

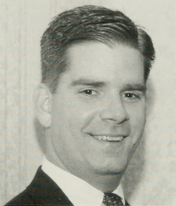
The Future Mayor Of Boston Martin Walsh during his tenure in the Massachusetts House of Representatives

Menino with Mayor Raymond Flynn during Menino's tenure as a City Councilor

  - August 15: Chinook Checkers Program wins Man vs Machine World Team Championship.
  - Alternatives for Community and Environment founded.
  - Rent control ends.
  - Harbor Lights Pavilion (amphitheatre) opens.
- 1995
  - Ted Williams Tunnel opens.
  - Piers Park Sailing Center, and city Office of Civil Rights established.
  - Stop & Shop grocery in business in Jamaica Plain.
  - Citizen Schools nonprofit headquartered in Boston.
  - Boston Fashion Week begins.
- 1996
  - City website launched.
  - The Boston City Hospital (BCH), the first municipal hospital in the United States and Boston University Medical Center Hospital (BUMCH) merge.
  - Boston Harbor Islands National Recreation Area, city Public Health Commission, and Massachusetts Interactive Media Council established.
  - Sister city relationship established with Taipei, Taiwan.
  - Massachusetts Institute for a New Commonwealth headquartered in city.
  - Boston Coalition of Black Women incorporated.
  - Operation Ceasefire implemented.
- 1997
  - April 1: Blizzard.
  - Grub Street writing center established.
  - Shaw's grocery in business in Dorchester.
  - Boston Demons begin play in inaugural USAFL season.
- 1998
  - Dudley Film Festival begins.
  - Urban Ecology Institute founded.
  - No. 9 Park restaurant in business.
  - Boston Garden is demolished.
- 1999
  - Mike Capuano becomes U.S. representative for Massachusetts's 8th congressional district.
  - John Joseph Moakley United States Courthouse built.
  - Northeastern University's Center for Urban and Regional Policy and Fidelity Center for Applied Technology established.
  - Nixon Peabody in business.
  - Sister city relationship established with Boston, England.
- 2000
  - T Rider's Union, Boston University's Center for the Study of the Longer-Range Future, and Technology Goes Home digital divide project established.
  - Population: 589,141.

== 21st century ==
=== 2000s ===
- 2001
  - Stephen Lynch becomes U.S. representative for Massachusetts's 9th congressional district.
  - Sister city relationship established with Sekondi-Takoradi, Ghana.
  - Trader Joe's grocery in business in Back Bay.
  - MassEquality headquartered in Boston.
- 2002
  - Sexual abuse scandal in the Catholic archdiocese of Boston reported.
  - Super 88 grocery in business in Allston.
  - South End Technology Center active.
- 2003
  - February 17–18: Snowstorm.
  - Leonard P. Zakim Bunker Hill Memorial Bridge opens.
  - Discover Roxbury established.
  - Independent Film Festival of Boston and Anime Boston convention begin.
  - AIDS Action Committee of Massachusetts headquartered in city.
- 2004
  - June: Boston Convention and Exhibition Center opens.
  - July: 2004 Democratic National Convention held.
  - October 27: Red Sox win World Series (for the first time since 1918).
  - Boston Social Forum held.
  - Artists for Humanity EpiCenter built.
  - Institute for Justice & Democracy in Haiti headquartered in Boston.
  - City's "Office of Arts, Tourism, and Special Events" and Boston Public Library Map Center established.
- 2005
  - January 22–23: Blizzard.
  - Boston Workers Alliance and Boston Derby Dames (rollerderby league) established.
  - Universal Hub begins publication.
  - Eastern Standard restaurant and Toro restaurant in business.
- 2006
  - July 10: Big Dig ceiling collapse.
  - August 15: Joseph E. Aoun takes office as the seventh president of Northeastern University.
  - December: Institute of Contemporary Art building opens in South Boston.
  - Crittenton Women's Union formed.
- 2007
  - Big Dig completed.
  - 826 Boston (writing center) and Berklee's Cafe 939 open.
  - Charles/MGH (MBTA station) rebuilt.
  - Myers + Chang restaurant in business.
  - Xconomy begins publication.
  - Sister city relationship established with Valladolid, Spain.
  - Grow Boston Greener established.
- 2008
  - Rose Kennedy Greenway built.
  - Open Media Boston established.
  - BostInno begins publication.
- 2009
  - Boston Book Festival and TEDx Boston begin.
  - GlobalPost news headquartered in Boston.
  - Boston Street Lab incorporated.
  - City government "Citizens Connect" 3-1-1 app launched.
  - Higher Ground Boston, and Bocoup Loft, Boston World Partnerships nonprofit, and Boston University's New England Center for Investigative Reporting established.
  - Islamic Society of Boston Cultural Center opens in Roxbury.
  - August 29: Funeral and procession for longtime US Senator Edward M. Kennedy.

=== 2010s ===
- 2010
  - One City One Story, Boston Rising program in Grove Hall, Girls Rock Boston, JP Music Festival, and Design Museum Boston established.
  - MuckRock headquartered in Boston.
  - Island Creek Oyster Bar in business.
  - Population: 617,594; metro 4,552,402.
- 2011
  - September 30: Occupy Boston begins.
  - Hubway (bike system) and Future Boston Alliance established.
  - Boston Urban Iditarod begins.
  - Population: 625,087; metro 4,591,112.
- 2012
  - October: Hurricane Sandy.
  - Data.cityofboston.gov website launched.
  - Mitt Romney presidential campaign, 2012 headquartered in Boston.
  - Boston Contemporary Dance Festival begins.
  - Population: 636,479.
- 2013
  - February 8–9: Blizzard.
  - April 15: Boston Marathon bombing.
  - April 19: City shuts down for manhunt of marathon bombing suspect Dzhokhar Tsarnaev. His brother Tamerlan died in a shootout with Watertown Police three after the tragedy. Towards the end of the manhunt, Dzhokhar was found hidden in a boat in a Watertown backyard. He was surrounded by police and was later taken into custody.
  - June 12: Whitey Bulger trial begins.
  - October 30: The Boston Red Sox, in an end-of-year triumph, win the 2013 World Series against the St. Louis Cardinals; the first win at Fenway Park since 1918, and the third they've won since 2004.
  - November 5: Boston mayoral election, 2013.
  - Millennium Tower construction begins.
  - Digital Public Library of America headquartered in Boston.
  - Code for Boston active.
  - Longfellow Bridge renovation begins.

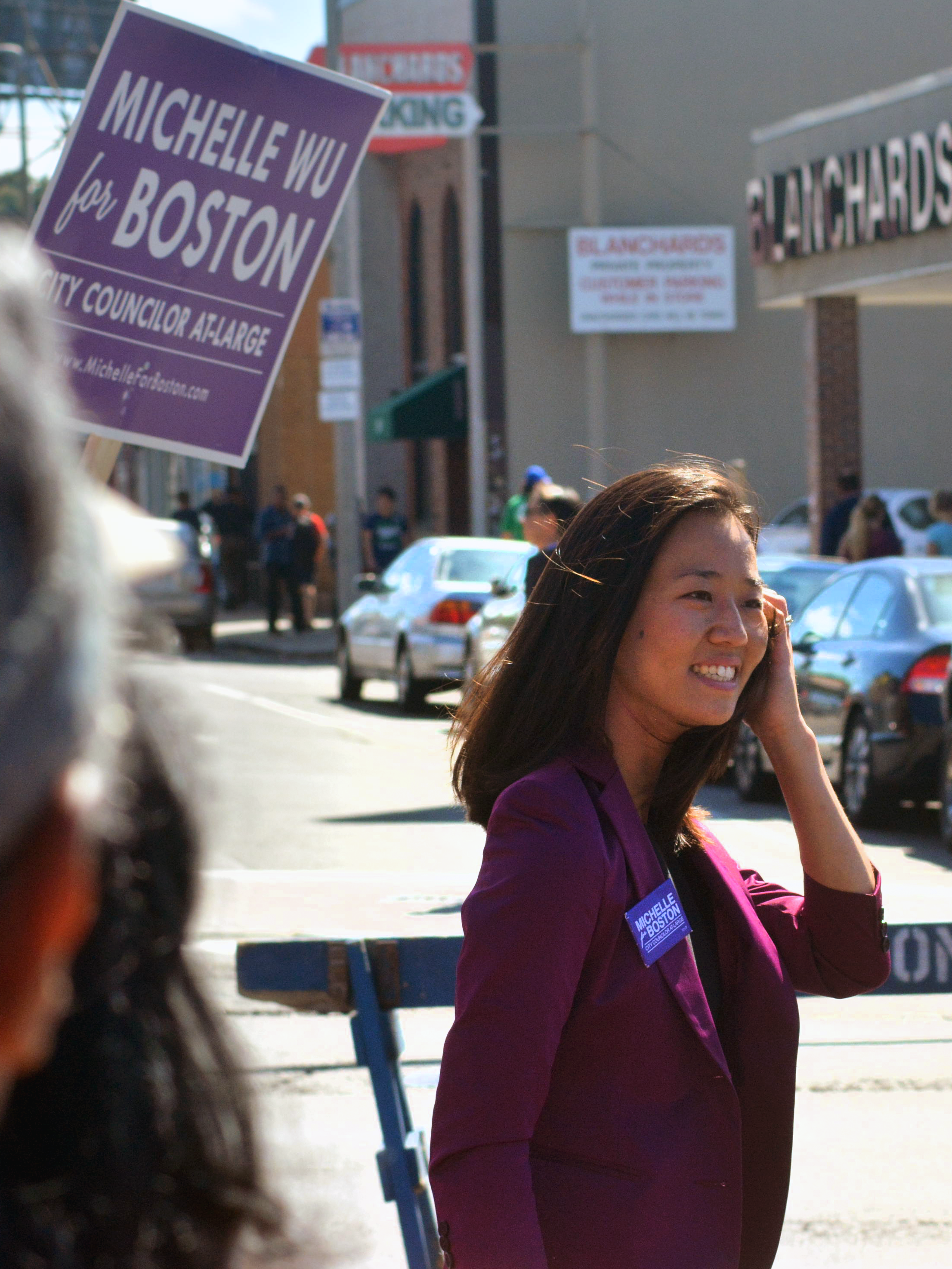
Wu campaigning for Boston City Council in 2013

  - November 14: Bulger was sentenced to two consecutive life terms plus five years for his crimes by U.S. District Judge Denise Casper. As of January 10, 2014 Bulger is currently incarcerated at the United States Penitentiary in Tucson, Arizona .
- 2014
  - Marty Walsh becomes mayor.
  - Boston Veterans Treatment Court begins operating.
  - April: City government open data executive order signed.
  - November 3: Funeral and procession for former mayor Tom Menino, after he lay in state at Faneuil Hall the previous day.
  - December: Boston bid for the 2024 Summer Olympics submitted.
  - TD Garden, the home of the Boston Bruins and Boston Celtics, will receive a $70 million facelift over the next two years.

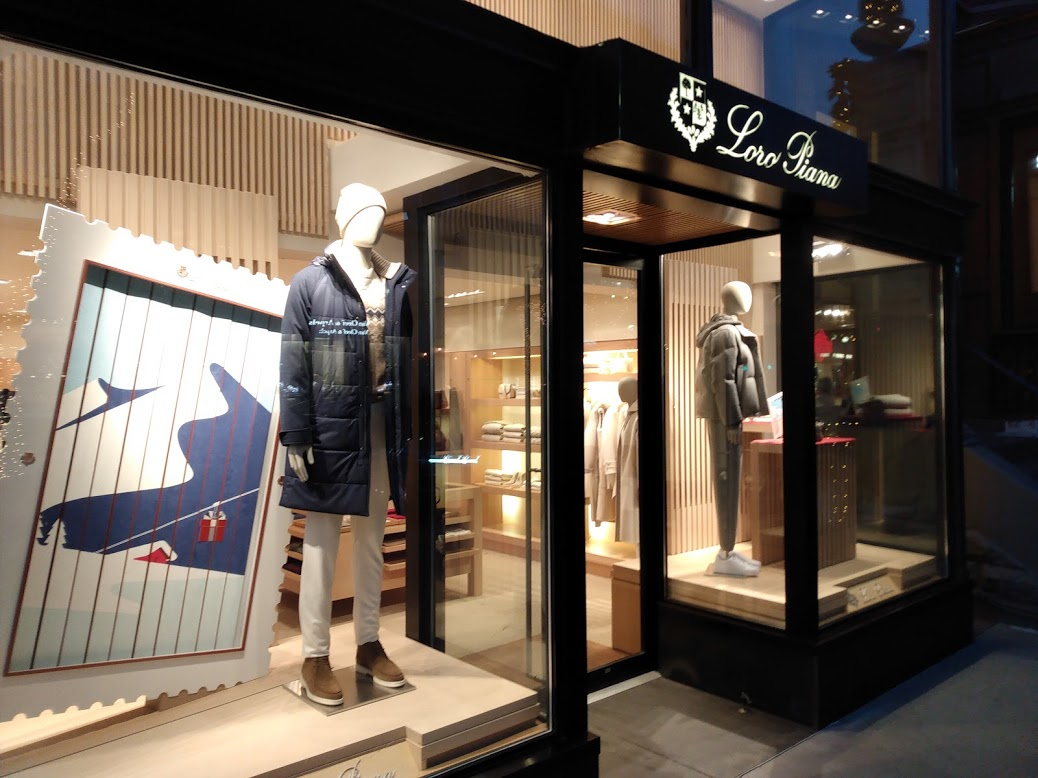
Boston Back Bay - Newbury Street

- 2015
  - January 5: The trial of Dzhokhar Tsarnaev begins.
  - January 26–27: January 2015 North American blizzard.
  - March: After closure in 2014 the rebuilt Government Center MBTA station reopens.
  - March–April: what remained of Long Island Bridge in Boston Harbor is demolished after having been formally closed a year earlier in 2014.
  - May: United Women's Lacrosse League is founded.
  - June: Kimono protest begins.
  - July 14: Tide Street snow pile melts.
  - City 15-year master plan process begins.
  - Kennedy Institute for the United States Senate opens.
  - Daily Table grocery and Boston Market in business.
  - Sunfish spotted in harbour.
  - Tower at One Greenway built.
  - One Dalton construction begins.
- 2016 – February 23: Boston Storm (UWLX) is founded as one of the four original teams in the United Women's Lacrosse League.
  - October: An unusually high 'King Tide' over-tops part of Long Wharf along the Boston waterfront.
- 2017
  - January 21: Women's protest against U.S. president Trump.
  - April 3: Interdisciplinary Science and Engineering Complex at Northeastern University opens for collaborative research, laboratory access, and classroom learning.
  - August 18: Thousands march from Roxbury to Boston Common to protest white nationalism a week after violence in Charlottesville, Virginia. They protest a gathering of a hundred self-identified free speech advocates associated with the alt-right.
  - August, 20: the .boston top-level internet domain (GeoTLD) officially started taking registrations.
- 2019
  - Long-time Dudley Square is officially renamed Nubian Square.

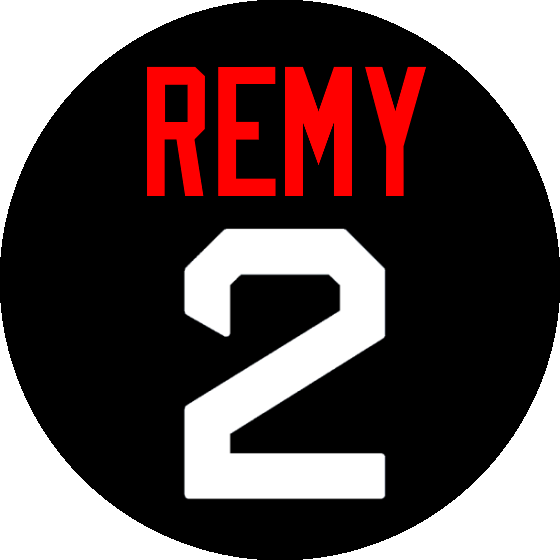
The Red Sox team wore a commemorative patch to honor Jerry Remy during the 2022 season.

=== 2020s ===
- 2020
  - March: Boston was hardest-hit by COVID-19 pandemic, Mayor Marty Walsh declares state of emergency, which put few thousands of residents out of work, issued strict local stay-at-home orders, and shifted others to work at home.
- 2021
  - July 3: Wakefield standoff: an armed standoff occurs between a sovereign citizen movement militia group and Massachusetts State Police along a stretch of I-95 in Wakefield about 11 miles (18 km) north of Downtown Boston.
  - November 2: Michelle Wu, a 36-year-old daughter of Taiwanese immigrants, is the first female to be elected Mayor of Boston.

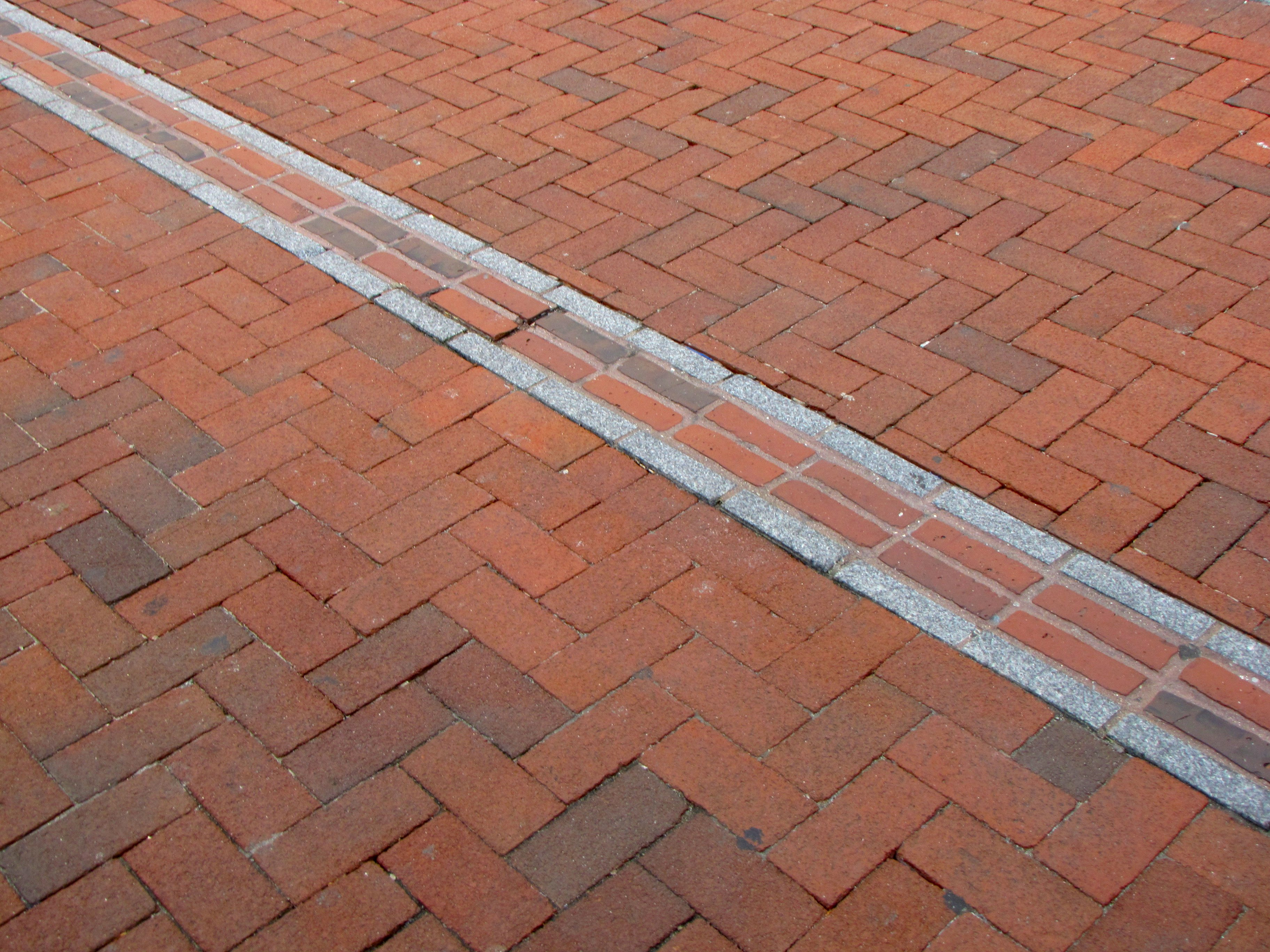
Freedom Trail marker through a red brick sidewalk

- 2022
  - A New Holocaust museum and education center To be located on the Freedom Trail that marks the history of the United States. Marked largely with brick, it winds from Boston Common in downtown Boston through the North End to the Bunker Hill Monument in Charlestown. In 2022 a Holocaust museum was slated and design, along with plenty of funding and this will be designed along the Freedom Trail at the Boston Common within view of the Massachusetts State House on Beacon Hill.
- 2023
  - Boston unveiled The Embrace, a large bronze sculpture on Boston Common honoring Dr. Martin Luther King Jr. and Coretta Scott King.

== See also ==
- Annual events in Boston
- History of Boston
- List of mayors of Boston
- Past Members of the Boston City Council
- Timelines of other municipalities in the Greater Boston area of Massachusetts: Cambridge, Haverhill, Lawrence, Lowell, Lynn, New Bedford, Salem, Somerville, Waltham, Worcester
- Timeline of Holyoke, Massachusetts

== Bibliography ==
published in the 19th century

- Boston Almanac, 1838
- Abel Bowen (1838), Bowen's Picture of Boston (3rd ed.), Boston: Otis, Broaders and Company, OCLC 5204074, OL 6905756M
- Alden Bradford (1843). New England Chronology. Boston: S.G. Simpkins.
- William Henry Overall, ed. (1870), "Boston", Dictionary of Chronology, London: William Tegg, OCLC 2613202
- Celebration of the Two Hundred and Fiftieth Anniversary of the Settlement of Boston, September 17, 1880. City Council. 1880.
- Moses King (1880). Back-Bay District and the Vendôme. Boston.
- Justin Winsor, ed. (1881), Memorial History of Boston, vol. 4, Boston: Ticknor and Company, OCLC 1838124, OL 24155402M
- Story of the Irish in Boston. James B. Cullen & Co. 1889.

published in the 20th century

- Edwin M. Bacon (1903). Boston: a Guide Book. Boston: Ginn & Co.
- City of Boston, Engineering Department (1903). List of Maps of Boston Published Between 1600 and 1903. Municipal Printing Office.
- Benjamin Vincent (1910), "Boston", Haydn's Dictionary of Dates (25th ed.), London: Ward, Lock & Co.
- Chronology of the Boston Public Schools, City of Boston, 1912, OL 7071642M
- Directory of the Charitable and Beneficent Organizations of Boston (6th ed.), Boston: Old Corner Bookstore, Inc., 1914
- Federal Writers' Project (1937), Massachusetts: a Guide to its Places and People, American Guide Series, Cambridge: Riverside Press "Boston"; "Chronology"
- Carl Bridenbaugh (1971), Cities in Revolt: Urban Life in America, 1743–1776, London: Oxford University Press, OL 16383796M
- George J. Lankevich (1974), Howard B. Furer (ed.), Boston: a Chronological & Documentary History, 1602–1970, American Cities Chronology Series, Dobbs Ferry, N.Y.: Oceana Publications, ISBN 0379006197
- Thomas H. O'Connor (1984), Fitzpatrick's Boston, 1846–1866, Northeastern University Press, OL 1880066W
- J. Anthony Lukas (1985). Common Ground: A Turbulent Decade in the Lives of Three American Families. Vintage Books. ISBN 978-0-394-74616-6.
- Oscar Handlin (1991), Boston's Immigrants, 1790–1880, Harvard University Press, OL 15841847W
- Jack Beatty (1992), Rascal King: the Life and Times of James Michael Curley, 1874–1958, Addison-Wesley, OL 1708166M
- Adelaide M. Cromwell (1994), The Other Brahmins: Boston's Black Upper Class, 1750–1950, University of Arkansas Press, OL 1430545M
- Thomas H. O'Connor (1995). Building a New Boston: Politics and Urban Renewal, 1950–1970. University Press of New England. OL 1737146M.
- Anthony Appiah and Henry Louis Gates, ed. (1999), "Boston", Africana: the Encyclopedia of the African and African American Experience, New York: Basic Civitas Books, p. 286+, OL 43540M

published in the 21st century

- Walter Muir Whitehill (2000), Boston: a Topographical History (3rd ed.), Belknap Press of Harvard University Press, OL 58903M
- Boston City Council (2007), D. Paul Koch, Jr. (ed.), Boston City Charter (PDF)
- Stephen Puleo (2007). Boston Italians. Boston: Beacon Press. ISBN 978-0-8070-5036-1.
- Neil Miller (2010), Banned in Boston: the Watch and Ward Society's Crusade Against Books, Burlesque, and the Social Evil, Boston: Beacon Press, ISBN 9780807051122
- "Boston's 10 biggest snowstorms", Boston Globe, February 9, 2013, archived from the original on May 29, 2013
- Grocery Stores in Boston, Boston Redevelopment Authority, September 2013
- Nathaniel Philbrick (2013). Bunker Hill: A City, A Siege, A Revolution. Penguin. ISBN 978-1-101-62270-4.
- "Four centuries of Boston flops, flubs, and failures", Boston Globe, July 26, 2016
- "Boston, MA". U.S. City Open Data Census. Sunlight Foundation and Open Knowledge International. 2018. Archived from the original on November 18, 2018.
- "Boston's history (all of it, in chronological order) needs a home", Boston Globe, April 24, 2018
