= Boston Watch =

Precursor to the Boston Police Department

The Boston Watch, established in 1631, was the precursor to the Boston Police Department.

== History ==
In 1631, Boston was a tiny Puritan settlement with approximately 175 residents. A watch was established on April 14 to patrol Boston Neck after sunset. Settler John Winthrop wrote in his journal at the time, "We began a court of guard upon the neck between Roxbury and Boston, whereupon should be always resident an officer and six men." It was agreed that "if any person fire off a piece after the watch is set, he shall be fined forty shillings, or be whipped."

By 1634, the population had grown to about 400. In September, the town government was organized, consisting of nine selectmen and several other officers. William Chesebrough was elected Constable. The following May, the Boston Gaol was built on Prison Lane (now Court Street). The original building was made of wood, with barred windows. It is imaginatively described in the first chapter of The Scarlet Letter by Nathaniel Hawthorne.

The Town Meeting assumed control of the Boston Watch in 1636. Initially the watchmen's duties were limited to patrolling the town at night to guard against criminals, wild animals, and fire. As the town grew, so did their responsibilities. In the early 1840s, the City of Boston established a police force of six men under the supervision of a City Marshall. The Boston Watch, which by now had grown to 120 men, continued to operate separately until 1854, when they were replaced by the Boston Police Department.

== See also ==
- History of Boston
- Timeline of Boston

== Bibliography ==
- Hawthorne, Nathaniel (1850). The Scarlet Letter. Boston: Ticknor, Reed, and Fields. p. 55.
- Savage, Edward Hartwell (1865). A Chronological History of the Boston Watch and Police: From 1631 to 1865. Boston: The Author. p. 11.
- Vrabel, Jim (2004). When in Boston: A Time Line & Almanac. Boston: Northeastern University Press. ISBN 1-55553-620-4.
- Winthrop, John (1908) [1631]. Hosner, James Kendall (ed.). Winthrop's Journal, "History of New England," 1630-1649, Volume 7, Issue 1. New York: C. Scribner's Sons.
