= Gertrude Beals Bourne =

American artist

- Born: 1868; Boston, Massachusetts
- Died: 1962 (aged 93–94); Boston, Massachusetts

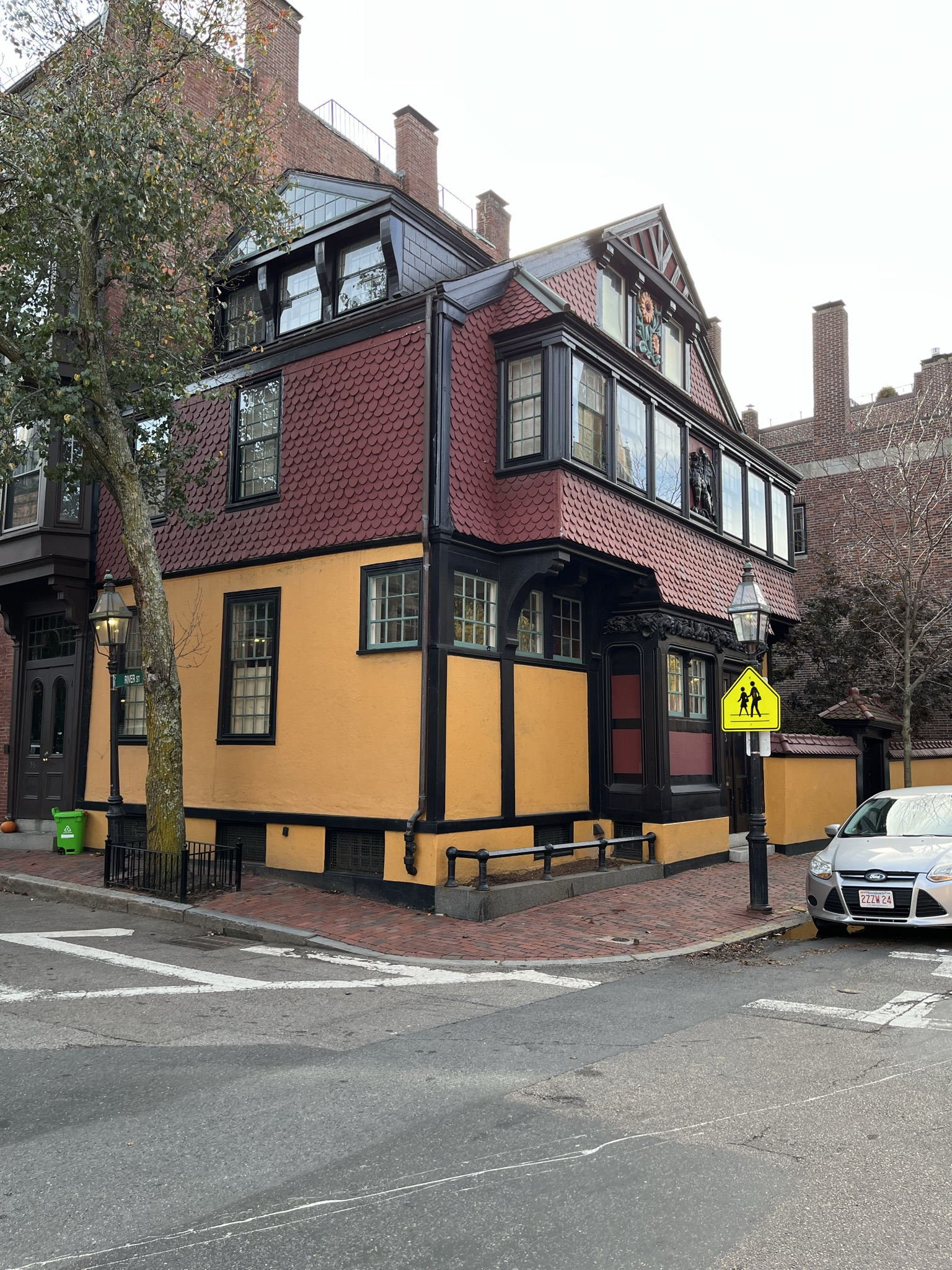
Sunflower Castle, in Beacon Hill, Bourne's former home

Gertrude Beals Bourne (1868–1962) was an American artist.

Bourne was known as a landscape painter and for her gardening work; she was the founder Boston's Beacon Hill Garden Club. She studied art privately beginning about 1890, first with Henry Rice and then with Henry B. Snell, a founding member of the New York Watercolor Club. She preferred to paint in Gouche and watercolor. In 1904 she married the architect Frank Bourne. They lived together in a home known as Sunflower Castle, in Boston's Beacon Hill neighborhood.

The 2004 book Gertrude Beals Bourne: Artist in Brahmin Boston (1868-1962) is devoted to her work.

== Collections ==
Her work is included in the collections of the Museum of Fine Arts, Boston and the Smithsonian American Art Museum.
