= New Riding Club =

- U.S. National Register of Historic Places
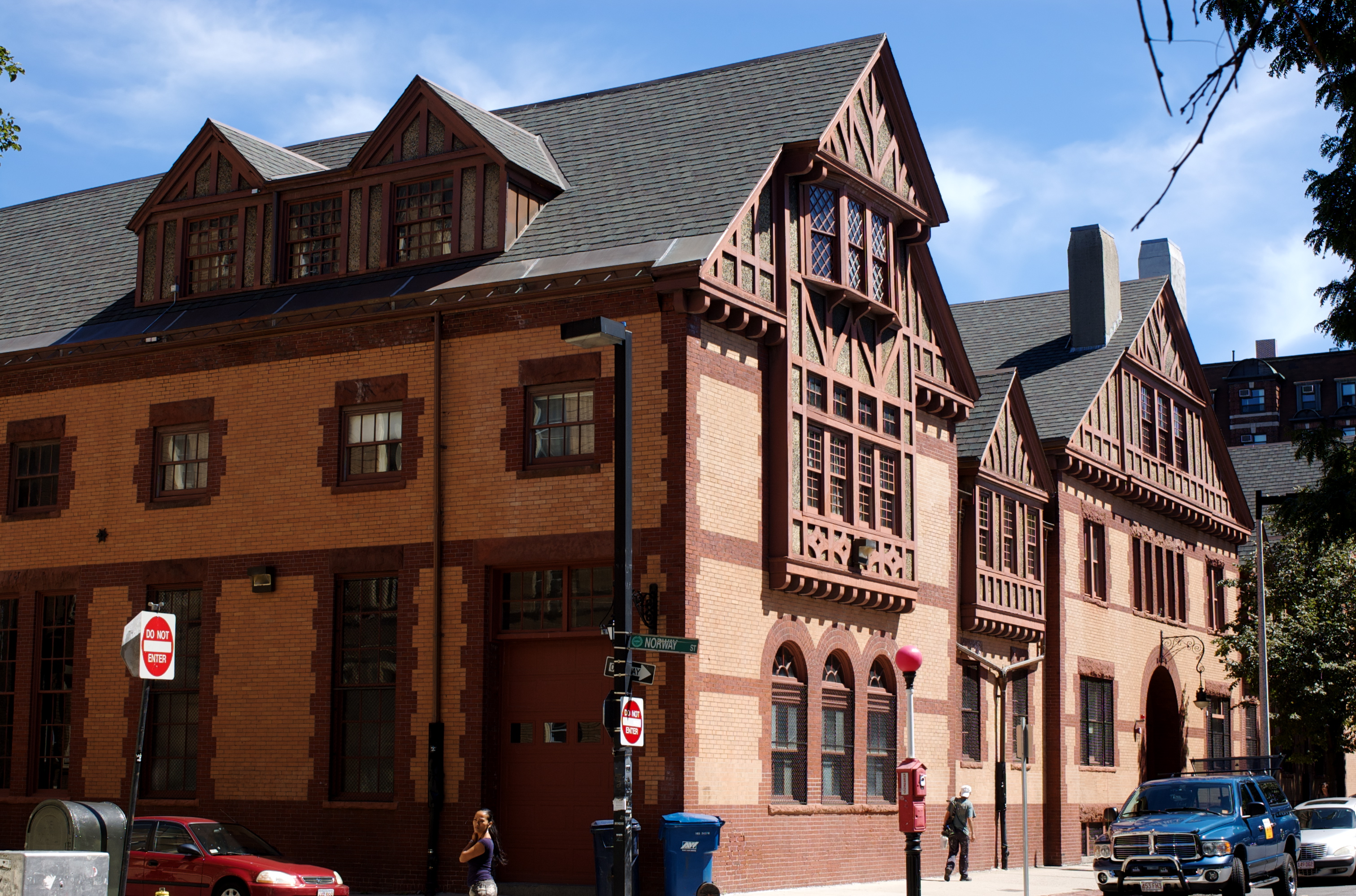

- Location within Massachusetts Location within the United States
- Location: Boston, Massachusetts
- Coordinates: 42°20′42.2″N 71°5′21.3″W
- Built: 1891
- Architect: Willard T. Sears
- Architectural style: Tudor Revival, Queen Anne
- NRHP reference No.: 87001394
- Added to NRHP: August 20, 1987

The New Riding Club is an historic building at 52 Hemenway Street in Boston, Massachusetts. Built in 1891 and designed by Willard T. Sears, The Riding Club is an example of Tudor Revival architecture. The building was added to the National Register of Historic Places in 1987. It is the only building remaining of three such facilities built in the neighborhood near the end of the 19th century.

The club was formed by prominent Bostonians whose Back Bay neighborhood largely restricted the stabling of horses and their building's location was chosen to allow riders to use the nearby bridle paths of Frederick Law Olmsted's Back Bay Fens. It contained a riding ring, changing rooms and lounges, and spaces dedicated to stabling, grooming, shoeing, and exercising horses. The former French cavalry officer Henry Lucien de Bussigny, the author of several works on horsemanship, was the riding instructor.

The building was acquired by the Badminton and Tennis Club in 1934, and the interior riding ring was converted to tennis courts. In 1985 the remaining stables were converted to residential apartments.

== See also ==
- National Register of Historic Places listings in southern Boston, Massachusetts
