= St. Stephen's Armenian Apostolic Church =

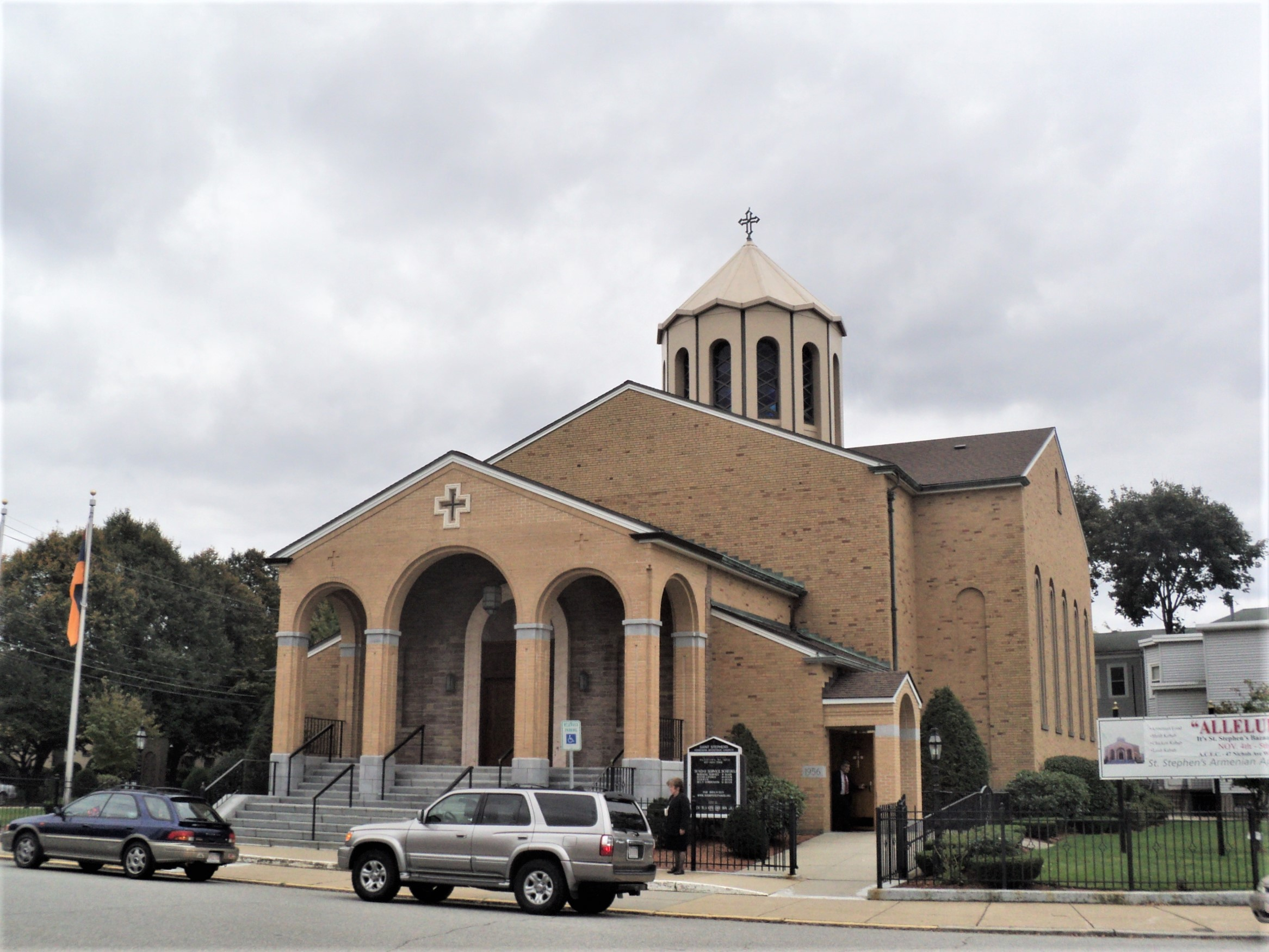
- St. Stephen's Armenian Apostolic Church
- 42.369361°N 71.158028°W
- Location: Watertown, Massachusetts
- Country: United States
- Denomination: Armenian Apostolic Church
- Website: www.soorpstepanos.org

History
- Dedication: Saint Stephen
- Dedicated: October 20, 1957

Architecture
- Architectural type: Armenian
- Groundbreaking: 1956

Administration
- Diocese: Diocese of the Armenian Church of America (Eastern)

Clergy
- Pastor: Archpriest Father Antranig Baljian

St. Stephen's Armenian Apostolic Church (Armenian: Սուրբ Ստեփանոս Հայաստանեայց Առաքելական Եկեղեցի), also known as Soorp Stepanos Church, is an Armenian Apostolic church in Watertown, Massachusetts.

The church is located in the heart of Watertown's Armenian community, the largest on the East Coast of the United States. Its jurisdiction falls under the Armenian Prelacy of the Eastern United States, based in New York City, and the Holy See of Cilicia (Lebanon).

The community was established in 1933, meeting in a rented church in Boston, but when the owners of the building decided to sell it, committees were established to seek out new facilities. On April 23, 1953 the church purchased two plots of land on Elton Avenue in Watertown on which to erect a new church. Groundbreaking took place on June 6, 1956, and the new church was consecrated on October 20, 1957 by Archbishop (Later Catholicos) Khoren I Paroian.

Adjacent to the church is a bilingual school, St. Stephen's Armenian Elementary School.

The church has faced tensions during the 2023 Azerbaijani offensive in Nagorno-Karabakh.

== Gallery ==
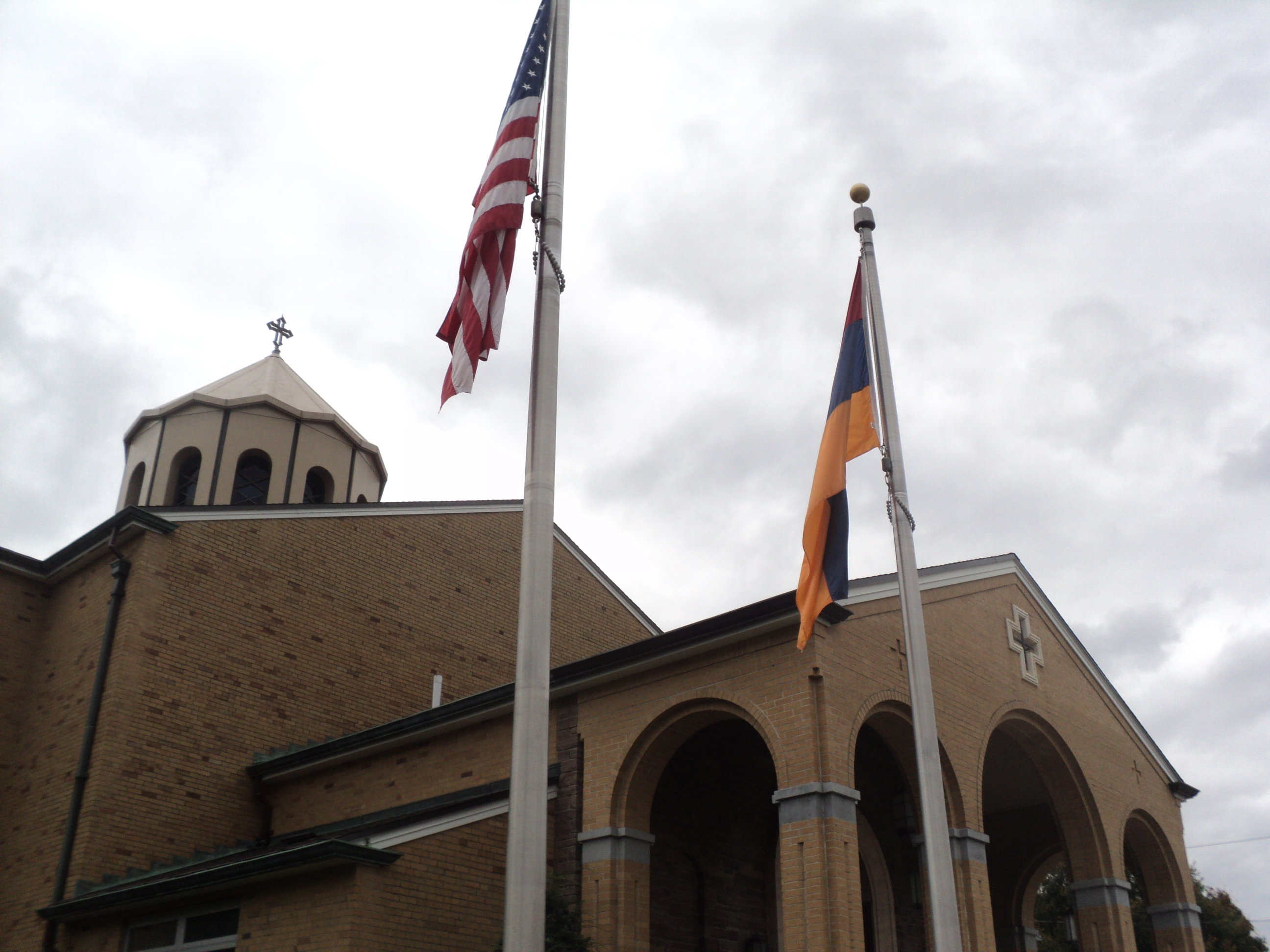

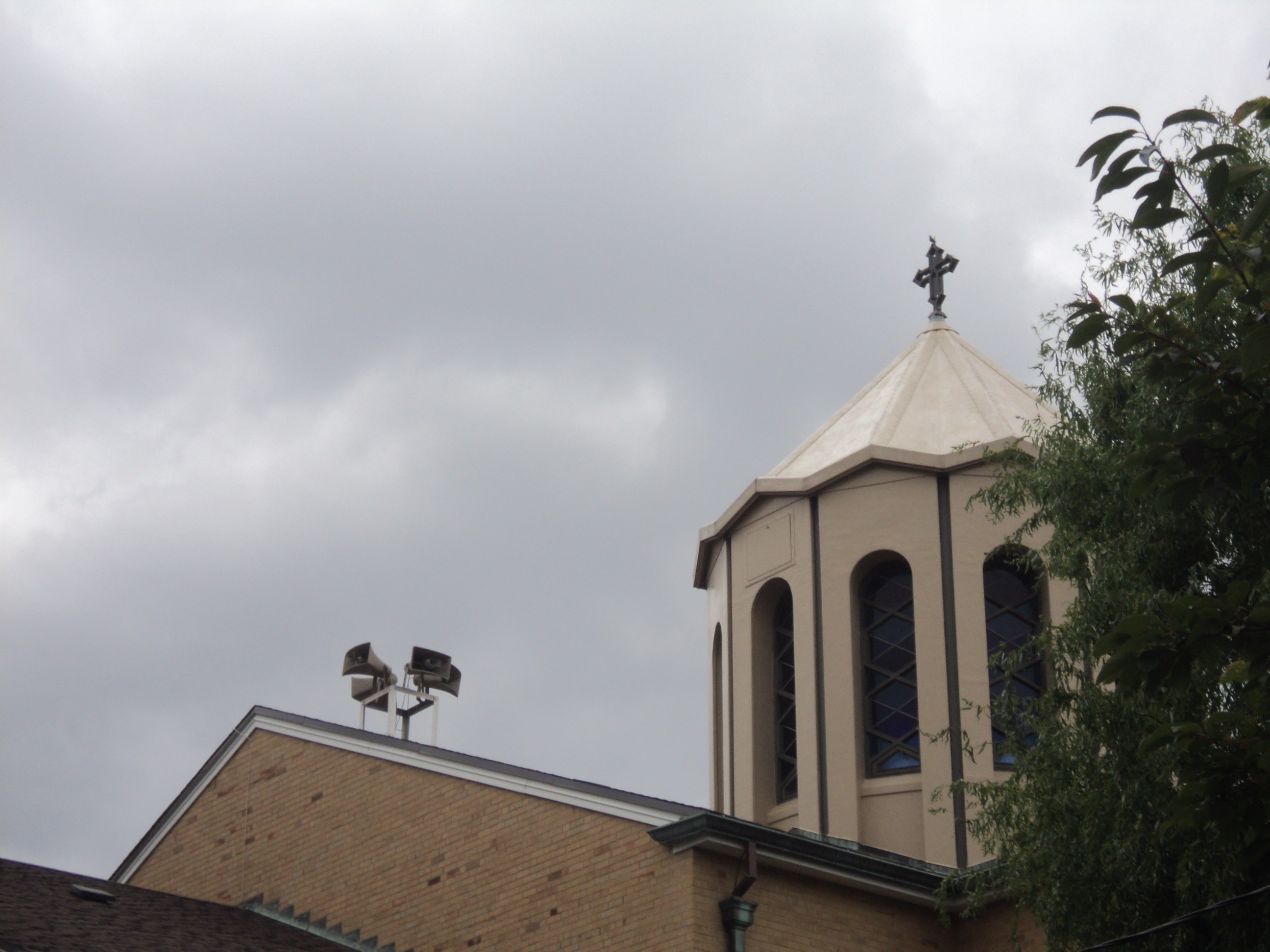

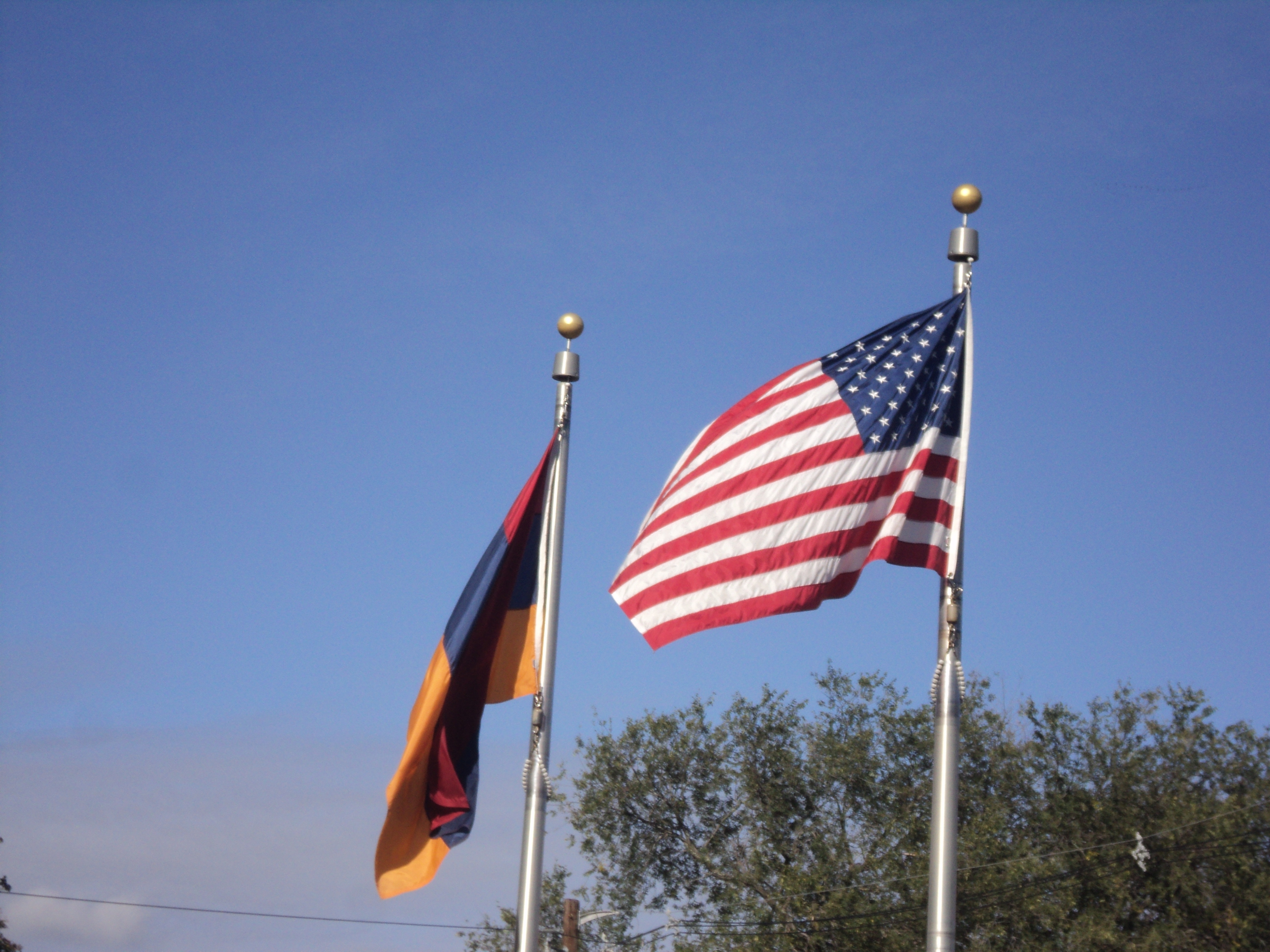
The Armenian and American flags in front of the church

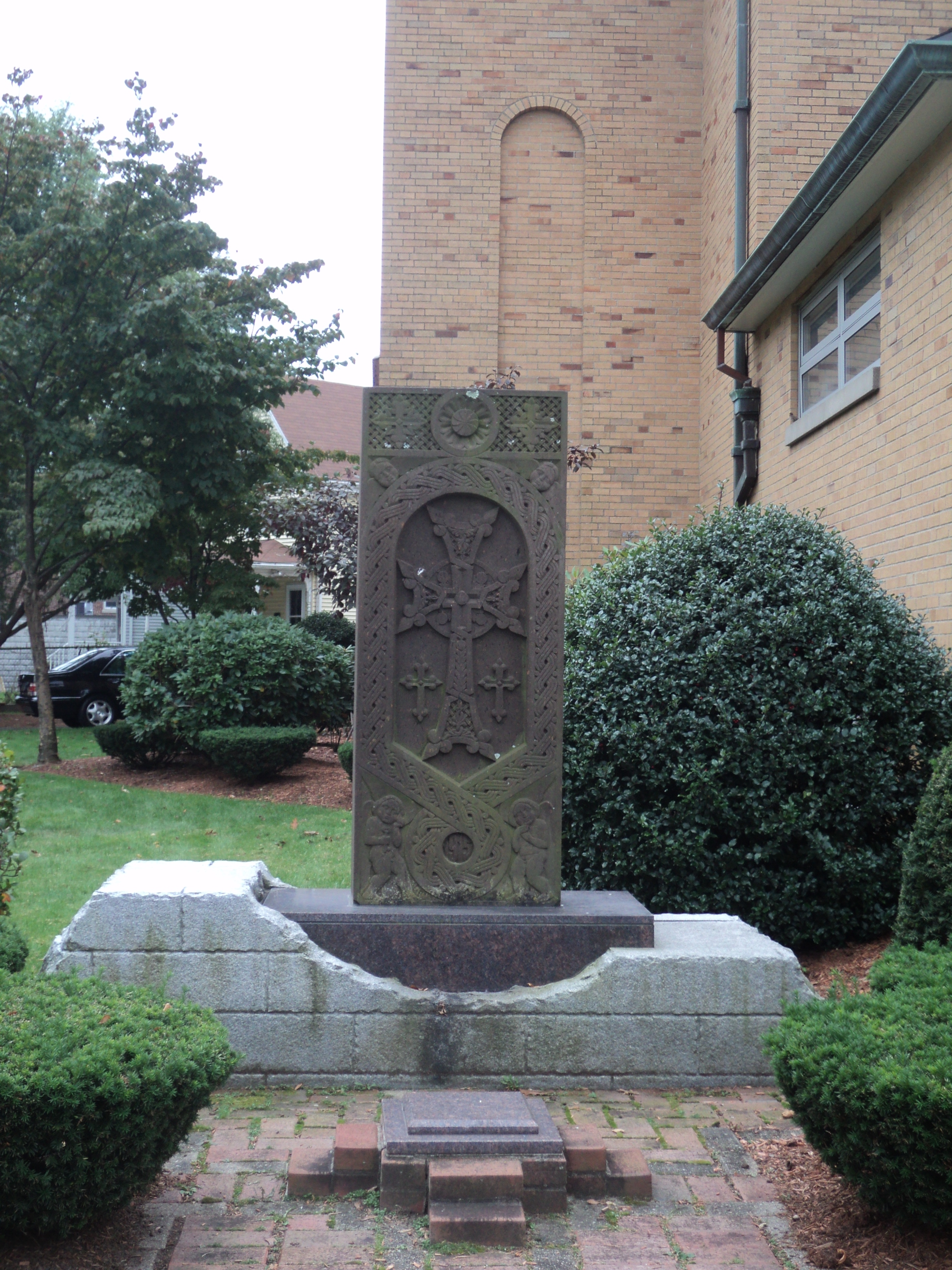
Khachkar (cross stone) in the church yard, dedicated to the victims of the Armenian genocide
