= Boston Workers Alliance =

The Boston Workers Alliance (est. 2005) of Boston, Massachusetts, is a "community organization led by unemployed and underemployed workers fighting for employment rights." Based in Boston's low-income neighborhood of Grove Hall, Roxbury, it acts as an unemployed-workers' union, providing direct services, incubating new businesses and leading organizing campaigns led by its membership.

== CORI ==
The alliance is notable for its central role in helping to pass in 2010 comprehensive state reforms to Massachusetts' criminal record system, known as the CORI. The BWA helped lead the statewide CORI reform campaign for over 5 years, asserting that unchecked criminal record discrimination in employment and housing was unfair and had negative economic and public safety consequences for the state. BWA helped raise the CORI issue into the political spotlight in 2007 after leading a major public march from Roxbury to the State House for "Jobs and CORI Reform." The BWA, along with EPOCA, Neighbor to Neighbor, and Union of Minority Neighborhoods have been credited for helping to pass the landmark legislation, which includes "Banning the Box," referring to a policy that removed the criminal record question from all initial employment forms.

== Boston Staffing Alliance ==
The BWA is also notable for its incubation of the Boston Staffing Alliance, Massachusetts' first social purpose temp agency. The Boston Staffing Alliance matches BWA members into temporary, temp-to-perm and direct placement positions with socially responsible employers that have interest in hiring through a non-profit agency. The BSA provides ongoing support to its workers to ensure employer satisfaction and employee development and growth.

== Voter engagement campaigning ==
The Boston Workers Alliance also leads a voter engagement campaign in the predominantly African American Grove Hall neighborhood as part of the Civic Engagement Initiative. The BWA reportedly knocked on over 4,000 doors and spoke to 2,000 voters to increase voter turnout in the 2010 gubernatorial election.
