= New England Manufacturers' and Mechanics' Institute =

Coordinates: 42.3394°N 71.0897°W

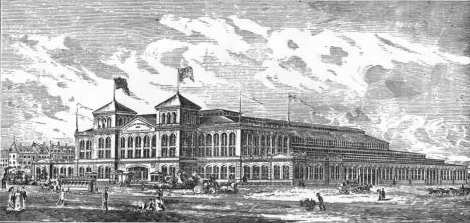
The New England Manufacturers' and Mechanics' Institute exhibition building, corner of Huntington Avenue and Rogers Avenue, Boston, 1883

The New England Manufacturers' and Mechanics' Institute (established in 1879) flourished in the 1880s in Boston, Massachusetts. It existed as a rival to the long-established Massachusetts Charitable Mechanic Association. Individuals affiliated with the NEM and M Institute included businessman John F. Wood, James L. Little, John M. Little, Samuel R. Payson, William B. Merrill, and Frederick W. Griffin.

== History ==
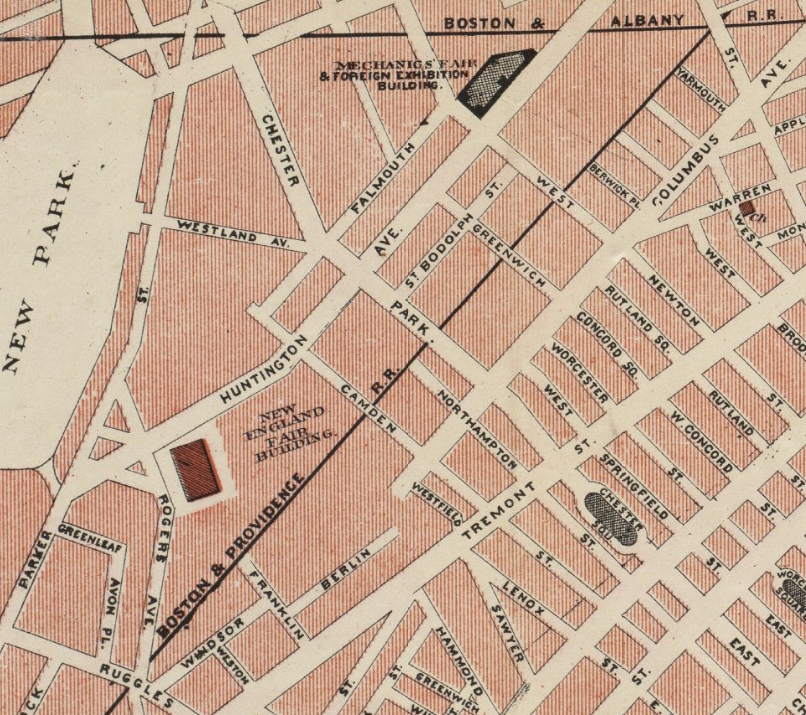
Detail of 1883 map of Boston, showing the "Mechanics Fair & Foreign Exhibition Building" (corner West Newton and Huntington) and the "New England Fair Building" (corner Rogers and Huntington)

According to the organization's own institutional history, before 1879, "the only industrial exhibitions at Boston were organised under the auspices of an association formed with an ulterior purpose. Nor were these held in permanent structures or with regular intervals. ... At the last exhibition held in a temporary structure -— that of 1878 -— it became evident that a permanent organisation and a building were needed, as over three-fifths of those wishing to exhibit could not be accommodated because of lack of space." In response, the NEM & M Institute incorporated in 1879 "for the purpose of the general improvement of the manufacturing and mechanical interests of New England; to provide means by which worthy and adequate exhibitions of manufactures and other productions can be given, and cognate objects; to obtain and distribute information relative to export business; to create and regulate methods of industrial education; to improve the technical knowledge of the members of the society by libraries, technical lectures and discussions."

=== New England Fair ===
The organization built a large exhibition hall in the Back Bay neighborhood (at Huntington Avenue and Rogers Avenue), very close to the MCMA's Mechanics Hall. The New England Fair building "covered an area of nearly five acres of land. Its available floor space for exposition purposes exceeded eight acres." Its footprint measured some 213,000 square feet (19,800 m^{2}), and the grand hall some 130,000 square feet (12,000 m^{2}). Comparatively, the Mechanics' Hall's footprint measured only 90,000 square feet.

Exhibitions were held annually. In 1881, "Governor Long [opened] the exhibition, and the Hon. George B. Loring, United States commissioner of agriculture, [delivered] an oration. The governors, the U.S. senators and representatives in congress, and the mayors of all the cities of New England" were invited. "During the winter seasons [the New England Fair building] was utilized as a skating rink, and pedestrian, bicycle, and other contests were held there."

In 1885 the exhibition building was sold to the Metropolitan Horse Railroad, for use as "a storage and repair shop." The building burnt to the ground in June 1886, in a massive fire that killed 8 people.
