= Beacon Hill Garden Club =

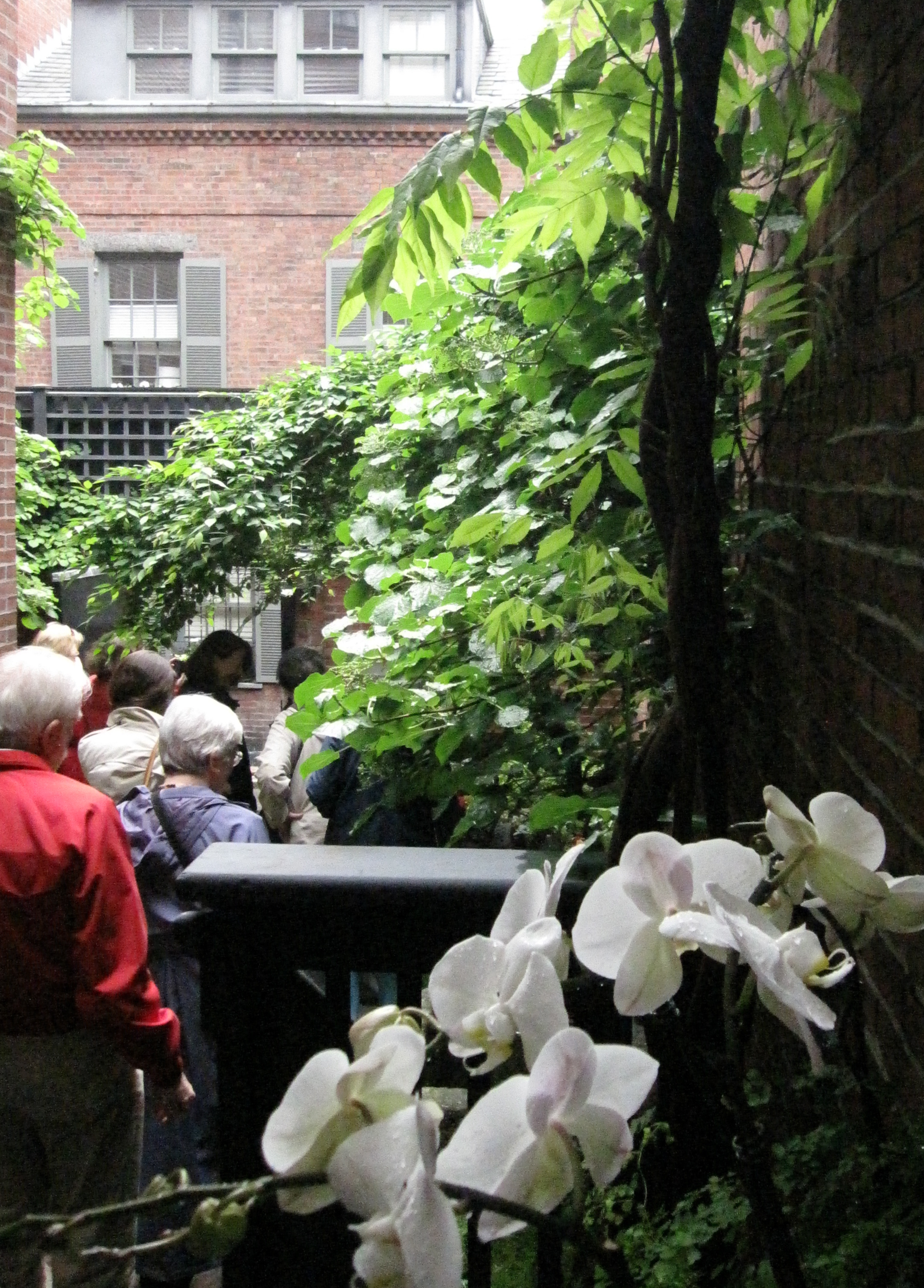
Hidden Gardens tour, Boston, May 2011

The Beacon Hill Garden Club (est. 1928) of Boston, Massachusetts, is a private civic group devoted to green spaces and urban beautification in the neighborhood of Beacon Hill and elsewhere in the city. Founders of the club include artist Gertrude Beals Bourne. As of 2011, it aims to encourage "the love of horticulture and urban gardening" and to support "environmental conservation and civic improvement."

Since 1929, the club has organized an annual behind-the-scenes tour of selected private gardens in Beacon Hill. "They say if you can garden on Beacon Hill, you can garden anywhere in Boston. With more shade than sun, with soil that is laced with brick dust (from the old paved laundry yards), with imperious tree roots that heave up brickwork, it's a challenge to make a hidden garden something worth showing the public."

It is organized as a 501(c)(3) Public Charity; in 2025 it claimed total revenue of $203,609 and total assets of $196,861.

== See also ==
- Garden club
- Urban horticulture

== Newspaper coverage ==
- Beacon Hill opens hidden gardens to public for day. Daily Boston Globe, May 19, 1931
- Beacon Hill Gardens Plan 'Open House.' Christian Science Monitor, Apr 28, 1953
- Linda Matchan. Rolling Out The Welcome Mat: At Historic Houses, Hidden Gardens. Boston Globe, May 15, 1980.
- Frances Minturn Howard et al. Hidden Gardens of Beacon Hill. Boston: Beacon Hill Garden Club, 1972, 1987.
- Carol Stocker. Celebrating The Creativity Behind Gardens Of Boston. Boston Globe, May 1, 2003.
- Karen Cord Taylor. To Host Beacon Hill Garden Tour, Plant, Prune, And Cross Fingers. Boston Globe, May 19, 2005.
