= 1867 Boston mayoral election =

Election in Massachusetts, United States

- December 9, 1867
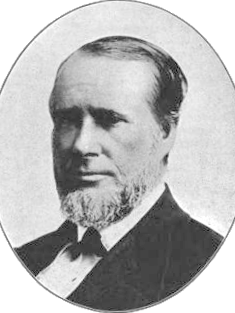

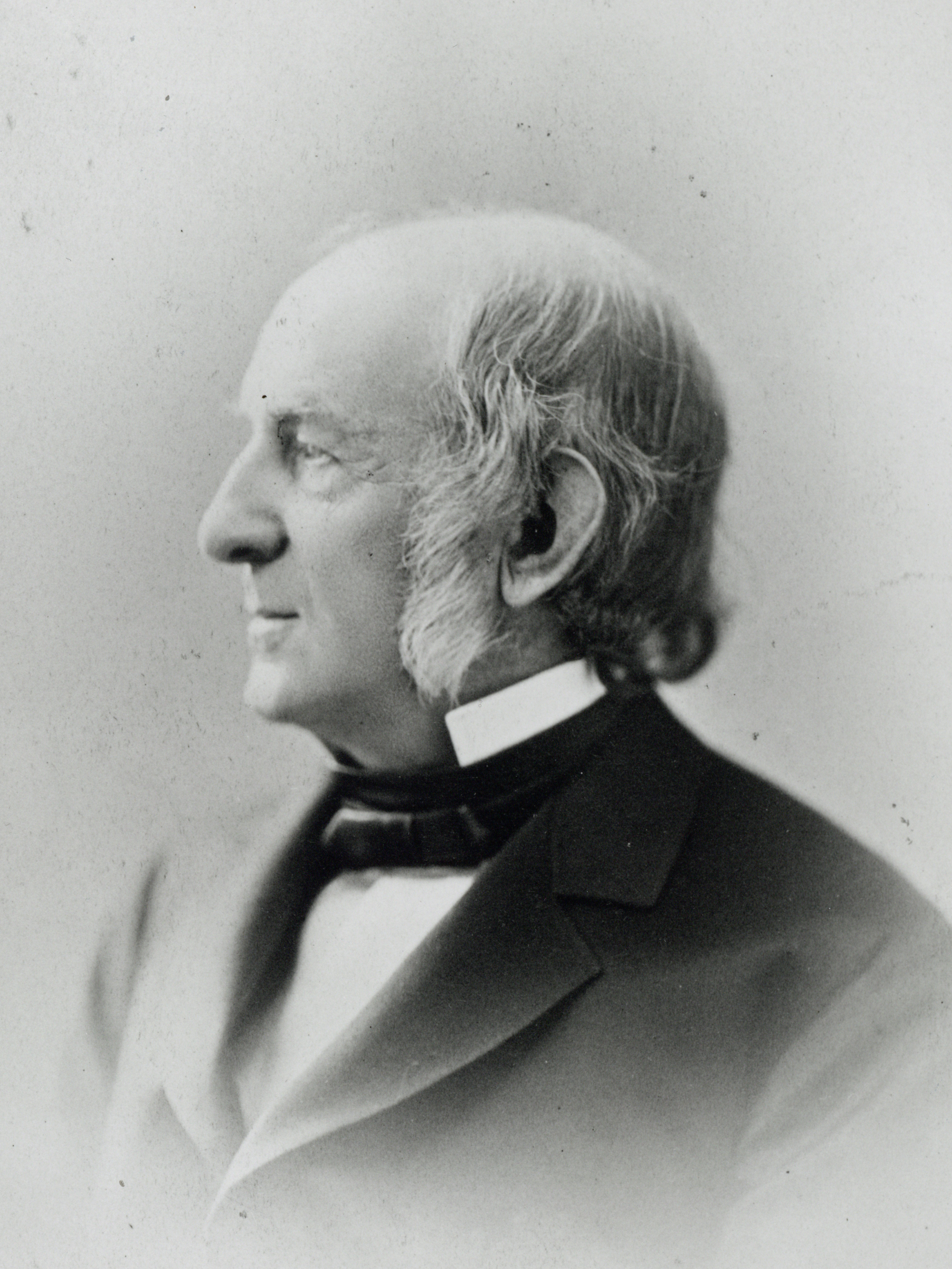
Candidate	Nathaniel B. Shurtleff	Otis Norcross
Party	Democratic	Republican
Popular vote	8,383	7,867
Percentage	51.53%	48.36%
Mayor before election
Otis Norcross
Republican
Elected mayor
Nathaniel B. Shurtleff
Democratic

The 1867 Boston mayoral election saw the election of Democratic nominee Nathaniel B. Shurtleff, who unseated Republican incumbent Otis Norcross. The Democratic victory came in a nationally strong year for Democratic Party electoral gains.

== Nominees ==
- Otis Norcross (Republican): incumbent mayor since 1867, former chairman of the Boston Board of Aldermen
- Nathaniel B. Shurtleff (Democrat): Democratic nominee for mayor in 1865 and 1866; Know Nothing nominee for mayor in 1855

== Results ==
1867 Boston mayoral election
Party	Candidate	Votes	%
Democratic	Nathaniel B. Shurtleff	8,383	51.53
Republican	Otis Norcross (incumbent)	7,867	48.36
Others	Scattering	18	0.11
Total votes		16,268	100.00

The election was closely contested. Democratic nominee Shurtleff defeated Republican incumbent Norcross. Shurtleff carried wards 1, 2, 3, 5, 7, 9, 13, 15. Norcross carried wards 4, 6, 8, 10, 11, 12, 14.

After the coinciding Boston City Council elections, the Republicans were left with majorities in both chambers. The Board of Aldermen had 7 Republican members and 5 Democratic members. The Common Council had 38 Republicans and 22 Democratic members.

By the standards of the Reconstruction era, Democrats had fared well in elections held in 1867. That year, Republicans lost sizable ground to the Democrats in eighteen out of the twenty states that held elections. Republicans only improved upon their 1866 election performances in the states of Michigan and Kentucky. In Connecticut's April elections, Democrats had won the governorship and three of the state's four House seats, marking the Republican Party's first losses in a Northern state since 1864. As the year went on, the Democratic party enjoyed further success at the Republican Party's expense, including winning control of the Ohio General Assembly. Democrats also came close to winning the 1867 Ohio gubernatorial election, with Republicans only managing a narrow victory.

Boston's electorate had long favored Republicans, making a Democratic victory in its mayoral race notable. In addition to Boston, the Democratic Party also won the previously-Republican mayoralties in several other cities; winning the Baltimore, Manchester (New Hampshire), and Pittsburgh mayoral elections. Democratic Party-sympathetic newspapers, including the Wheeling Register and New York World, touted the mayoral victories in Boston and other cities as indicative of growing national support for the Democratic Party. The Cincinnati Enquirer wrote,

The late Democratic triumphs in Boston and Pittsburgh, at their municipal elections, are among the strongest evidence that the political reaction which has been sweeping over the country with such force during the past year is still going on with increased momentum and violence. A year ago, if there had been two places upon the face of the earth that the Democrats would have conceded as the most hopeless for them, they would have been the great Radical [Republican] strongholds of Boston in the East, and Pittsburgh in Pennsylvania, in each of which the Radical majorities have for years raged high into the thousands. Now the Republican organization has been beaten, and badly beaten in both of them, and Democratic Mayors elected triumphantly.

== See also ==
- List of mayors of Boston, Massachusetts
