= 1859 Boston mayoral election =

Election in Massachusetts, United States

- December 12, 1859
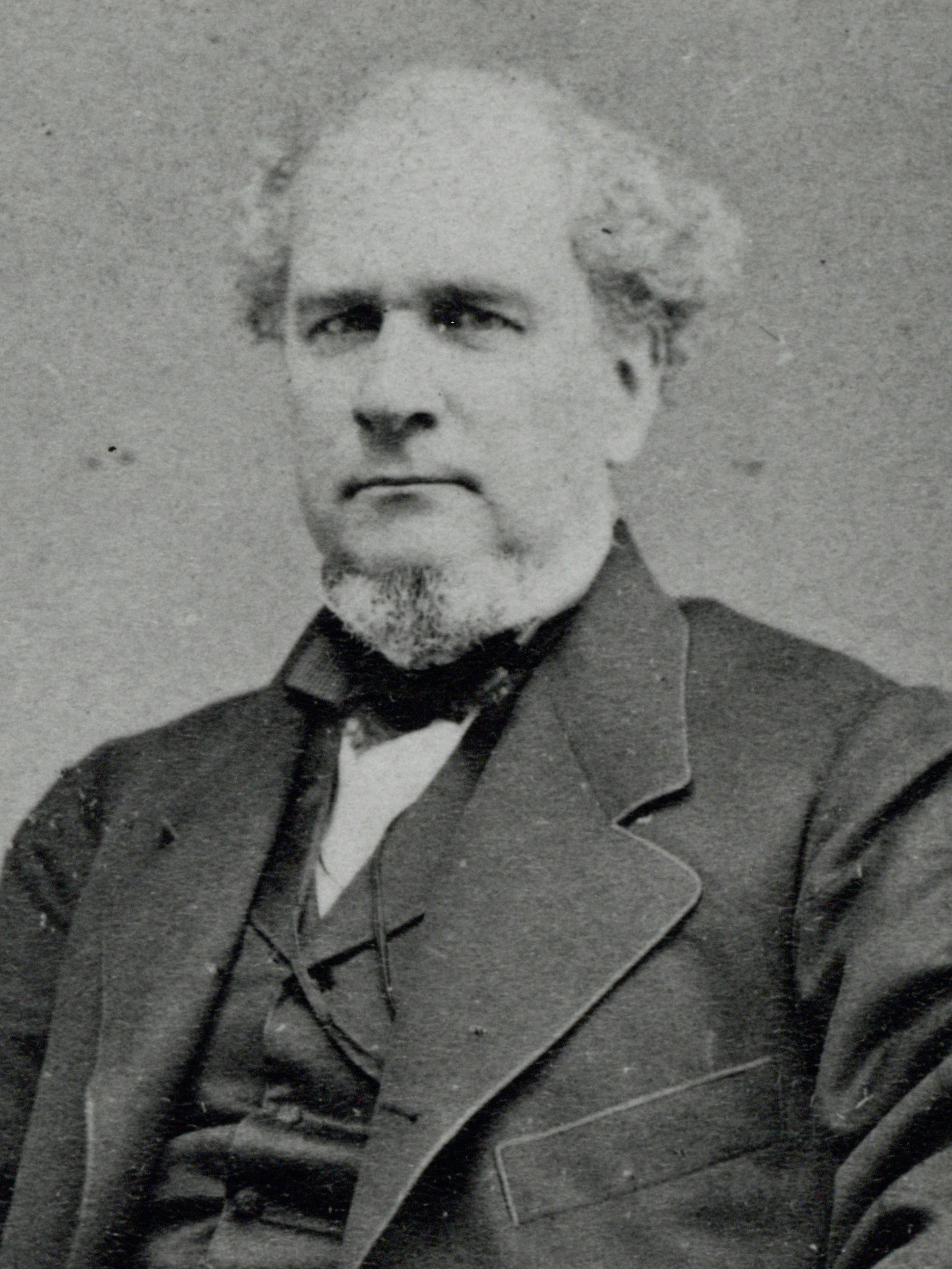

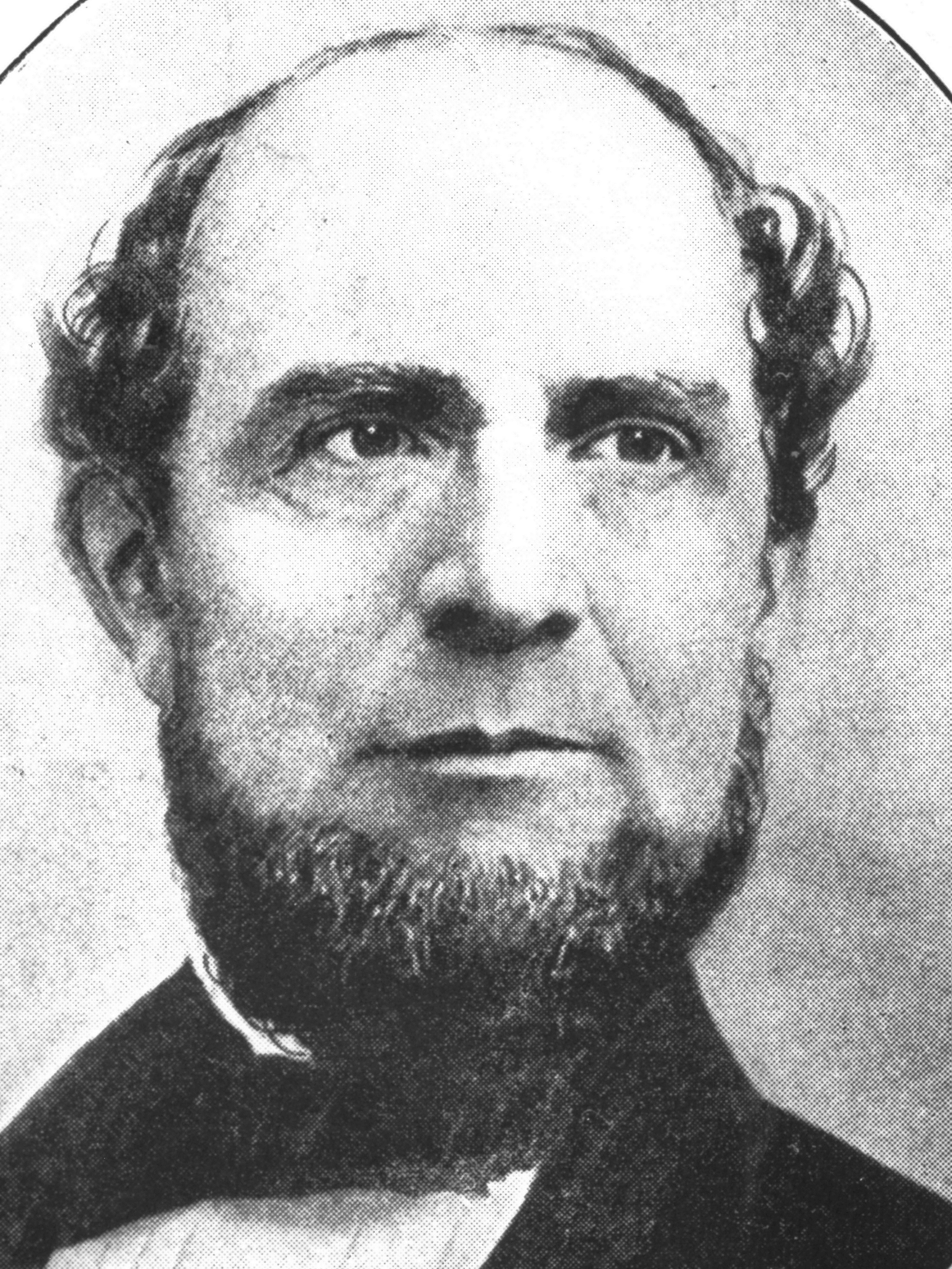

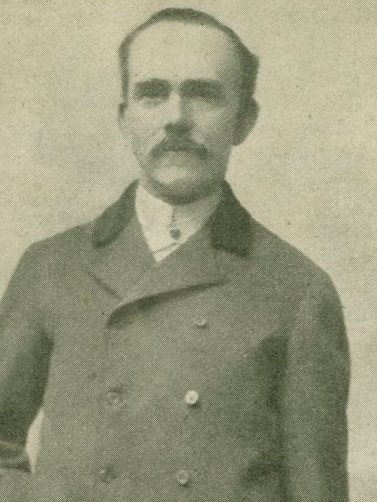
Candidate	Frederic W. Lincoln Jr.	Joseph Wightman	Julius A. Palmer Jr.
Party	Citizens	Democratic Party	Temperance
Popular vote	5,950	4,827	628
Percentage	52.10%	42.26%	5.50%
Mayor before election
Frederic W. Lincoln Jr.
Republican
Elected mayor
Frederic W. Lincoln Jr.
Republican

The Boston mayoral election of 1859 saw the reelection of Frederic W. Lincoln Jr. to a third consecutive term. It was held on December 12, 1859.

Lincoln was nominated on a "Citizens" ticket, but received support from "old Whigs and Conservatives". He was considered to be a Republican. Wightman was nominated by the Democratic Party. Palmer was nominated by a temperance party.

== Results ==
1859 Boston mayoral election
Party	Candidate	Votes	%
Citizens	Frederic W. Lincoln Jr. (incumbent)	5,950	52.10
Democratic	Joseph Wightman	4,827	42.26
Temperance	Julius A. Palmer Jr.	628	5.50
Other	Scattering	16	0.14
Turnout		11,421	

== See also ==
- List of mayors of Boston, Massachusetts
