= Sereno Edwards Bishop =

Hawaiian scientist and Presbyterian minister

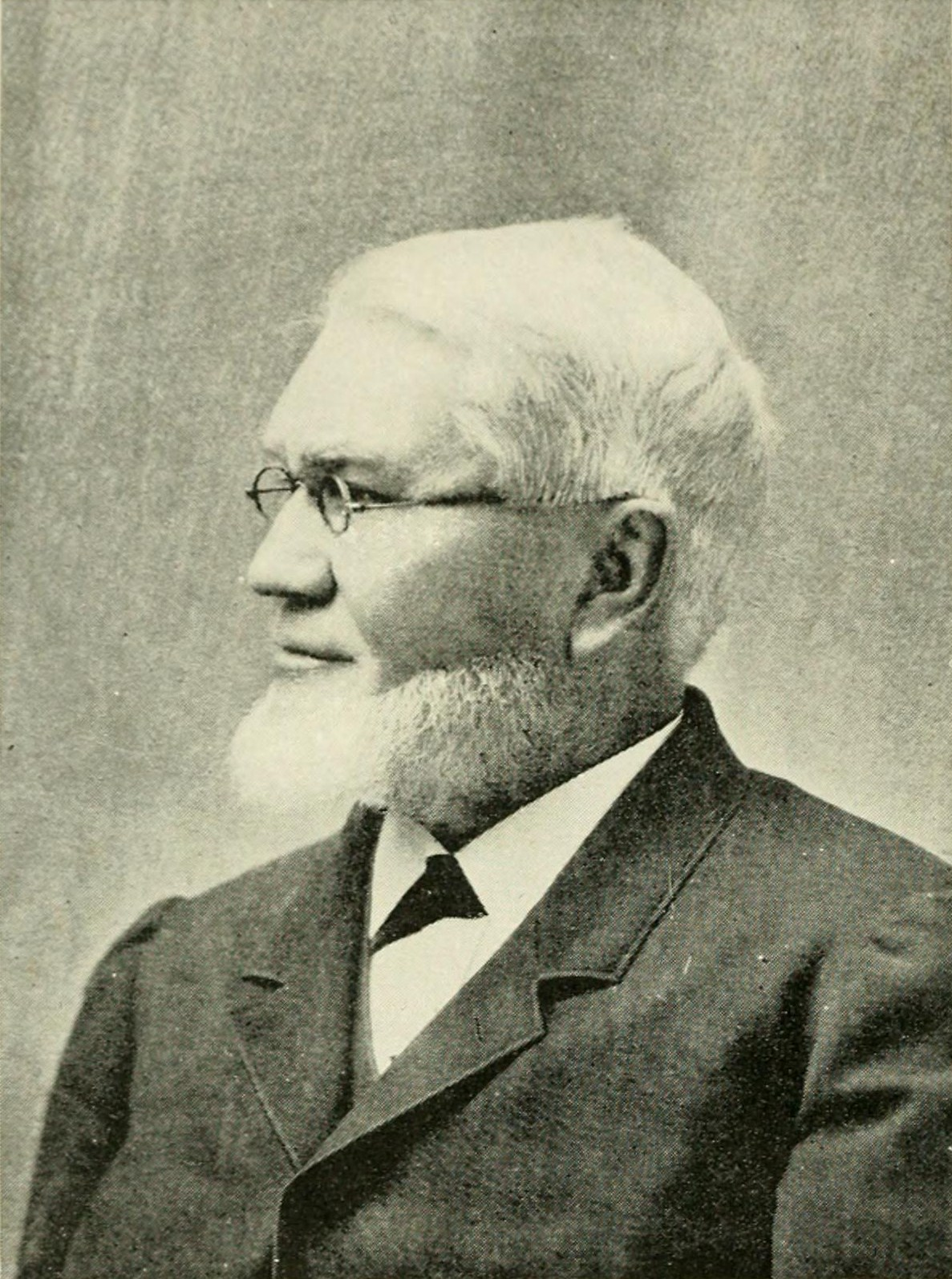
- Born: February 7, 1827; Kaʻawaloa, Hawaii
- Died: March 23, 1909 (aged 82); Honolulu, Territory of Hawaii
- Education: Amherst College, Auburn Theological Seminary
- Known for: Theologian, political activities
- Spouse: Cornelia Ann Sessions
- Children: Edward Fletcher Bishop; Charles Artemas Bishop; George Sessions Bishop; John Sessions Bishop; Elizabeth Delia Bishop Shaw

Sereno Edwards Bishop (February 7, 1827 – March 23, 1909) was a scientist, Presbyterian minister and publisher. He was an avid proponent of the United States annexation of the Hawaiian Islands, and aligned himself with the political faction who overthrew the monarchy under Liliuokalani.

== Early life ==
He was born in the Kingdom of Hawaii during the reign of Kamehameha III, to missionaries Rev. Artemas Bishop and Elizabeth Edwards Bishop at Kaʻawaloa on the island of Hawaii. At the time of his birth, his father was in the process of translating the Bible into the Hawaiian language. His mother died three weeks after he was born, and his father remarried in December to Delia Stone Bishop.

== Ministry and teaching profession ==
At the age of twelve, he was sent back to the mainland for his education, graduating from Amherst College and Auburn Theological Seminary. He married Cornelia Ann Session on May 31, 1852, and was ordained into the ministry in June at the Third Presbyterian Church of New York City. The newlyweds departed immediately for Hawaii, arriving January 15, 1853. He accepted a position as Chaplain of the American Seaman's Friend Society in Lahaina, replacing Rev. Townsend E. Taylor. In 1854 he was elected as an officer for The Hawaiian Missionary Society. Minister of the Interior Keoni Ana licensed him in August to perform marriages in the Kingdom of Hawaii. Between 1862 and 1865, Bishop lived in Hana as a missionary with the American Missionary Association. His social ties to the family of Lorrin A. Thurston, who would be a key player in removing Liliuokalani from power, dated back to when Bishop became principal of Lahainaluna High School in 1865.

The Salvadorian ship Dolores Ugarte docked in Honolulu in August 1870 with several hundred Chinese coolie laborers, either indentured or slave labor, locked in the cramped ship's hold. Forty-two of the most seriously ill were taken off and abandoned, apparently by the ship's captain who saw no profit in taking them further. News of the incident created a controversy in Hawaii, not the least of which was a letter Bishop wrote to the Pacific Commercial Advertiser, taking his fellow Christians to task for their seemingly lack of reactions, "Where is your public sentiment, your indignation meetings? Your resistless popular wrath?" The Hawaiian Gazette rebutted the controversy, and Bishop in particular, while defending the captain.

On Sunday night, February 19, 1871, an earthquake occurred off the island of Lanai. According to the Environmental Center at the University of Hawaiʻi, it was felt as far south as the island of Hawaii and as far north as Niihau. Bishop was living in a house provided for the principal of Lahainaluna High School, and reported that his house was destroyed in the shaking. He put the time at 10:15 p.m. Scientists at the center in 1985 estimated that the quake had a magnitude of 7.0 on the Richter scale (although the scale was not yet developed). His house was one of several that the government assessed as so badly damaged that it was easier to build a new one.

== Politics ==
The Bishops moved to Honolulu in 1877, and he became employed by the Government Survey Department during the reign of King Kalākaua; the department not only created geographical maps but also subdivided and auctioned property. As part of the Ministry of the Interior, he was presented to Liliuokalani, at that time Princess Regent, at Iolani Palace on the occasion of her September 2, 1881 birthday celebration. Bishop's political leanings came more to the forefront during this period. Being a religious conservative, he was strongly opposed to any passage of a lottery bill. At odds with Minister of the Interior Charles T. Gulick he resigned from his government job in late 1885 or early 1886. He began to politically align himself with his old friend Lorrin A. Thurston, who would eventually form the Committee of Safety that overthrew the monarchy in January 1893. At the time Bishop resigned from the Government Survey Department, Thurston was making a successful run for Representative in the legislature of the Kingdom. The Pacific Commercial Advertiser of January 21, 1886 commented, "We really did expect better things from the Rev. S. E. Bishop than to find him lending his name to the campaign lies which Mr. L. A. Thurston and his political partners put forward to influence votes."

Bishop took over the editorial desk of The Friend in 1887 and ran it until 1902. While some believed he used it to pursue his political agenda, others called it a "crowning service to this community and to humanity". He was a leader of the push towards Hawaii's annexation by the United States; at the same time, he was also steadfast in his opinion of the white man's superiority to the Hawaiian race. Annexation and racial issues co-mingled in what he wrote, and he stirred controversy. One of Bishop's frequent outlets, writing under the pseudonym Kamehameha, was The Washington Evening Star. Therein he pressed for annexation while stressing that English was the language of the islands and that the typical Hawaiian was "average weakness of intellect is incapable of mastering the use of English." In both Hawaii's newspapers and in The Washington Evening Star under his Kamehameha alias, he targeted Liliuokalani's friend and personal assistant Julius A. Palmer Jr.

He testified for James H. Blount for the 1893 Blount Report, expressing superiority of the white race, citing Hawaiians in all levels of government as "notoriously incompetent" and was opposed to voting enfranchisement for the Hawaiian race. Legal historian Neil Thomas Proto has stated that Hawaii's Story by Hawaii's Queen was a retort to the insults hurled at Liliuokalani by Bishop. He had attacked her morals and religious faith, the coarse texture of her hair, and her facial expressions. As evidence of her moral shortcomings he accused her of dancing the hula that had been banned by missionaries but revived by King Kalākaua. Bishop refused to review her published book for The Friend.

== Scientific observations ==
Bishop's Ring is a solar halo that occurs after a volcanic eruption. The first recorded detailed observation of it was by Sereno Bishop after the 1883 eruption of Krakatoa.

He was a regular contributor to The Hawaiian Star newspaper on scientific subjects, from debating specific points of a Charles Henry Hitchcock publication on the origin of volcanoes, to offering explanations of sun spots. Bishop was well-read on contemporary astronomers of his day such as William Henry Pickering and Robert Stawell Ball. Several of his written works can be found in scientific publications of his era. His continuous contributions on the subjects of Earth sciences and the Solar System were indicative of his primary fields of scientific interest.

In February 1907 he reported on the eruptions of Mauna Loa to the Washington D. C. newspaper The Evening Star, with a detailed scientific history of volcanic eruptions in Hawaii. Several months later when a debate arose over the anticipated decline of the Hawaiian atoll Laysan, when some believed it was in the process of sinking into the ocean, Bishop provided a geological history of the atoll to The Hawaiian Star.

== Personal life ==
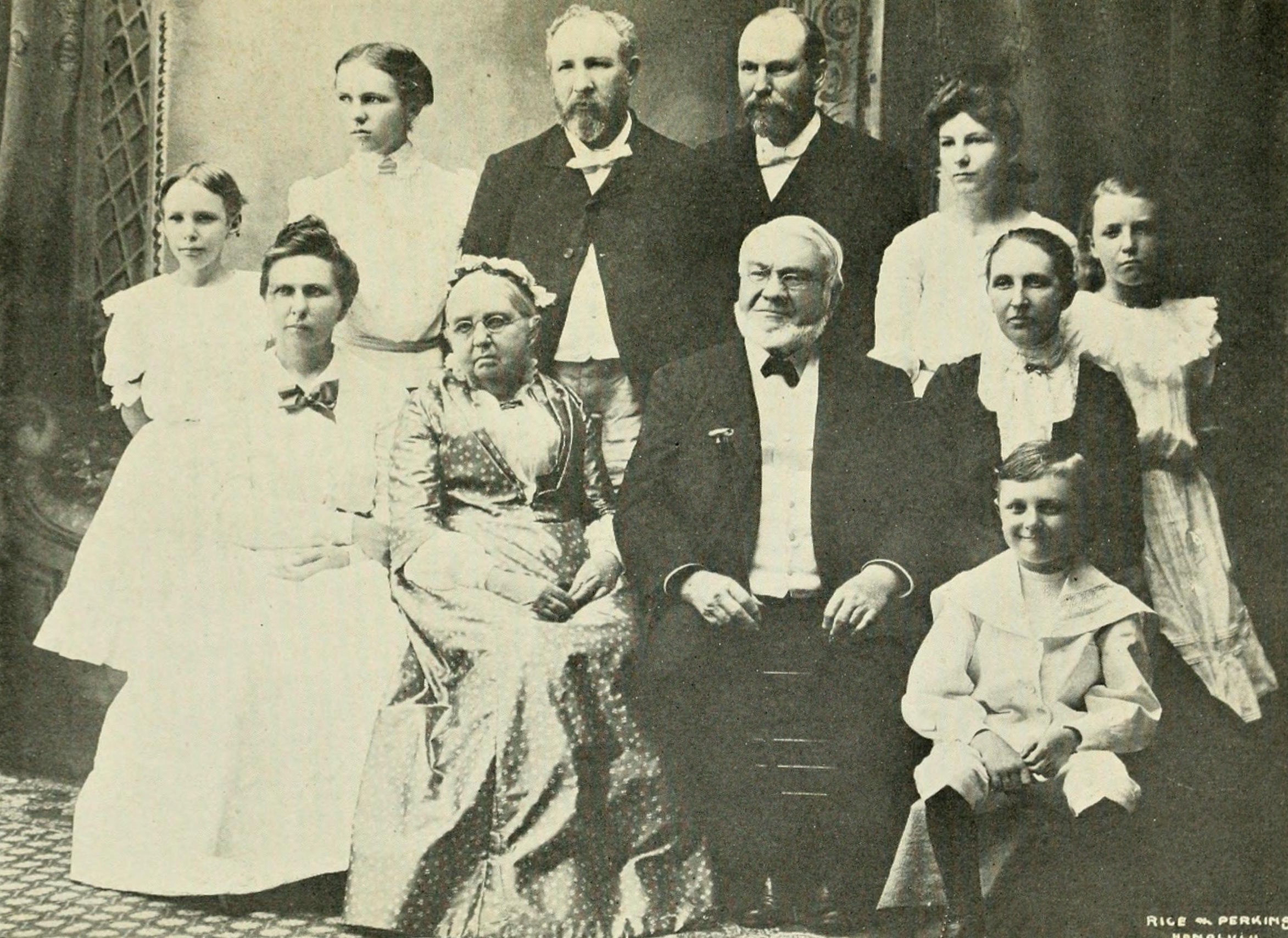
Rev. Sereno Edwards Bishop, His Wife, Children And Grandchildren. Taken Upon The Bishop's Golden Wedding Day, May 31, 1902

While still living on Maui, Bishop was a member of the Hawaii Evangelical Association, and was elected as vice president of the Haiku Sugar Company.

In Honolulu, the Bishops made Fort Street Church their home church, and continued with that body when it merged with Oahu Bethel to become Bethel Union Church . Rev. Bishop became a Trustee with Bethel.

Sereno and Cornelia celebrated their 50th wedding anniversary in 1902 with a party that provided entertainment by Henri Berger conducting the Royal Hawaiian Band. They were the parents of five children, all born while the family resided in Lahaina, but only two (John and Delia) survived him.

1. Edward Fletcher Bishop (1853–1875), died young while studying at Amherst College.
2. Charles Artemas Bishop (1855–1858), died young.
3. George Sessions Bishop (1857–1858), died young.
4. John Sessions Bishop (1859–1951), married Alice Moore and resettled in Forest Grove, Oregon. They had two children: Helen Cornelia Bishop and John Egbert Bishop.
5. Elizabeth Delia Bishop (1862–1937), married Jonathan Shaw. The couple lived in Honolulu and had three children: Ruth Cornelia Shaw, Jessie Cunningham Shaw, Margaret Fenton Shaw Humphrey.

Bishop died at his home on March 23, 1909. He had been in declining health for a couple of years, due to multiple strokes and the onset of dementia. He was cremated, and his ashes buried in the missionary cemetery at Kawaiahaʻo Church.

Cornelia Bishop had established a boarding school for girls when they lived on Maui. Throughout their marriage, she was active in the Strangers' Friend Society, the Ladies' Benevolent Society of Fort Street Church and the Woman's Board of Missions. She outlived her husband by more than a decade, dying in a leap year on February 29, 1920. Her remains were also cremated and buried with her husband in the missionary cemetery at Kawaiahaʻo Church. Of her 94 years, 67 had been spent in the Hawaiian Islands.

== Selected bibliography ==
=== General ===
- Shaw, Albert (September 1891). "The Hawaiian Queen and Her Kingdom". Review of Reviews and World's Work. 4: 147–163.
- Bacon, Leonard; Thompson, Joseph Parrish; Storrs, Richard Salter; Leavitt, Joshua; Beecher, Henry Ward; Tilton, Theodore; Bowen, Henry Chandler; Ward, William Hayes; Holt, Hamilton; Franklin, Fabian; Fuller, Harold de Wolf; Herter, Christian Archibald (March 14, 1895). "The Trial of Ex-Queen Liliuokalani". The Independent. Vol. XLVII, no. 2415. Honolulu. pp. 3–4.
- "How Has Hawaii Become Americanized?". Overland Monthly and Out West Magazine. 25 (150). Making of America Journals: 597–601. June 1895.
- "Old Times in Hawaii: Recollections of Rev. Dr. Bishop – Glimpses of Missionary Life". The Pacific Commercial Advertiser. Honolulu, Oahu, Hawaii. June 11, 1901. p. 2 – via Chronicling America: Historic American Newspapers. Lib. of Congress.
- "How Hawaiian People Were Won From Savagery". The Pacific Commercial Advertiser. Honolulu, Oahu, Hawaii. January 3, 1904. p. 6 – via Chronicling America: Historic American Newspapers. Lib. of Congress.
- "Dr. S. E. Bishop Discusses Miracles". The Pacific Commercial Advertiser. Honolulu, Oahu, Hawaii. January 19, 1904. p. 5 – via Chronicling America: Historic American Newspapers. Lib. of Congress.

=== Scientific ===
- Bishop, S. E. (February 22, 1884). "The Red Skies in the Pacific". Science. 3 (55): 216–217. Bibcode:1884Sci.....3..216B. doi:10.1126/science.ns-3.55.216. JSTOR 1759654. PMID 17775665.
- Bishop, S. E. (March 4, 1887). "The Recent Eruption of Mauna Loa". Science. 9 (213). American Association for the Advancement of Science: 205–207. doi:10.1126/science.ns-9.213.205. JSTOR 1763998. PMID 17735624.
- Bishop, Sereno E. (August 23, 1889). "Sunset Glows". Science. 14 (342). American Association for the Advancement of Science: 137–138. doi:10.1126/science.ns-14.342.137. JSTOR 1764914. PMID 17814683. S2CID 8693234.
- Bishop, Sereno E. (May 1, 1891). "Recent Progress in Solar Physics as Bearing upon the Cause of the Ice Age". Science. 17 (430): 239–241. Bibcode:1891Sci....17..239B. doi:10.1126/science.ns-17.430.239. JSTOR 1766671. PMID 17788237.
- Bishop, Sereno E. (July 17, 1891). "Atmospheric and Seismic Influences". Science. 18 (441): 39. Bibcode:1891Sci....18...39B. doi:10.1126/science.ns-18.441.39. JSTOR 1766414. PMID 17841013.
- Bishop, Sereno E. (April 7, 1893). "Probable Causes of Rainy Period in Southern Peru". Science. 21 (531): 192–193. Bibcode:1893Sci....21..192B. doi:10.1126/science.ns-21.531.192. JSTOR 1767043. PMID 17744517.
- Bishop, Sereno E. (March 13, 1896). "The Temperature of the Earth's Crust". Science. 3 (63): 409. doi:10.1126/science.3.63.409. JSTOR 1625609. PMID 17777459.
- Bishop, S. E. (September 9, 1904). "The Cold-Current System of the Pacific, and Source of the Pacific Coast Current". Science. 20 (506): 338–341. Bibcode:1904Sci....20..338B. doi:10.1126/science.20.506.338. JSTOR 1630285. PMID 17757075.
