= 1858 Boston mayoral election =

Election in Massachusetts, United States

- December 13, 1858
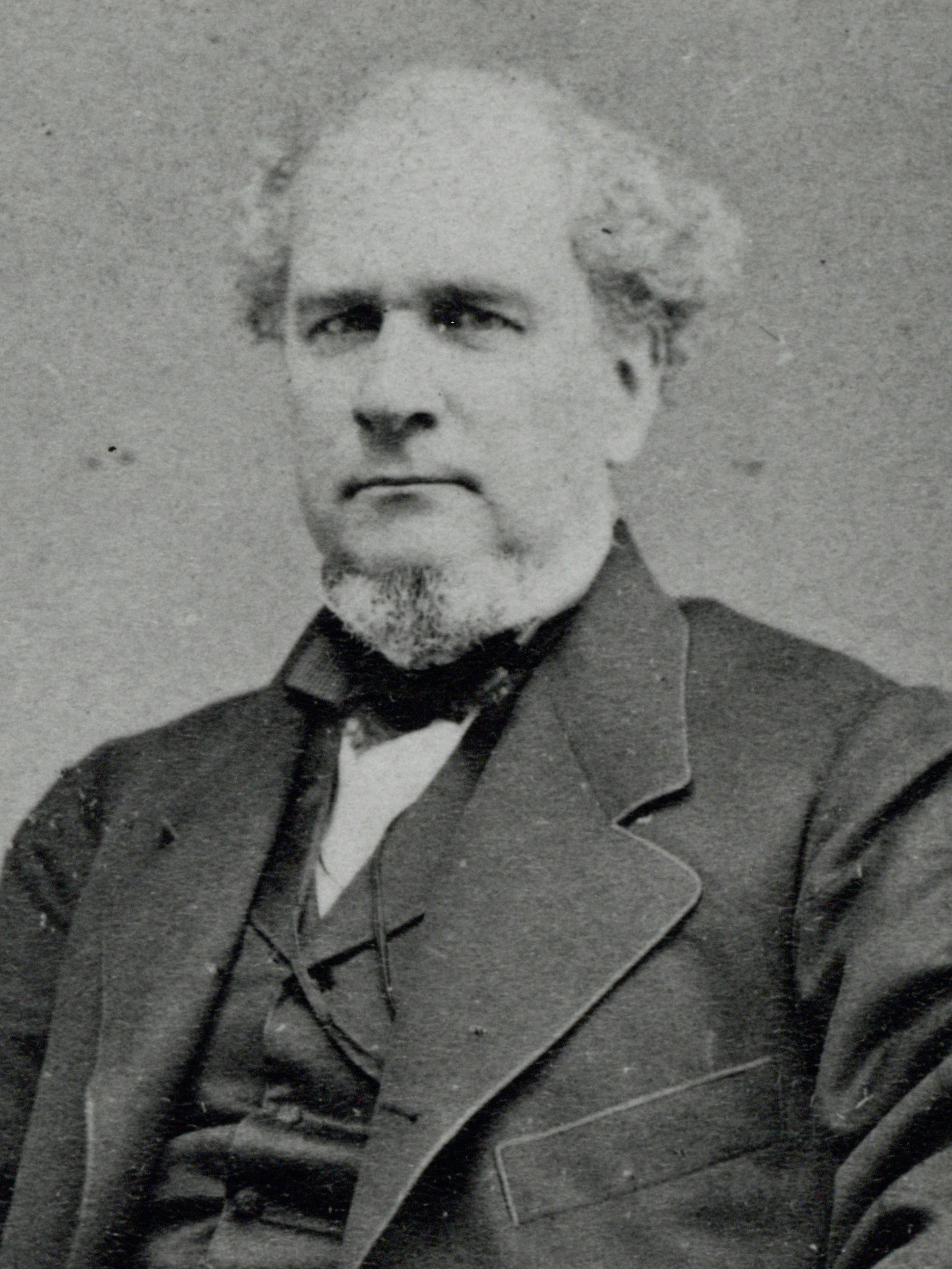

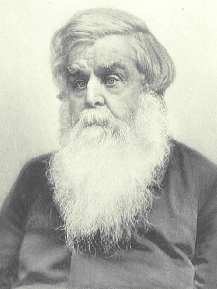

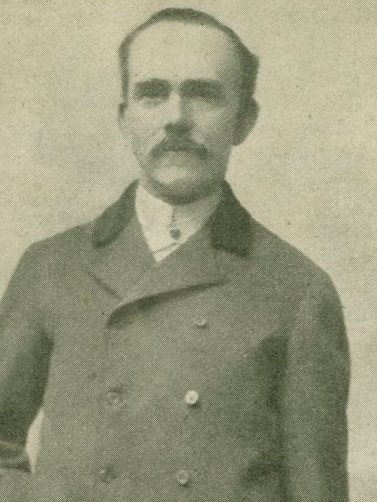
Candidate	Frederic W. Lincoln Jr.	Moses Kimball	Julius A. Palmer Jr.
Party	Citizens	Republican	Temperance
Popular vote	6,298	4,449	1,007
Percentage	52.65%	37.20%	8.42%
Mayor before election
Frederic W. Lincoln Jr.
Elected mayor
Frederic W. Lincoln Jr.

The Boston mayoral election of 1858 saw the reelection of Frederic W. Lincoln Jr. It was held on December 13, 1858.

Lincoln was nominated on a "Citizens" ticket supported by a nonpartisan group of residents. Kimball was nominated by the Republicans and Palmer was nominated by a temperance party.

Although nominated by both the People's Union and National American (Know Nothing) parties, former mayor Jerome V. C. Smith declined to campaign.

== Results ==
1858 Boston mayoral election
Party	Candidate	Votes	%
Citizen's ticket	Frederic W. Lincoln Jr. (incumbent)	6,298	52.65
Republican	Moses Kimball	4,449	37.20
Temperance	Julius A. Palmer Jr.	1,007	8.42
Know Nothing	Jerome V. C. Smith	183	1.53
Other	Scattering	24	0.20
Turnout		11,961	100

== See also ==
- List of mayors of Boston, Massachusetts
