= 1866 Boston mayoral election =

Election in Massachusetts, United States

- December 10, 1866
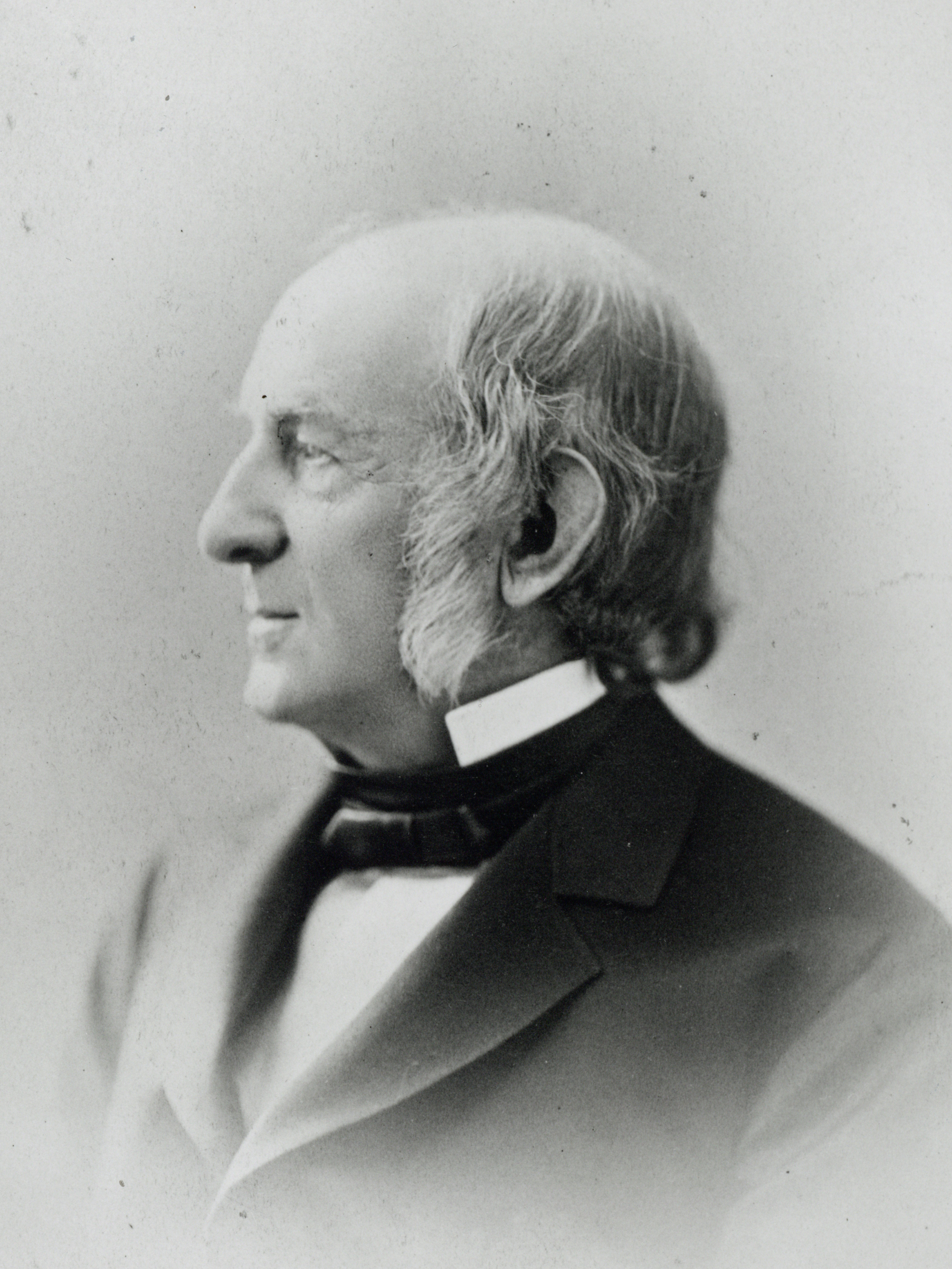

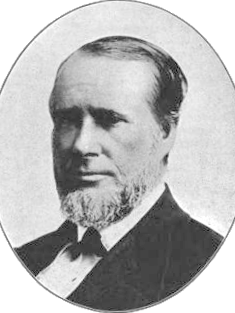
Candidate	Otis Norcross	Nathaniel B. Shurtleff
Party	Republican	Democratic
Popular vote	5,662	4,755
Percentage	54.18%	45.50%
Mayor before election
Frederic W. Lincoln Jr.
Republican
Elected mayor
Otis Norcross
Republican

The Boston mayoral election of 1866 saw the election of Republican Party nominee Otis Norcross.

The election saw a significant role played by the city's African American electorate, who formed an electoral partnership for the elections with the city's Democratic Party.

== Role of African American voters ==
The election saw a significant role by African American voters, who largely supported the city's Democratic ticket. In the November elections that preceded it, Massachusetts became first state in New England to elect African American state legislators, including representing part of Boston. Boston Democrats and Irish American voters formed a partnership with the city's African American electorate for the December municipal elections, with African American voters voting for Democrats, and Democrats and Irish American Voters backing the candidacy of an African American candidate for the Boston Common Council in the same area of Boston that had elected an African American state legislator the month prior. This candidate came close to joining the Common Council, tying in the December 10 vote for the seat he was seeking. A special election was held later that month to determine the holder of the seat, which he lost.

== Result ==
After what was described to be a quiet election, Republican nominee Otis Norcross won by a sizable margin. The Republican ticket was also successful in winning all seats in the coinciding election to the Boston Board of Aldermen.

1866 Boston mayoral election
Party	Candidate	Votes	%
Republican	Otis Norcross	5,662	54.18
Democratic	Nathaniel B. Shurtleff	4,755	45.50
Others	Scattering	33	0.32
Total votes		10,450	100

== See also ==
- List of mayors of Boston, Massachusetts
