= 1869 Boston mayoral election =

Election in Massachusetts, United States

- December 13, 1869
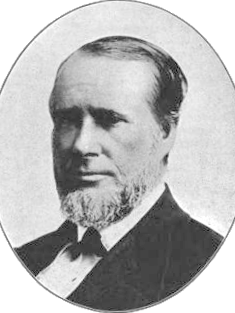

Candidate	Nathaniel B. Shurtleff	George P. Baldwin
Party	Citizens	Democratic
Alliance	Republican
Popular vote	13,054	4,790
Percentage	70.80%	25.98%
Mayor before election
Nathaniel B. Shurtleff
Elected mayor
Nathaniel B. Shurtleff

The Boston mayoral election of 1869 saw the reelection of Nathaniel B. Shurtleff to a third consecutive term.

== Nominations ==
The city's Democratic Party committees decided against renominating incumbent Democratic mayor Nathaniel B. Shurtleff. Thereafter, a "Citizen" movement was formed for the purposes of providing a party to nominate Surtleff for reelection. This movement also nominated candidates for the coinciding Boston City Council elections. The city's Republicans had originally nominated Major Chadwick. However, Chadwick opted to withdraw his candidacy, and the Republican Party thereafter decided to also place Shurtleff as their nominee. The Democratic Party nominated Alderman George P. Baldwin. The Prohibition Party nominated George H. Johnston, a city alderman. Nathaniel Chase was nominated by Labor Reform.

== Results ==
1869 Boston mayoral election
Party	Candidate	Votes	%
Citizens/Republican	Nathaniel B. Shurtleff (incumbent)	13,054	70.80
Democratic	George P. Baldwin	4,790	25.98
Prohibition	George H. Johnston	338	1.83
Labor Reform	Nathaniel Chase	206	1.12
Others	Scattering	50	0.27
Total votes		18,438	100

== See also ==
- List of mayors of Boston, Massachusetts
