= 1868 Boston mayoral election =

Election in Massachusetts, United States

- December 14, 1868
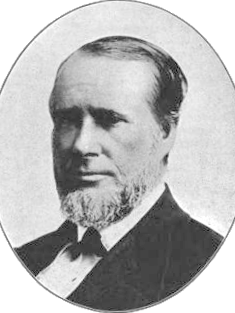

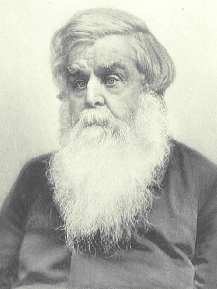
Candidate	Nathaniel B. Shurtleff	Moses Kimball
Party	Democratic	Republican
Popular vote	11,005	9,156
Percentage	54.14%	45.05%
Mayor before election
Nathaniel B. Shurtleff
Democratic
Elected mayor
Nathaniel B. Shurtleff
Democratic

The Boston mayoral election of 1868 saw the reelection of Nathaniel B. Shurtleff.

== Nominations ==
Democrats renominated incumbent mayor Nathaniel B. Shurtleff for a second term.

Republicans nominated Moses Kimball, a state representative who had received support from the city's prohibitionists.

== Results ==
Nathaniel B. Shurtleff defeated his Republican opponent by a sizable margin. This came despite Republican presidential nominee Ulysses S. Grant having carried the city's electorate by a margin of 8,000 votes six weeks prior. Republicans won two-thirds of seats on the Board of Alderman in the coinciding Boston City Council election. The Chicago Tribune faulted Kimball's stance in support of prohibition, as aldermanic candidates avoided the question of liquor during their campaigns. A news dispatch that was sent out following the election alternatively faulted opposition from American Civil War veterans over Kimball's previous opposition to a bill in the state legislature regarding soldiers' bounties.

1868 Boston mayoral election
Party	Candidate	Votes	%
Democratic	Nathaniel B. Shurtleff (incumbent)	11,005	54.14
Republican	Moses Kimball	9,156	45.05
Workingman	Isaac W. May	143	0.70
Others	Scattering	22	0.11
Total votes		20,326	100

== See also ==
- List of mayors of Boston, Massachusetts
