= 1857 Boston mayoral election =

Election in Massachusetts, United States

- December 14, 1857
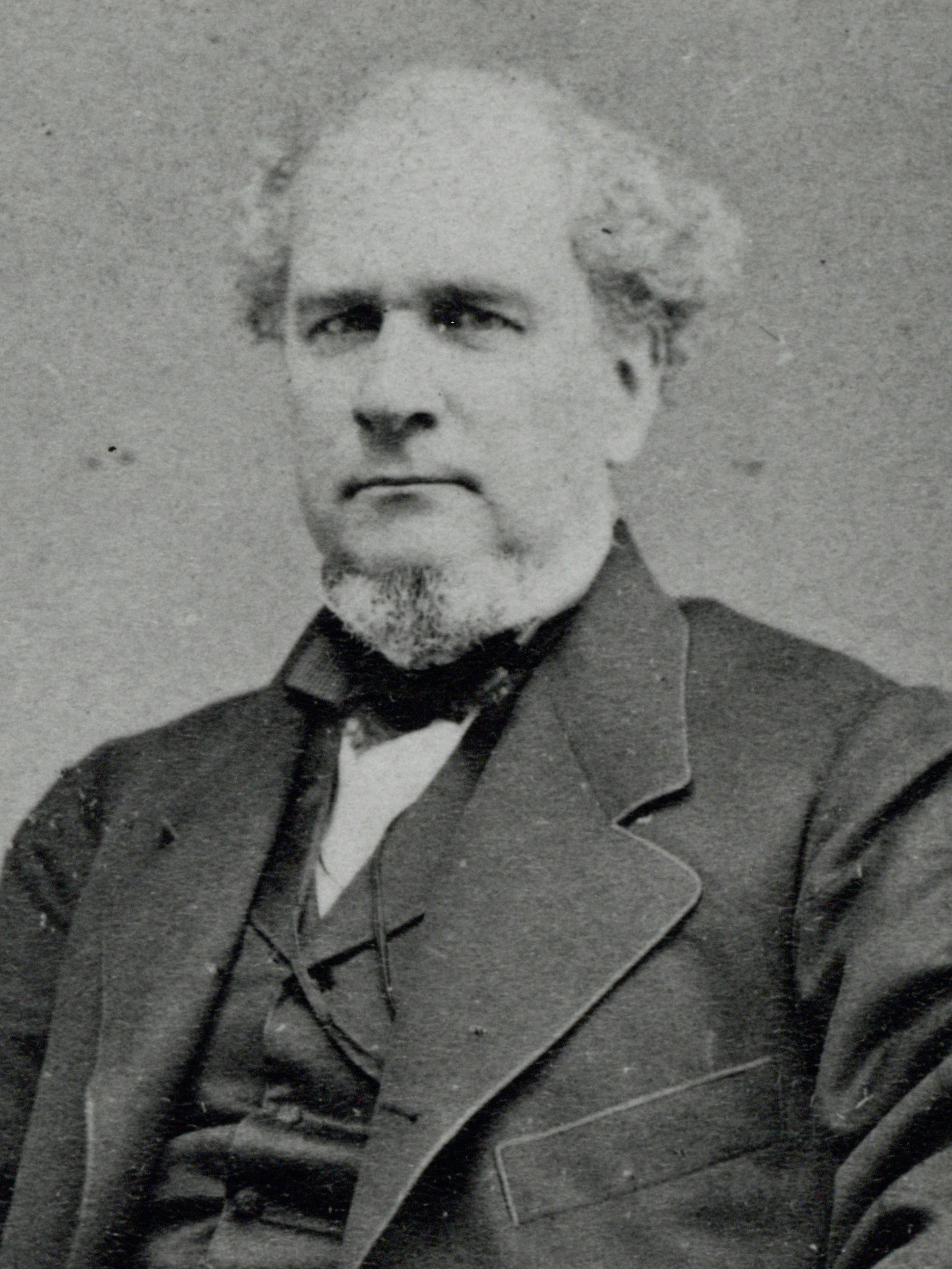

Candidate	Frederic W. Lincoln Jr.	Charles B. Hall
Party	Faneuil Hall	Citizens
Popular vote	8,110	4,193
Percentage	65.81%	34.03%
Mayor before election
Alexander H. Rice
Elected mayor
Frederic W. Lincoln Jr.

The Boston mayoral election of 1857 saw the election of Frederic W. Lincoln Jr. It was held on December 14, 1857.

Lincoln ran on the "Faneuil Hall"/"Citizens" ticket. His opponent, Charles B. Hall, ran on a "Citizen's" ticket.

== Results ==
1857 Boston mayoral election
Candidate	Votes	%
Frederic W. Lincoln Jr.	8,110	65.81%
Charles B. Hall	4,193	34.03%
Scattering	20	0.16%
Turnout	12,323	%

== See also ==
- List of mayors of Boston, Massachusetts
