= Otis Norcross =

American mayor

The Honorable Otis Norcross
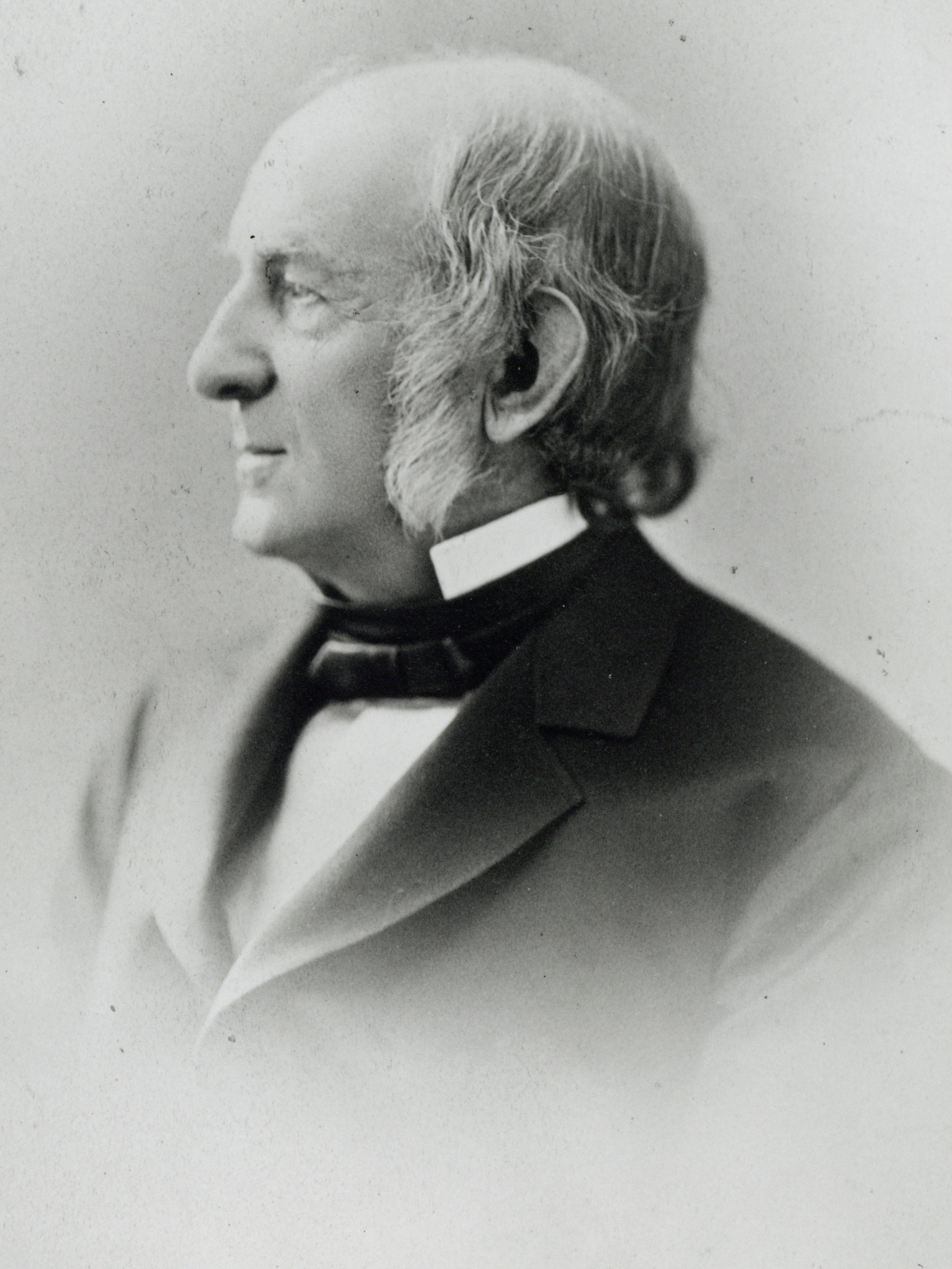

Mayor of Boston
- In office January 7, 1867 – January 6, 1868
- Preceded by: Frederic W. Lincoln Jr.
- Succeeded by: Nathaniel B. Shurtleff

Member of the Massachusetts Governor's Council
- In office 1869
- Governor: William Claflin

Chairman of the Boston Board of Aldermen
- In office January 4, 1864 – January 2, 1865
- Preceded by: Thomas Coffin Amory
- Succeeded by: George Washington Messinger

Member of the Boston Board of Aldermen
- In office January 6, 1862 – January 2, 1865

Personal details
- Born: November 2, 1811
- Died: September 5, 1882 (aged 70)
- Education: Miss Davenport's School Boston English High School
- Profession: Crockery Importer & Dealer

Otis C. Norcross (November 2, 1811 – September 5, 1882) served as the nineteenth Mayor of Boston, Massachusetts, from January 7, 1867 to January 6, 1868 during the Reconstruction era of the United States. Norcross was a candidate (1861) for the Massachusetts State House of Representatives; served as a member of the Boston Board of Aldermen from January 6, 1862 to January 2, 1865; chairman of the Boston Board of Aldermen from January 4, 1864 to January 2, 1865; and served as a trustee of the City Hospital, 1865 & 1866; and a member of the Massachusetts Governor's Council, under Gov. William Claflin (1869).

As a politician, he was "very pronounced" in his views; a Webster Whig Party member, with a "most consistent temperance." At the onset of the American Civil War his political views were aligned with the Republican Party.

The sentiment of Norcross' spirit was reflectively shared upon his death:

He brought to our service the sterling qualities which marked his whole character and career. He was a man of great intelligence, of remarkable firmness, and of the highest integrity, never weary in well-doing, and one whose counsel and co-operative, in all the concerns of this Association and of the community in which he lived, were as highly valued as they were cheerfully and generously afforded.

— Hon. Robert C. Winthrop, President, Annual Address, 18 June 1883, Annual Meeting Bunker Hill Monument Association

It is with this in mind, that "[h]is failure to receive the customary re-election for a second-term was due, perhaps, to a certain stiffness of virtue, which in political life at least, seldom receives the reward it merits."

His distant fourth cousin Jonathan Norcross served as fourth ante-bellum Mayor of Atlanta, Georgia, as candidate of the Moral Party.

In his civic life, Otis Norcross was one of the Boston Committee (1871) to relieve sufferers of the Great Chicago Fire. In 1872, while the Boston Fire was raging, he was made treasurer of the Relief Committee. His legacy includes serving as a member of the Water Board (1865) that helped to promote the construction of the Chestnut Hill Reservoir.

== Family ==
Otis C. Norcross married Lucy Ann [Lane] (1816–1916), his first cousin, on 9 December 1835, at the Twelfth Congregational Church in Boston, strict disciples of Unitarianism. His wife was the daughter of George Lane and Sarah Merritt [Homer], married 27 July 1814.

Notable Boston Brahmins, the Norcross family resided at No. 249 Marlborough Street, Boston, adjacent to Boston Common. He later died at the family home, No. 9 Commonwealth Avenue, Boston, and is interred with his family at Mount Auburn Cemetery, in Cambridge, MA.

Otis Norcross, Jr. and Lucy Ann's eight children include: their first four children, all of whom died in infancy: two sons (the first originally named Otis, [III]) and two daughters. Those surviving into maturity included: Laura [Norcross] (1845–1926), married Kingsmill Marrs; Otis Norcross [IV], Esq (b. 1848) (Harvard College, A.B., 1870, Harvard Law, LL.B., 1873), married Susannah Ruggles [Plympton]; descendant of Timothy Ruggles; Addison Norcross (1850–1873; a. 23 yrs.); and Grenville Howland Norcross, Esq (1854–1937) (Harvard College, A.B., 1875, Harvard Law, LL.B., 1877), who resided as a bachelor at the family home, No. 9 Commonwealth Avenue.

== The Norcross Family: Genealogical lineage of a prominent son & relatives ==
The Norcross family is a succession of prominent New Englanders in America deriving from All Hallows Bread Street, London, Middlesex, England, whom upon arrival in the colonies (1638), first settled with fellow Puritans in Salem, Massachusetts, then resettling with the new community in Watertown, Massachusetts, whose progenitor Jeremiah Norcross was a landowner within the town in 1642. The patriarch was married to Adrean [Chadwick].

The family's patrilineal descent of this specific line includes: the second son, of the immigrant's first three children, Richard Norcross (1621–1708), the great-great-great grandfather of Otis Norcross, Jr.

This Norcross blood-line extends further in perpetuity with Otis Norcross' great grandfather Peter Norcross (1710–1777) whose younger brother William Norcross (1715 – ca. 1775), and his wife Lydia [Wheeler] (married 6 Nov. 1741), are the great, great grandparents of Otis' third cousin once removed American poet, Emily Dickinson; daughter of Emily [Norcross] and Edward Dickinson; granddaughter of Joel Norcross and Betsey [Fay]; and great granddaughter of William and Sarah [Marsh] Norcross.

During the American Revolution, the Norcross family "served the cause," whereby [Private Sergeant] Daniel Norcross (1743–1805), grandfather of Otis Norcross, Jr., served in Captain Samuel Warren's Company of the Massachusetts Militia; and Colonel Joseph Reed's Regiment of Militia, Lexington, Massachusetts He married Abigail [Chapin], 3 October 1765, a descendant of notable New England families, including those of: Josiah Chapin (1634–1726), Jonathan Thayer (1658), and Henry Adams (ca. 1582/82–1646), patriarchs of three distinguished colonial families of Weymouth and Braintree, Massachusetts.

Through the Chapin family-line, Otis Norcross is the first cousin fourth removed of the second U.S. President John Adams, and the respective second cousin third removed therefore of the sixth U.S. President John Quincy Adams, as well as, the distant cousin of Brig.-Gen. Sylvanus Thayer, father of the U.S. Military Academy, West Point.

The Hon. Otis Norcross, is the fourth cousin, third removed of Hon. Chester W. Chapin, President of Boston & Albany Railroad, Co.

Otis Norcross, Sr. (1785–1827), married Mary Cunningham [Homer], January 8, 1809, parents of Otis Norcross, Jr. (their second child), and siblings including: Mary Homer Norcross (1809–1885), married Oct. 1830 Stephen Gore Bass, Caroline A. [Norcross], married in 1834 [Hon.] Jonathan D. Wheeler, Esq. Adelaide Norcross (1816–1885), married Nov. 1844 John Warren White Bass,

Mary Cunningham [Homer] Norcross was the elder sister of Charles Savage Homer; father of American artist Winslow Homer. With this, Otis and his siblings were first cousins of the artist. The Homer family, stems from Ettingshall, Warwick Co., England and dates from 1690 in America, having originally settled in Yarmouth, Massachusetts, later removing to Cambridge, Massachusetts. Mary Cunningham [Homer] Norcross was the third born of fourteen children to Eleazer and Mary [Bartlett] Homer.

== Otis Norcross & Co. ==
Otis Norcross, Jr. assumed proprietorship of Norcross, Mellen & Company (est. 1810), upon the death of his father Otis Norcross, Sr. and the subsequent retirement of fellow partner Eliphalet Jones (b. 31 Aug. 1797, Boston), who entered the company as an apprentice in 1811 (r. 1847).

Otis Norcross, Jr., having started with the firm as an apprentice at the age of fourteen, along with his two brothers Addison and D. Webster, and Otis Norcross Jones (b. 6 Mar. 1828, Boston, d. 20 May 1892); son of Eliphalet, and not a relative, at least known, to senior member Jerome Jones,; renamed and shared in partnership Otis Norcross & Co - importers, dealers, wholesalers and retailers of fine European, Japanese and Chinese china, glassware, crockery, earthenware and pottery in Boston.

The company also established a glass factory in Sandwich, Massachusetts.

This partnership also later included Otis Norcross Howland; nephew of Otis Norcross, Jr.; son of his brother-in-law, Ichabod Howland, a business partner at the firm, who was married to his wife's sister, Mary (Maria) Wellington [Lane], a descendant of Mayflower (1621) passenger; John Howland.

The company was sold upon Otis Norcross, Jr.’s retirement in 1867 when he assumed his mayoral duties, upon which time his partner Jerome Jones (apprentice, Jun. 1853; pr. 1861) and Mr. Otis Norcross Howland took over the company as Howland & Jones, Co.

The Company was sold for the final time in 1871 upon the death of Mr. Howland, and renamed; [Jerome] Jones, [Louis P.] McDuffee & [Solomon Piper] Stratton, Co. (Inc. 1896). In 1885 Jones' son Theodore Jones, Jr. (b. 17 Mar. 1866) began an apprenticeship at the firm rising through the ranks to the partner position of Treasurer.

Through several reorganizations since its founding, the company generated substantial wealth for its partners, several of whom became distinguished in Boston's social elite and funded philanthropic institutions in the city.

Proceeding the death of Eliphalet Jones, he became a member of the New England Genealogical and Historical Society, 11 Nov. 1861.

== Brother: D. Webster Norcross ==
D. Webster Norcross (b. 17 August 1826 – d. 1903), the younger brother of Otis Norcross, Jr., married Delia Augustus [Bruce], a direct descendant of Pilgrim Henry Samson, Mayflower (1621). Their granddaughter Abigail [Samson] married George Bruce, whose subsequent grandson, [Capt.] Simon Bruce married Sarah [Whipple], a daughter of James Whipple and descendant of the Whipple family of Boston.

Joseph Bruce, Capt. Bruces’ son, married Harriet [Fay]; whose parents Heman and Martha (Patty) Fay both descend from John Fay, the early Puritan who arrived on the Speedwell (1656) in Boston, Massachusetts.

D. Webster Norcross' daughter, Clara Gertrude [Norcross] (b. 1858, Boston), niece of Hon. Otis Norcross, and a gifted amateur oil painter, married (1883) Melville Oscar Stratton; son of Oscar Stratton and Ellen Amelia [Estabrook] of Sterling, MA, all later residents of Denver, CO., and pioneers of Westward Expansion.

The Stratton family, were original settlers of Watertown, Massachusetts, whose progenitor Samuel Stratton (b. 1592) and his first wife Alice [Beeby] arrived on the Arbella (30 July 1630, Massachusetts Bay Colony) and whose pedigree widely extends throughout the early American colonies.

This Stratton line stems from Gravesend, Kent, England, and includes the original Stratton settlers of East Hampton, Long Island, Suffolk, Co., New York and James City, Jamestown, Virginia; including Winfield Scott Stratton, "the Gold King of Colorado", of the Windsor Stratton line.

Melville [M.] Norcross Stratton, was the son of Melville O. Stratton and Clara G. [Norcross], grandnephew of Hon. Otis Norcross, married (1908) Helen Elizabeth [Hickey], of Grafton, Massachusetts, whose first three daughters Eleanor N., Elizabeth G., and Geraldine F., from a total of six children were the great grandnieces of Mayor Otis Norcross.

M. Norcross Stratton served as President of Massachusetts Board of Education, Vocational Education Society of Boston; and Director Vocational Education [Division], Field of Industrial Schools for Men and Boys, and Agent-in-Charge of Teacher Training in all fields, Massachusetts Department of Education.

== Family tree ==
The following is a selective family tree of notable members of the Norcross family relative to the Honorable Otis Norcross:

Jeremiah Norcross (émigré)	Adrean [Chadwick]
Richard Norcross	Mary Brooks	Joseph Adams, Jr.	(first wife) Mary Chapin	(2nd wife) Hannah Bass
Richard Norcross II	Hannah Saunders	Seth Chapin	Abigail Adams	John Albee (b. 1678)	Debroah Thayer
Peter Norcross	Elizabeth Benjamin	[Lieut.] Josiah Chapin	Rachel Albee
[Prv.] Daniel Norcross	Abigail Chapin	Eleazer Homer	Mary Bartlett
Otis Norcross, Sr.	Mary Cunningham Homer	Sarah Merritt Homer	George Lane
Hon. Otis Norcross	Lucy Ann Lane	D. Webster Norcross	Delia Augusta Bruce (Mayflower descendant)
Otis Norcross (died 1841)	George Lane	Maria Olivia	Lucy Ann	Laura Norcross [Marrs]	Otis Norcross IV	Addison Norcross	Grenville Howland Norcross	Clara Gertrude Norcross	Melville Oscar Stratton
Melville Norcross Stratton	Helen Elizabeth Hickey
Eleanor Norcross [Stratton]	Elizabeth G. [Stratton]	Geraldine Frances [Stratton]	John Stratton	Helen [Stratton]	Melville Norcross Stratton, Jr.

== Tribute ==
The Norcross Grammar School District for Girls (erected: 1867; first occupied: March 1868) (D and Fifth Streets, Boston, MA) was duly named in tribute to the Norcross.

M. Norcross Stratton Elementary School Arlington, Massachusetts

== See also ==
- Timeline of Boston, 1860s
- 1866 Boston mayoral election
- 1867 Boston mayoral election

Political offices
Preceded by Frederic W. Lincoln Jr.	Mayor of Boston, Massachusetts; 1867–1868	Succeeded by Nathaniel B. Shurtleff
