= 1863 Boston mayoral election =

Election in Massachusetts, United States

- December 14, 1863
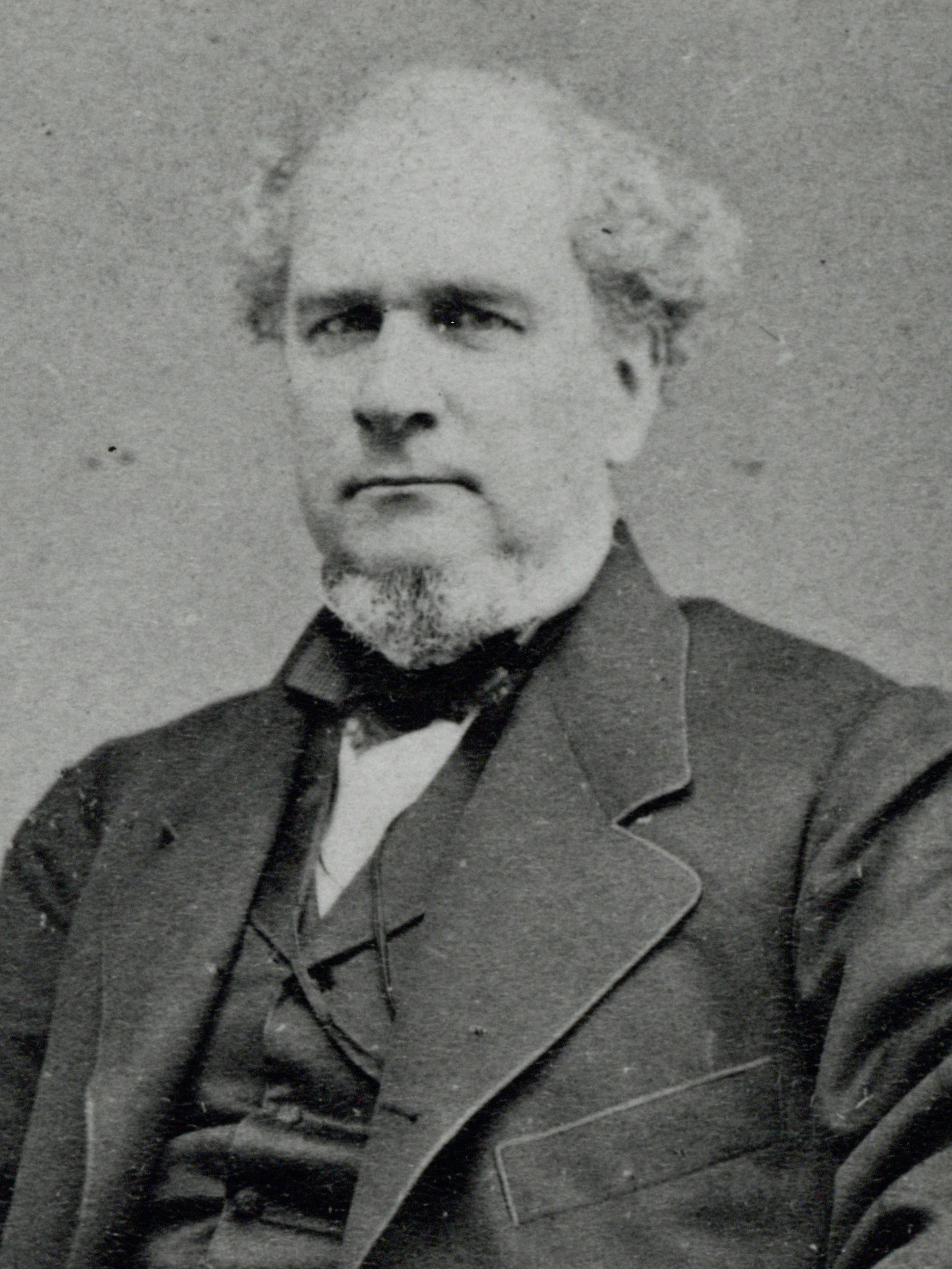

Candidate	Frederic W. Lincoln Jr.	Thomas P. Rich	Samuel R. Spinney
Party	Republican	Democratic	Workingmen's
Popular vote	6,206	2,142	613
Percentage	69.26%	23.90%	6.84%
Mayor before election
Frederic W. Lincoln Jr.
Republican
Elected mayor
Frederic W. Lincoln Jr.
Republican

The 1863 Boston mayoral election was held on December 14, and saw Frederic W. Lincoln Jr. reelected to a fifth overall term.

== Nominations ==
The Republican Party renominated Mayor Lincoln. Thomas P. Rich was nominated by the Democratic Party. Breakaway members of the Democratic Party formed the "Workingmen's" ticket and nominated Samuel R. Spinney.

== Results ==
1863 Boston mayoral election
Party	Candidate	Votes	%
Republican	Frederic W. Lincoln Jr. (incumbent)	6,206	69.22%
Democratic	Thomas P. Rich	2,142	23.89%
Workingmen's	Samuel R. Spinney	613	6.84%
Others	Scattering	5	0.06%
Turnout		8,966	

=== Results by ward ===
	Lincoln (Republican)		Rich (Democratic)		Spinney (Workingmen's)		Others		Top-2 margin (+/− if won by R/D)		Cumulative vote
Ward	Vote	%	Vote	%	Vote	%	Vote	%	Vote	%	Vote
1st	354	45.38	348	44.62	78	10.00	0	0.00	+ 6	+ 0.77	780
2nd	649	74.94	172	19.86	45	5.20	0	0.00	+ 477	+ 55.08	866
3rd	243	45.59	260	48.78	21	3.94	0	0.00	− 17	− 3.19	533
4th	420	83.83	78	15.57	3	0.60	0	0.00	+ 342	+ 68.26	501
5th	520	83.20	91	14.56	13	2.08	1	0.16	+ 429	+ 68.64	625
6th	706	84.15	122	14.54	11	1.31	0	0.00	+ 584	+ 69.61	839
7th	188	40.43	275	59.14	2	0.43	0	0.00	− 87	− 18.71	465
8th	455	75.58	134	22.26	13	2.16	0	0.00	+ 321	+ 53.32	602
9th	480	81.49	83	14.09	26	4.41	0	0.00	+ 397	+ 77.81	589
10th	421	67.25	150	23.96	55	8.79	0	0.00	+ 271	+ 43.29	626
11th	1,145	64.22	235	16.58	33	2.33	4	0.28	+ 910	+ 64.22	1,417
12th	625	55.65	185	16.47	313	27.87	0	0.00	+ 312	+ 27.78	1,123
Total	6,206	69.22	2,142	23.89	613	6.84	5	0.06	+ 4,064	+ 45.33	8,966

== See also ==
- List of mayors of Boston, Massachusetts
