= Nathaniel B. Shurtleff =

American physician

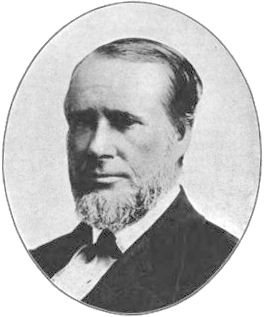

20th Mayor of Boston, Massachusetts
- In office January 6, 1868 – January 2, 1871
- Preceded by: Otis Norcross
- Succeeded by: William Gaston

Personal details
- Born: June 22, 1810 Boston, Massachusetts
- Died: October 17, 1874 (aged 64) Boston, Massachusetts
- Party: Democratic
- Spouse: Sara Eliza Smith
- Education: Harvard College, Harvard Medical School
- Profession: Medical Doctor

Nathaniel Bradstreet Shurtleff Sr. (June 22, 1810 – October 17, 1874) was an American politician, serving as the twentieth mayor of Boston, Massachusetts from January 6, 1868, to January 2, 1871.

== Early life ==
Nathaniel Bradstreet Shurtleff Sr. was born on June 22, 1810, in Boston. His father was Benjamin Shurtleff, a physician.

He was initially educated in the Boston Public Schools system but later transferred to the short lived Round Hill School in Northampton. After graduating, he attended Harvard Medical School and followed his father's footsteps in becoming a physician.

He was a member of the Harvard Board of Overseers.

== Political career ==
Shurtleff, who had been defeated as the Know Nothing candidate for mayor in 1855 and as a Democrat in 1865 and 1866, was elected in 1867 as a Democrat. He won re-election in both 1868 and 1869.

== Mayoralty ==
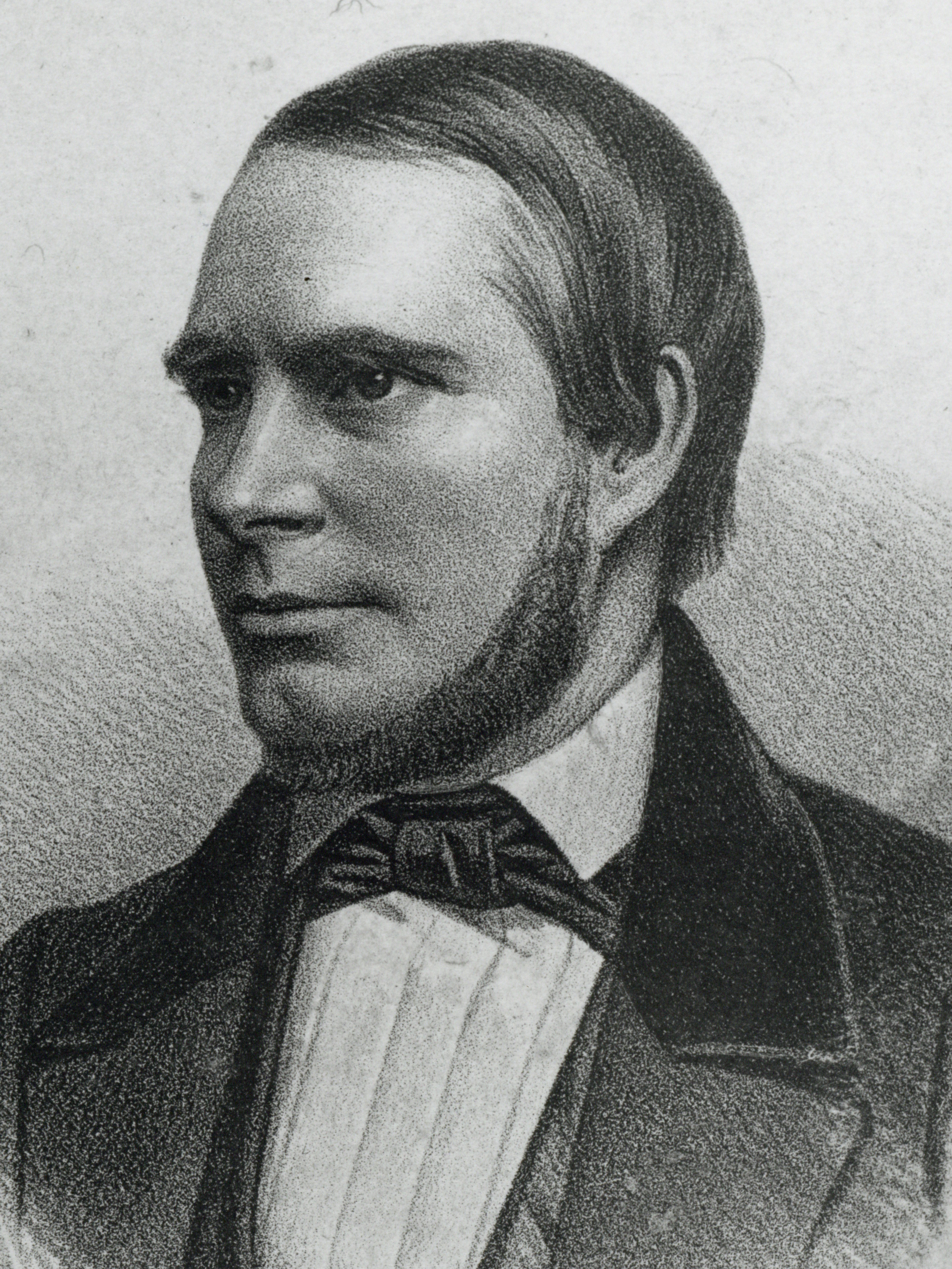
Shurtleff before his time as mayor, undated.

Shurtleff was largely unaware how to run a city; and thus, struggled as mayor. During his mayoralty Atlantic Avenue was laid out, Federal Street was widened, and other streets were extended. The task of laying out streets was transferred from the Board of Aldermen to a board of commissioners during his mayoralty. The city also gained ownership of the East Boston ferries and annexed Dorchester while he was mayor.

== Later life ==
Shurtleff did not run for a fourth term in the 1870 election.

He died on October 17, 1874, at the age of 64.

== Honors ==
Shurtleff was elected a member of the American Antiquarian Society in 1849. He was chosen to serve on the society's board of councilors from 1853 to 1874. In 1857, he was elected to the American Philosophical Society.

== Books ==
Shurtleff is well known to genealogists and historians as the editor of the Massachusetts Bay Colony records (published in five volumes from 1853 as Records of the Governor and Company of the Massachusetts Bay in New England) and of part of the Plymouth Colony records.

- A Topographical and Historical Description of Boston.

== See also ==
- Timeline of Boston, 1860s-1870s

== Bibliography ==
- A Catalogue of the City Councils of Boston, 1822–1908, Roxbury, 1846–1867, Charlestown 1847-1873 and of The Selectmen of Boston, 1634-1822 also of Various Other Town and Municipal officers, Boston, MA: City of Boston Printing Department, (1909) pp. 258–261.
- Mayors of Boston: An Illustrated Epitome of who the Mayors Have Been and What they Have Done, Boston, MA: State Street Trust Company, (1914) pp. 28–29.

Political offices
Preceded by Otis Norcross	Mayor of Boston, Massachusetts; 1868–1870	Succeeded by William Gaston
