= United States v. Students Challenging Regulatory Agency Procedures =

United States v. Students Challenging Regulatory Agency Procedures (SCRAP)
- Supreme Court of the United States

Argued February 28, 1973 Decided June 18, 1973
- Full case name: United States, et al. v. Students Challenging Regulatory Agency Procedures (SCRAP), et al.
- Citations: 412 U.S. 669 (more) 93 S. Ct. 2405; 37 L. Ed. 2d 254; 1973 U.S. LEXIS 20; 5 ERC (BNA) 1449; 3 ELR 20536

Case history
- Prior: Case referred by United States District Court (D.C.) to Three Judge Court (unreported); preliminary injunction issued, 346 F. Supp. 189 (D.D.C. 1972); stay denied (Burger, C. J.), 409 U.S. 1207 (1972); probable jurisdiction noted, 409 U.S. 1073 (1972)
- Subsequent: 371 F. Supp. 1291 (D.D.C.) (on remand). Stay of injunction granted, 413 U.S. 917; preliminary injunction vacated and case remanded for reconsideration, 414 U.S. 1035; probable jurisdiction noted, 419 U.S. 822; Aberdeen and Rockfish Railroad et al. v. Students Challenging Regulatory Agency Procedures, 422 U.S. 289 (1975).

Holding
- Article III "case or controversy" requirement of standing to sue met by members of SCRAP who alleged harm from the adverse effects of a 2.5 percent across-the-board nationwide railroad freight rate increase on materials capable of being recycled approved by the Interstate Commerce Commission (ICC). The Court also concluded that, at such an early stage in the ICC rate-making process, the preliminary injunction enjoining the collection of such freight rates must be set aside pending the preparation of an Environmental Impact Statement under the National Environmental Policy Act of 1969.

Court membership
- Chief Justice Warren E. Burger Associate Justices William O. Douglas · William J. Brennan Jr. Potter Stewart · Byron White; Thurgood Marshall · Harry Blackmun; Lewis F. Powell Jr. · William Rehnquist

Case opinions
- Majority: Stewart, joined by Brennan, Blackmun; Douglas, Marshall (parts I, II); Burger, White, Rehnquist (parts I, III)
- Concurrence: Blackmun, joined by Brennan
- Concur/dissent: Marshall
- Dissent: Douglas
- Dissent: White, joined by Burger, Rehnquist
- Powell took no part in the consideration or decision of the case.

Laws applied
- U.S. Constitution, Article III, Section 2; National Environmental Policy Act, 42 U.S.C. 4321, et seq.; Interstate Commerce Act, 15 U.S.C. 7

United States v. Students Challenging Regulatory Agency Procedures (SCRAP), 412 U.S. 669 (1973), was a landmark decision of the United States Supreme Court in which the Court held that the members of SCRAP—five law students from the George Washington University Law School—had standing to sue under Article III of the Constitution to challenge a nationwide railroad freight rate increase approved by the Interstate Commerce Commission (ICC). SCRAP was the first full-court consideration of the National Environmental Policy Act (NEPA). The Court also reversed the lower court decision that an injunction should be issued at the suspension stage of the ICC rate proceeding. The standing decision has retained its place as the high mark in the Court's standing jurisprudence.

== Background ==
=== Student movement ===
In the late 1960s, Ralph Nader, with the help of law and graduate students, sought to expose disquieting and sometimes corrupting relationships between industry and government regulatory agencies, whose duty was to act in the public interest. Notorious among those relationships were the Interstate Commerce Commission (ICC) and United States railroads. Members of Congress, such as Senators Lee Metcalf (Montana) and Warren Magnuson (Washington), also had exposed the relationship and its harmful effects on American farmers, consumers, and shippers. This public and congressional scrutiny occurred during the tumult of the Vietnam War, especially in Washington, DC, and in the fledgling environmental movement, led in Congress by Senators Edmund Muskie (Maine) and Henry Jackson (Washington). Among the laws enacted was the National Environmental Policy Act, effective January 1, 1970.

Within the George Washington Law School, Professor John F. Banzhaf, to the consternation of traditionalists in legal education, encouraged students to identify problematic corporate and regulatory agency relationships and to engage and challenge them in practical, real terms on their own turf. The five law students (George Biondi, John Larouche, Kenneth Perlman, Neil Thomas Proto, and Peter Ressler) who formed Students Challenging Regulatory Agency Procedures (SCRAP) began their journey in December 1971 with the filing of a petition in the ICC that sought a $1 billion refund for the failure of the commission to comply with NEPA when approving a 20 percent rate increase (after NEPA's effective date) that SCRAP (and others) claimed discriminated against the movement of recyclable materials by favoring the movement of raw materials.

In April and May 1972, SCRAP sued the United States and the ICC in the United States District Court for the District of Columbia for violating NEPA in approving the 20 percent increase (already being collected) and a new 2.5 percent rate increase on all freight transported by all of the nation's railroads. SCRAP then sought a preliminary injunction and a temporary injunction prior to the effective date of the 2.5 percent rate increase.

=== Standing ===
Under Article III, Section 2, of the Constitution, the federal courts' jurisdiction is limited to "cases . . . or controversies." Historically, the court has determined that various requirements must be met to comply with the Article III jurisdictional threshold, without which federal courts cannot consider the case and the wrongdoing alleged by the plaintiff goes forward. Those requirements include, among others, "standing to sue." The Constitution does not identify what requirements must be met to ensure standing; the Supreme Court has developed the requirements over time through its case law. Just prior to SCRAP's decision to sue the United States and the ICC, the Supreme Court had, in Sierra Club v. Morton, denied standing to the Sierra Club in its environmental challenge to Disney’s effort (with the support of the Department of the Interior and Department of Agriculture) to build a hotel and ski resort in California. SCRAP’s claims of wrongdoing and harm to its members were not directed against a single project but against concrete but less discernible harm throughout the nation, including in the Washington, DC, area where the students lived and attended law school.

=== Lower court decisions ===
Under a special statute governing the ICC, a single District Court judge had to decide whether the complaint prepared and filed by the students should be transferred to a three-judge panel appointed by the Chief Judge of the United States Court of Appeals for the District of Columbia (Judge David L. Bazelon). A hearing was held before Judge Charles Robert Richey on a temporary restraining order (TRO). The Environmental Defense Fund (EDF), acting with other environmental groups, sought to intervene by filing its own complaint. SCRAP objected to intervention and the new complaint. Judge Richey allowed EDF to intervene as a party but rejected its separate complaint. The nation's railroads also intervened as a matter of right. The ICC and the United States moved to dismiss SCRAP’s complaint for a lack of standing to sue. The ICC also claimed the court had no authority to interfere in this early stage (characterized as the "suspension stage") of the rate proceeding in part because the ICC retained jurisdiction, although the increased rates could be collected by the railroads. Judge Richey denied the TRO, rejected the motion on standing, and referred the case to a three-judge panel. His decision is unreported but is described in To a High Court: Five Bold Law Students Challenge Corporate Greed and Change the Law.

The three-judge panel consisted of Judges J. Skelly Wright, who presided, Thomas Flannery, and Charles Robert Richey. The United States, the ICC, and the railroads continued to challenge SCRAP's standing and contended that at this stage of the rate process (the suspension stage), a preliminary injunction could not be issued by the court. Following a hearing, the court, in an opinion by Judge Wright, concluded SCRAP had standing to sue. He also concluded that although Congress had vested exclusive jurisdiction in the ICC at the suspension stage of rate-making, Congress had granted the court jurisdiction to review ICC decisions when there was a violation of NEPA. Because harm was imminent and an environmental impact statement was not yet prepared, the nation's railroads were enjoined from collecting the rate increase on recyclable materials. The railroads and the ICC sought a stay of the injunction from Chief Justice Warren Burger, who denied it. The court noted probable jurisdiction at the request of the United States, the ICC, and the nation's railroads.

== Opinion of the Court ==
Justice Potter Stewart wrote the opinion in three parts. In Part II (standing to sue), he concluded that the allegations in the complaint demonstrated that the individual members of SCRAP would be injured by the freight rate increase. Although the complaint contained various allegations of harm, Justice Stewart relied almost exclusively on SCRAP's allegation that each of its members "'[u]ses the forest, rivers, streams, mountains, and other natural resources of the Washington Metropolitan area and at his legal residence, for camping, hiking, fishing, sightseeing, and other recreational [and] aesthetic purposes,' and that these uses have been adversely affected by the increased freight rates…." He determined that although "attenuated," SCRAP's members had "alleged a specific and perceptible harm that distinguished them from other citizens who had not used the natural resources that were claimed to be affected." In Part III of the decision, Justice Stewart concluded that at this early stage of the rate increase review process (the suspension stage) the Court had no jurisdiction to issue a preliminary injunction. Although the 2.5 percent rate increase could go into effect (and the harm SCRAP alleged would occur), the ICC retained jurisdiction to further review the increase. The Court also noted the ICC's intention to comply with NEPA's requirements at a later stage in the proceedings.

=== Blackmun's concurring opinion ===
Justice Harry Blackmun concluded that "in evaluating whether injunctive relief is warranted, I would not require that the appellees, in their individual capacities prove that they were injured. Rather, I would require only that appellees, as responsible and sincere representatives of environmental interests, show that the environment would be injured in fact and that such injury would be irreparable and substantial."

=== Marshall's opinion ===
Justice Thurgood Marshall concurred in Justice Stewart's opinion on standing to sue but also was "convinced there is no lack of judicial power to issue a preliminary injunction against the interim surcharge...." He believed that "[p]roperly viewed ... the injunction at issue in this case amounts to nothing more than a legitimate effort by the District Court, following the Commission’s refusal to suspend the surcharge, to maintain the status quo pending final determination of the legality of the Commission’s action at the suspension stage in light of the requirements of NEPA." He reasoned that "[t]his Court has consistently adhered to the view that it will find federal courts to have been deprived of their traditional power to stay orders under review only in the face of the clearest evidence of a congressional intent to do so…. No such clear intent is to be found in the Interstate Commerce Act…." The ICC also was not entitled to deference because it had special expertise in environmental matters. Consequently, "the grant of preliminary relief here involves no such interference with the Commission’s initial exercise of its particular expertise.... [And] where does the Interstate Commerce Act make provision for an accounting and 'refund' to the people of our Nation for the irreversible ecological damage that results from a rate increase which discriminates unreasonably against recyclable materials and has been allowed to take effect without compliance with the procedural requirements of NEPA?" Citing Scripps-Howard Radio, Inc. v. FCC, 316 U.S. at 17, Justice Marshall opined that Congress "knew how to use apt words" if it wanted to deprive the District Court of its historic power to enjoin agency actions to preserve its jurisdiction.

=== Douglas's dissenting opinion ===
Justice William O. Douglas supported SCRAP's standing for the same reason the majority opinion did. He also recognized the importance of SCRAP's allegation that its "members suffered environmental and economic injury as a result of the alleged increase, because the increase diminished the total amount of recycling in the United States and made those products, which were in fact manufactured from waste materials after the rate increase, more expensive in the marketplace." He also examined in detail the relationship between the railroads’ rate increase and the manner in which – recognized by the President's Council on Environmental Quality and the Environmental Protection Agency – the basic rate structure and the increase discouraged the still fledgling efforts of state and local governments to recycle. Finally, he would have supported the District Court's reasoning that a preliminary injunction should issue to protect NEPA's purpose and thwart the ICC's "technical maneuvers" to avoid it.

=== White's dissenting opinion ===
Justice Byron White would have dismissed the complaint because SCRAP lacked standing to sue: "To me, the alleged injuries are so remote, speculative, and insubstantial in fact that they fail to confer standing." SCRAP's allegation that the rate's effect of "retarding the use of recycled materials, causing further consumption of our forests and natural resources," became, Justice White concluded, "no more concrete, real, or substantial when it is added that materials will cost more at the marketplace and that somehow the freight rate increase will increase air pollution." He compared the allegations to those of taxpayers in Massachusetts v. Mellon, 262 U.S. 447, 486–489 (1923), "or allegations that government decisions are offensive to reason or morals." Justice White also expressed his position that “failure of this country’s railroads even in their present anemic condition will guarantee that recyclable materials will stay where they are—far beyond the reach of recycling plants that as a consequence may not be built at all."

== Subsequent developments ==
=== Effects of the decision ===
The case was remanded to the District Court. The ICC had effectively incorporated the 2.5 percent surcharge into a larger rate increase, including on recyclable materials. The ICC also prepared a draft Environmental Impact Statement (EIS) on the economic and environmental effect of the rate increase. On remand, the District Court found the EIS inadequate and issued a preliminary injunction. Chief Justice Burger stayed the order. The full Court declined to vacate the order, vacated the preliminary injunction, and remanded the case for reconsideration. The District Court, on reconsideration, concluded that the EIS was inadequate and directed the ICC to prepare another one and reconsider its decision. The Supreme Court (per Justice White) reversed the District Court in Aberdeen & Rockfish R. Co. v. SCRAP, 422 U.S. 289 (1975). Justice Douglas dissented. He would have affirmed the District Court decision in large part because of the inadequacy of the EIS and the need to consider NEPA more than "a technical statute of administrative procedure." The United States, the ICC, and the railroads made no further challenge to SCRAP's standing to sue.

Beginning in 1975, the Supreme Court of the United States significantly expanded the requirements necessary to meet Article III standing to sue. With a series of decisions in the 1980s and an alteration in the Court's composition, the notion of separation of powers became the majority's guiding principle in determining standing to sue, often over contentious dissenting opinions.

=== Justice Scalia ===
In "The Doctrine of Standing as an Essential Element of the Separation of Powers," 17 Suffolk Law Review, 881 (1983), then–United States Court of Appeals Judge Antonin Scalia wrote that "the Court's SCRAP-era willingness to discern breathlessly broad congressional grants of standing will not endure." After becoming a member of the Supreme Court, Justice Scalia sought to further expand the requirements of standing to sue and to limit SCRAP's reach.

In Lujan v. National Wildlife Federation, 497 U.S. 871 (1990), Justice Scalia (for a 5-4 majority) concluded that the National Wildlife Federation did not have standing to sue to challenge the Interior Department's reclassification of some withdrawn public lands and the return of others to the public domain in violation of the Federal Land Policy and Management Act and NEPA. With specific reference to SCRAP and NWF's reliance on it, Justice Scalia concluded, "The SCRAP opinion, whose expansive expression of what would suffice ... has never since been emulated by this Court...." Dissenting, Justice Blackmun characterized Justice Scalia's plurality opinion as "what amounts to a slash-and-burn expedition through the law of environmental standing. In my view, '[t]he very essence of civil liberty certainly consists in the right of every individual to claim the protection of the laws, whenever he receives an injury.'" In Lujan v. Defenders of Wildlife (1992), Justice Scalia (for the majority) concluded Defenders did not have standing to challenge a new Interior regulation under the Endangered Species Act (ESA), 1 U.S.C. §1533, 1536. In the opinion, Justice Scalia's criticism of Defenders’ reasoning to support standing to sue included a criticism of SCRAP as being an "ingenious exercise."

In Massachusetts v. EPA (2007), neither side had included reference to United States v. SCRAP in their briefs before the Supreme Court. Sua sponte, Justice Scalia raised SCRAP during Massachusetts's oral argument. The Court, through Justice John Paul Stevens, concluded that Massachusetts had standing to challenge EPA's failure to propose regulations to control greenhouse gas emissions from new motor vehicles. In response to Chief Justice John Roberts's dissent concerning SCRAP, Justice Stevens affirmed the decision on standing in U.S. v. SCRAP. Stevens wrote that "Chief Justice Roberts did not, however, disavow [the] portion of Justice Stewart's opinion for the Court," where he expressed his reasoning to support the standing to sue of the law students. Justice Stevens also added that it is "quite wrong" to analogize Massachusetts's allegations of harm to a "lawyer's game."

Chief Justice Roberts' dissenting opinion was devoted largely to standing. With specific reference to United States v. SCRAP, he wrote that, "Over time, SCRAP became emblematic not of the looseness of Article III standing requirements, but of how utterly manipulable they are if not taken seriously as a matter of judicial self-restraint. SCRAP made standing seem a lawyer's game, rather than a fundamental limitation ensuring that courts function as courts and not intrude on the politically accountable branches. Today’s decision is SCRAP for a new generation."

== Sources and further reading ==
- In general, see Neil Thomas Proto, To a High Court: Five Bold Law Students Challenge Corporate Greed and Change the Law (Friesen Press, 2023). The book's appendix includes the student-drafted amended complaint that provided the basis for the Court's decision. See also https://www.toahighcourt.com/, which includes an extensive photo journal of the time period and participants and some relevant law review articles concerning standing to sue.
- On standing to sue, see Erwin Chemerinsky, Constitutional Law: Principles and Politics, 3rd ed. (Aspen, 2006), 74, 91. See also Daniel Mandelker, NEPA Law and Litigation, 2nd ed., with supplements (Clark Boardman, 2002), section 4.06.
- On standing and the institutionalization of citizens' enforcement, see Zygmunt Plater, Robert H. Abrams, William Goldfarb, Robert L. Graham, Lisa Heinzerling, and David A. Wirth, Environmental Law and Policy: Nature, Law, and Society, 3rd ed. (Aspen, 2004), 395, 406–8).
- On justiciability limitations, see Jerome A. Barron, C. Thomas Dienes, Wayne McCormack, and Martin H. Redis, Constitutional Law: Principles and Policy, Cases and Materials, 7th ed. (Matthew Bender, 2006), 1579, 1589.
- On environmental law, see William H. Rodgers Jr., Environmental Law Treatise, vols. 1–4, with supplements (Thomson/West, 2006).
