= 1855 Boston mayoral election =

Election in Massachusetts, United States

- December 10, 1855
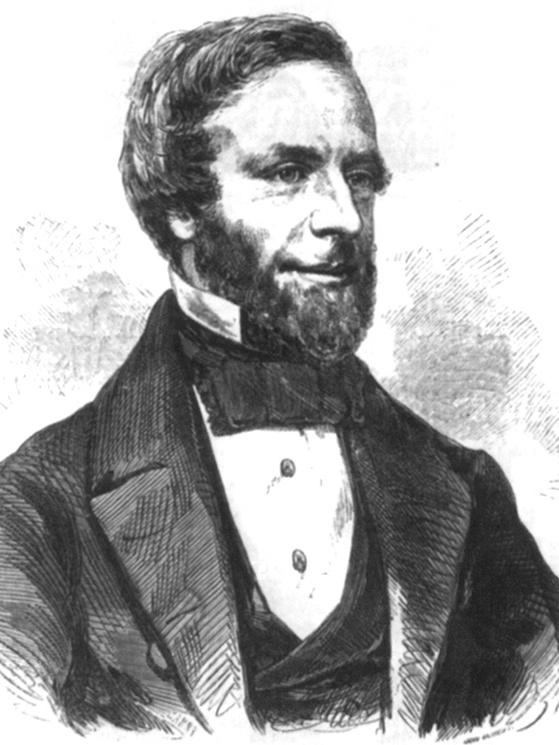

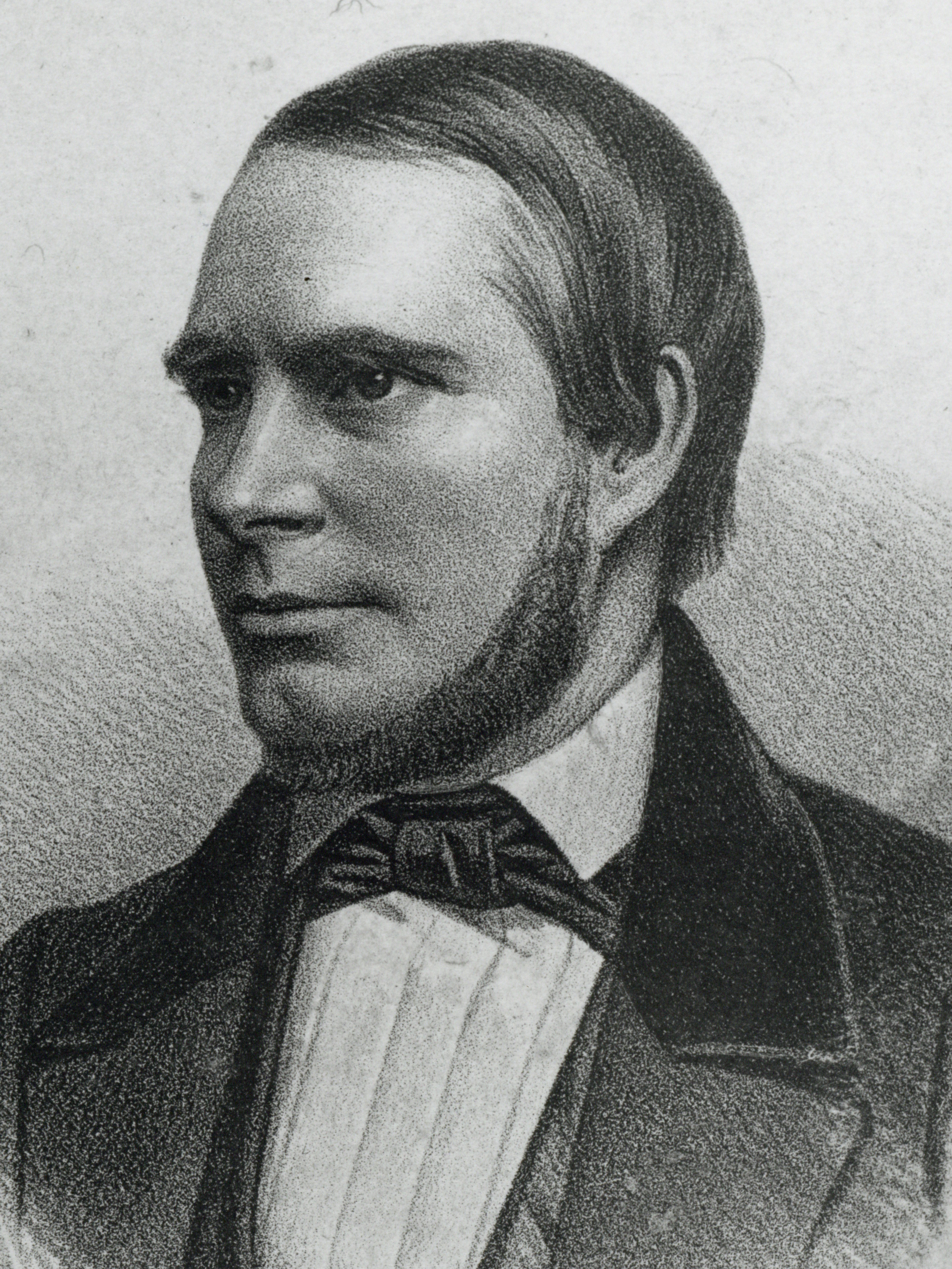
Candidate	Alexander H. Rice	Nathaniel B. Shurtleff
Party	Citizen's slate	Know Nothing
Popular vote	7,401%	5,390
Percentage	57.60%	41.95%
Mayor before election
Jerome V. C. Smith
Know Nothing
Elected mayor
Alexander H. Rice
Independent

The Boston mayoral election of 1855 saw the election of Alexander H. Rice. It was held on December 10, 1855.

== Nominations ==
Alexander H. Rice was nominated by a committee of citizens without a party label. Originally a Whig, at the time, Rice was avoiding associating himself with party organizations. The "Citizen's" slate he ran on performed well in Boston's coinciding City Council elections. Nathaniel B. Shurtleff was nominated by the "American Party" (the Know Nothings).

== Results ==
1855 Boston mayoral election
Party	Candidate	Votes	%
Citizen's slate	Alexander H. Rice	7,401	57.60
Know Nothing	Nathaniel B. Shurtleff	5,390	41.95
Other	Scattering	59	0.46
Turnout		12,850	100

== See also ==
- List of mayors of Boston, Massachusetts
