= Frederic W. Lincoln Jr. =

American manufacturer and politician (1817–1898)

Frederic Walker Lincoln Jr.
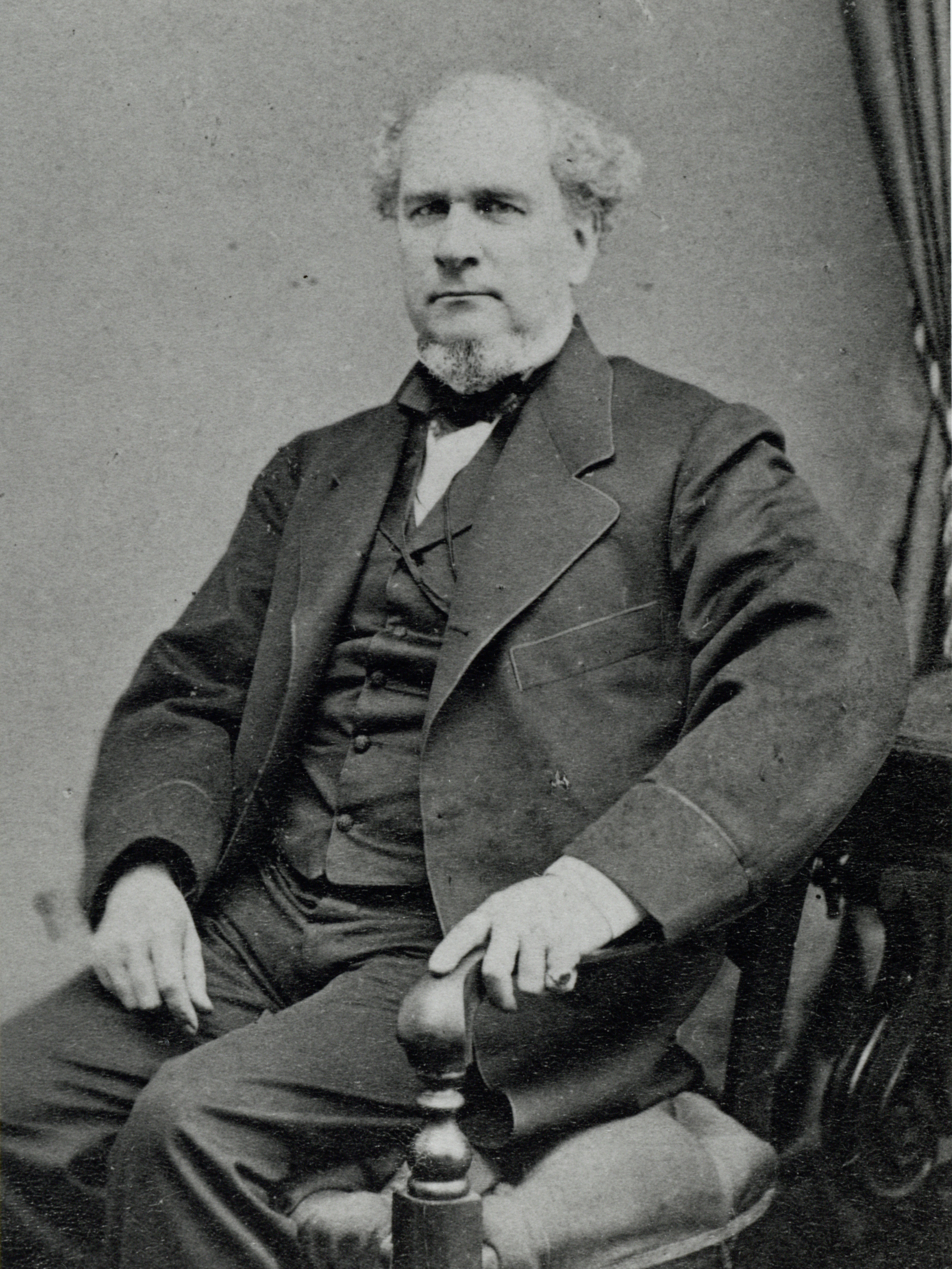

Mayor of Boston
- In office January 5, 1863 – January 7, 1867
- Preceded by: Joseph Wightman
- Succeeded by: Otis Norcross
- In office January 4, 1858 – January 7, 1861
- Preceded by: Alexander H. Rice
- Succeeded by: Joseph Wightman

Member of the Massachusetts House of Representatives from the 6th Suffolk district
- In office 1872–1874
- Succeeded by: John Torrey Morse

Member of the Massachusetts Constitutional Convention of 1853
- In office 1853–1853

Member of the Massachusetts House of Representatives
- In office 1847–1848

Personal details
- Born: February 27, 1817 Boston, Massachusetts
- Died: September 12, 1898 (aged 81)
- Party: Republican
- Spouses: Emeline Hall (m. 1848) Emily Caroline (m. 1854)
- Children: Harriet Lincoln Coolidge
- Occupation: Maker of nautical and surveying instruments

Frederic Walker Lincoln Jr. (February 27, 1817 – September 12, 1898) was an American manufacturer and politician, serving as the sixteenth and eighteenth mayor of Boston, Massachusetts from 1858 to 1860 and 1863–1867, respectively.

== Early life ==
Lincoln was born February 27, 1817, in Boston.

== Career ==
Frederick Douglass criticized him for not protecting, with city police, a December 1860 public meeting in Boston to discuss abolitionism. The meeting was broken up by a pro-slavery mob. On July 14, 1863, Lincoln ordered all 330 officers in the Boston Police Department to quell a draft riot among Irish Catholics attempting to raid Union armories in the North End.

He elected a 3rd Class (honorary) Companion of the Massachusetts Commandery of the Military Order of the Loyal Legion of the United States in recognition of his support of the Union during the American Civil War.

== Personal life ==
Lincoln was the grandfather of Frederic W. Lincoln IV.

He married Emeline Hall on May 18, 1848

He married Emily Caroline on June 20, 1854

== See also ==
- Timeline of Boston, 1860s
- 1857 Boston mayoral election
- 1858 Boston mayoral election
- 1859 Boston mayoral election
- 1862 Boston mayoral election
- 1863 Boston mayoral election
- 1864 Boston mayoral election
- 1865 Boston mayoral election

== Notes ==
Political offices
Preceded by Alexander H. Rice	Mayor of Boston, Massachusetts; 1858–1861	Succeeded by Joseph Wightman
Preceded by Joseph Wightman	Mayor of Boston, Massachusetts; 1863–1867	Succeeded by Otis Norcross
