= 1865 Boston mayoral election =

Election in Massachusetts, United States

- December 11, 1865
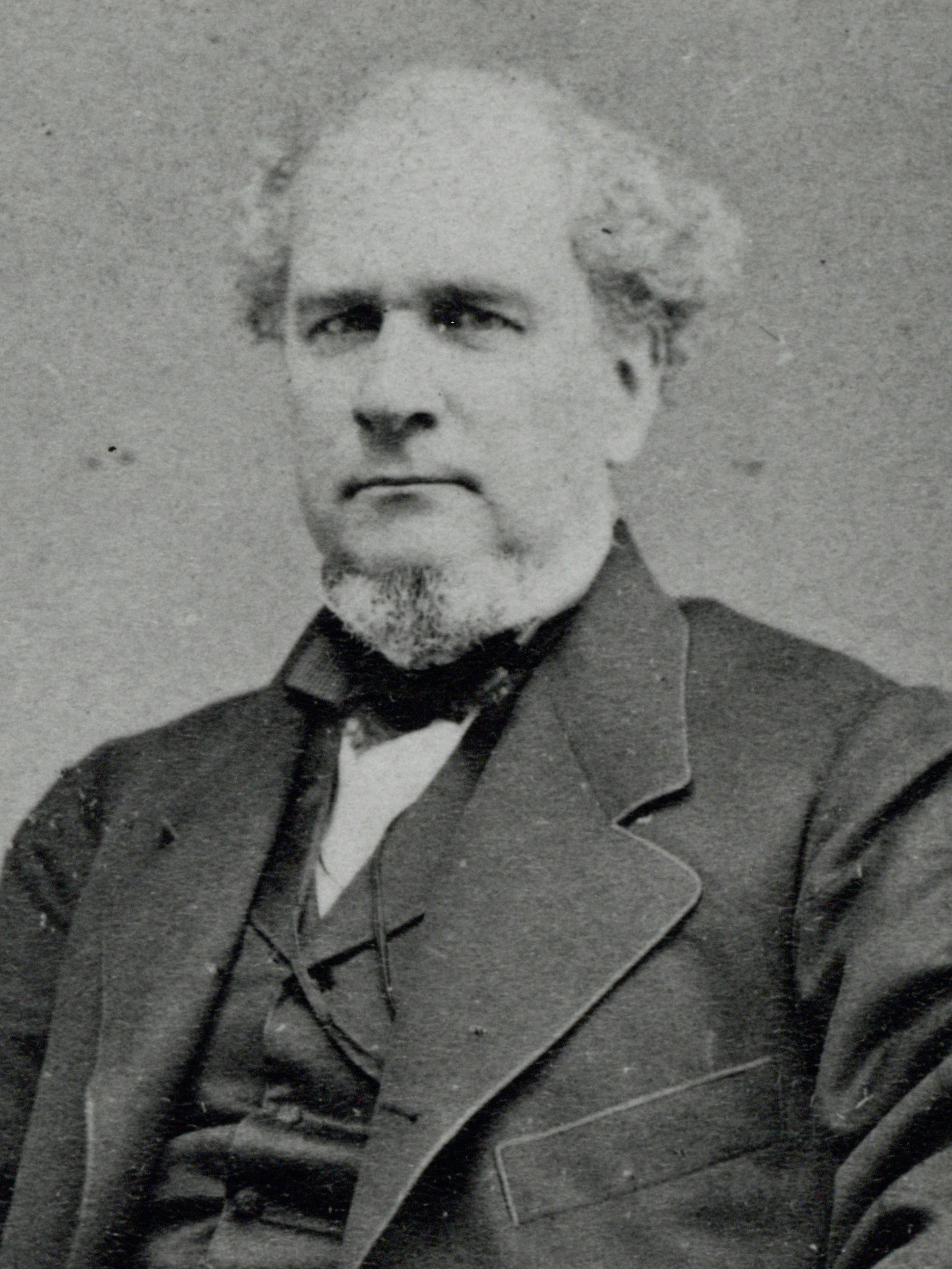

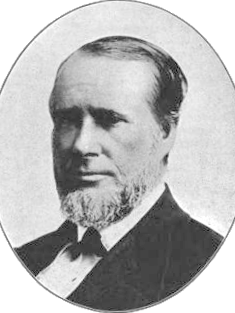
Candidate	Frederic W. Lincoln Jr.	Nathaniel B. Shurtleff
Party	Republican	Democratic
Popular vote	5,806	3,690
Percentage	61.10%	38.83%
Mayor before election
Frederic W. Lincoln Jr.
Republican
Elected mayor
Frederic W. Lincoln Jr.
Republican

The Boston mayoral election of 1865 saw Frederic W. Lincoln Jr. reelected to a seventh overall term.

== Nomination ==
In late-November, Mayor Frederic W. Lincoln Jr. accepted renomination for the mayoralty.

A week before the election, Nathaniel B. Shurtleff was unanimously nominated by the city's Democratic Party at its convention (held at Young's Hotel) after having been selected by the party's Committee of Conference as its recommended candidate. He was also nominated on the Citizens and Workingmen's tickets, the Citizens' convention (held at the Parker House) and Workingmen's Convention (held at the city's insolvency courtroom) both agreeing to nominate identical slates of candidates.

== Results ==
1865 Boston mayoral election
Party	Candidate	Votes	%
Republican	Frederic W. Lincoln Jr. (incumbent)	5,806	61.10
Democratic	Nathaniel B. Shurtleff	3,690	38.83
Others	Scattering	6	0.06
Total votes		9,502	100

== See also ==
- List of mayors of Boston, Massachusetts
