= Julius A. Palmer Jr. =

Botanist (1840–1899)

Julius Auboineau Palmer Jr.
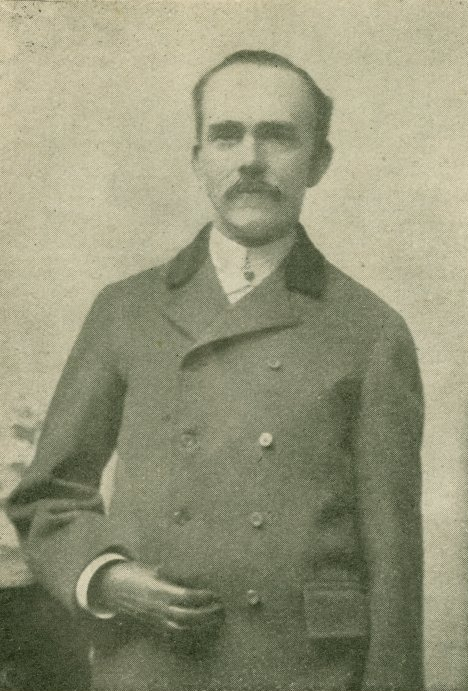
- March 1, 1840 – January 11, 1899
- Born: March 1, 1840
- Died: January 11, 1899 (aged 58)
- Occupations: Ship captain Mycologist (J.A.Palmer); Author
- Known for: Association with Liliuokalani
- Spouse: Effie W.
- Parents: Julius Aboyneau Palmer Sr.; Lucy Manning Peabody
- Relatives: George Herbert Palmer

Julius Auboineau Palmer Jr., (March 1, 1840 – January 11, 1899) was a sea captain and botanist who is probably best remembered in history for his association with Hawaiian queen Liliuokalani. His was born into an old established Massachusetts family that centered around a conservative Christian lifestyle. His father was a successful businessman and politician, one brother a Christian minister, and another brother a professor at Harvard University. As a young man, he chose a seaman's life, visiting much of the world and becoming a multi-linguist. After retiring as a sea captain, he devoted later years to researching the health benefits of edible fungi.

Palmer and Liliuokalani first crossed paths at a diplomatic ball in Honolulu, when he was a sea captain on temporary residency. She was a young newlywed, and he had not yet reached the age of 30. Over the next several decades, their paths continued to cross. An avowed royalist who believed Hawaiians had been the object of missionary bigotry, Palmer was twice sent to Hawaii by United States newspapers to cover the unfolding political events following the overthrow of the Kingdom of Hawaii. His public support of the monarchy put him in the position of being the target of ridicule and harassment by those favoring annexation, which included most of the established newspapers in Hawaii.

After release from her imprisonment, Liliuokalani recruited Palmer as her personal assistant when she was in residence at Boston and Washington D. C., protesting the annexation of Hawaii. He became her official spokesperson, a stenographer and secretary who assisted with her literary publishing, and her staunch ally. She, in turn, referred to him as a man of "unblemished honor and integrity".

== Background ==
He was one of nine children born to Julius Aboyneau Palmer Sr. and his wife Lucy Manning Peabody. The Palmers were descended from English immigrants who arrived in Massachusetts in 1621. The Peabody family were distant relatives who also immigrated to Massachusetts about the same time. Palmer Sr. was a partner in Palmer, Batchelder, & Co jewelers, a deacon in Boston's Mount Vernon Church, treasurer of the Christian publishing firm American Tract Society, and active in many community organizations. The elder Palmer was a Whig Party politician who was elected in 1843 to the Massachusetts state legislature, eventually serving in both houses; in 1858 the Temperance Party of Boston nominated him as their candidate for mayor. Harvard University professor George Herbert Palmer, brother to Julius Jr., described the family life as "a Puritan home". His brother Frederick Palmer was minister of a Congregational church.

Young Julius chose a career sailing the seas, beginning as an ordinary sailor and in succeeding years working his way up the ranks to become captain of his own vessel. The career provided him with sufficient income to retire at an early age. Even in retirement, he maintained his captain's certification. According to the Boston Athenæum, his travels gave him fluency in several languages and took him to many ports around the world. At home in Boston, Palmer gravitated towards socializing with non-English speaking foreigners. In early 1870, he was involved in a lawsuit for his commission on the $10,000 sale of the steamship Kalorama, which he previously commanded. According to his account in The Pacific Commercial Advertiser, he held credentials as Master mariner (professional qualification of captaincy), and had once commanded both the clipper ship USS Nightingale and the Island Home steamer. He held a life membership in the Boston Marine Society and New York American Shipmasters' Association.

He spent a number of years in and out of San Francisco, where he was involved with Chinese immigrants, and wrote to the Boston Advertiser trying to dispel public misconceptions of them as a labor force. In September 1870, Palmer opened a Boston employment agency for Chinese domestic workers.

He was a founding member and president of the Boston Mycological Club. Palmer advocated the consumption of fungus as a healthy food source, and had several articles and two books published on the subject. According to people who spoke with him towards the end of his life, he considered his pioneering research in the field of mushrooms to be his proudest achievement. Palmer engaged in the profession of money brokering to support himself while pursuing his mushroom research.

== Hawaii ==
=== Kingdom of Hawaii ===
His first known visit to the islands was during the Kingdom of Hawaii in the mid-1860s, on a sugarcane molasses buying trip that kept him docked there for about a year and a half. During this visit he was the guest of Hawaii Attorney General Stephen Henry Phillips at a ball held aboard the French frigate Venus, where he first met Liliuokalani and briefly spoke to her as she circulated among the guests. He referred to her in his book as Mrs. Dominis, the time frame of which indicates she would have been a newlywed.

Some people in Hawaii believed that the subsequent series of articles appearing in the Boston Commercial Bulletin, which bore the pseudonym "A Cape Horner", had actually been written by Palmer. The anonymous author criticized the reciprocity treaty efforts, while admonishing individuals by name. Numerous attempts were made during the reign of Kamehameha IV to get a reciprocity treaty as an alternative to annexation with the United States, efforts did not come to fruition until the Reciprocity Treaty of 1875 was negotiated by Kalākaua. In 1871, writing under his own name for The Christian Union, Palmer rebuked the missionaries for what he believed to be practices motivated by bigotry towards the Hawaiian people. The Pacific Commercial Advertiser accused him of, " ... misrepresenting, and defaming us, either willfully or stupidly." In December of that year, Palmer began publishing "A Home Picture" of his Hawaii memories in the Commercial Bulletin. With some sarcastic introductory comments, The Pacific Commercial Appeal ran an excerpt of Palmer's memories, wherein he speculated that Hawaii would never be taken over by the United States.

Liliuokalani and Palmer would meet again in 1887, when both were on the guest list at the housewarming party of Massachusetts Governor Oliver Ames.

=== Provisional Government of Hawaii ===
The January 17, 1893 overthrow of the Kingdom of Hawaii removed Liliuokalani from power and installed a provisional government under Sanford B. Dole, an American born in Hawaii to missionary parents. Palmer visited Hawaii that year and socially met Liliuokalani twice, once in her own home when he was accompanied by Archibald Scott Cleghorn, the father of Princess Kaʻiulani.

The Boston Transcript sent Palmer to Hawaii as an observer to the political situation in February 1894. He immediately agitated people with a letter to The Hawaiian Star stating that he viewed the proposed Republic an unstable prospect. Nevertheless, he was granted an interview with Dole. Allowed to edit his own words before publication, Dole referred to "our forefathers" of the American Revolution and compared the overthrow of Liliuokalani to the actions of Union Army during the Civil War in the United States.

Palmer left Hawaii in March 1894, and published Memories of Hawaii and Hawaiian correspondence, a compilation of his various trips to Hawaii, as well as the Boston Transcript reports. He asserted that only the United States and Russia had recognized the legitimacy of the provisional government. Palmer alleged government censorship of the Hawaiian news media, and stated that the motivations for the overthrow were financial greed and a lust for power.

An anonymous writer at The Hawaiian Star took aim at his qualifications as a journalist, and accused him of misleading the public and the United States Senate. They dismissed him as "that silly Royalist" and suggested he be "kicked in the lobby by one of the pages of the Senate." Presbyterian minister Sereno E. Bishop, ally of Lorrin A. Thurston and the men who overthrew the monarchy, was asked to make a rebuttal to Palmer's book. At the end of the rebuttal, Bishop expressed pride in being exactly what Palmer had accused him of being, a fanatic.

=== Republic of Hawaii ===
A year after the publication of Memories of Hawaii and Hawaiian correspondence, Palmer returned in the employ of the Evening Post. Dole was president of the new Republic of Hawaii. Liliuokalani was imprisoned at Iolani Palace for her alleged involvement in the 1895 Wilcox rebellion, and the government denied Palmer's request to interview her. He kept in touch with her through intermediaries, offering his unconditional friendship and services.

Annexationists attacked Palmer's royalist views, and accused him of falsifying information. The Pacific Commercial Advertiser published Palmer's stated purpose of his visit, but subtitled it "The Skipper Punishes the Public With Egotistical Elucidations". Thurston branded him "the devil's advocate", and Evening Post editor-in-chief Edwin Lawrence Godkin "pope Godkin". When Palmer left Hawaii in May, The Pacific Commercial Advertiser labeled him as the skipper of "The Lying Dutchman", accusing him of searching for "liars and freaks" and using statements "of pure malice and cussedness". In response, The Daily Bulletin of Hawaii branded that editorial a "vial attack" and countered that The Pacific Commercial Advertiser was a paid mouthpiece for the government.

Palmer published his second complication book Again in Hawaii after leaving the islands in June. The San Francisco Call noted its bias against the Republic's government, and its emphasis on restoring the monarchy with Princess Kaiulani on the throne; however, they declined to dismiss Palmer's assertions and suggested a wait-and-see approach to the unfolding historical events.

=== Liliuokalani's assistant and spokesperson ===
According to Palmer, he returned to Boston with an undisclosed "important mission" given him by intermediaries of Liliuokalani. He never revealed the specifics, but said he had accomplished it within six months of his return. Liliuokalani left Hawaii in December 1896 for a visit with her Boston relatives Sara Lee and William Lee, a partner in Lee & Shepard book publishers. It was the first trip outside Hawaii for her accompanying secretary Joseph Heleluhe. Needing an additional assistant familiar with American culture and politics, she requested Palmer meet her at the Boston train station. Her perspective of him was that of a man with "unblemished honor and integrity", and they shared a common vision for a restoration of the monarchy. For the next month, Palmer acted as her personal assistant and refused her offers of monetary compensation for his services. She made his position official on January 22, providing him with a generous salary. Palmer stayed in the job until August 7.

Palmer's responsibilities as her assistant included arranging for tickets in the diplomatic gallery of the United States Senate for the March 4, 1897 inauguration of William McKinley. At her own public receptions, which the queen estimated numbered anywhere between 200 and 500 persons, guests presented their calling cards to Palmer, who in turn introduced each guest.

One of his recurring functions was as a press secretary, giving interviews or submitting lengthy opinion pieces under his name to newspapers. Both methods of disseminating information to the general public reflected the queen's viewpoints, but shielded her by showing only Palmer as the sole interviewee or author. He asserted that since her abdication had been done under threats, it wasn't a legitimate abdication. The Hawaii newspapers reacted sarcastically with attacks on Palmer's character and his spin of history. Some rebuttals were from a frequent contributor to the Washington, D. C. Evening Star under the pseudonym "Kamehameha", a known alias of Sereno E. Bishop in Honolulu.

During May, Palmer acted as a royal escort accompanying the queen's lady-in-waiting Elizabeth Kahele Manawaola St. John (Mrs. Kia Nahaolelua) to California to return to her family in Hawaii. On his return trip, Palmer brought Wakeke Ululani Heleluhe to join her husband Joseph and assume the lady-in-waiting position. Liliuokalani's June 17, 1897 protest against the annexation treaty was witnessed by Palmer, and both Wakeke and Joseph Heleluhe. It was delivered to the State Department by Palmer and Heleluhe. The treaty lay claim to seizing only government land. Author Neil Thomas Proto noted that Palmer stressed in a letter printed in the New York Times that due to a portion of the land recognized as the Crown's private property, Liliuokalani's consent was required for annexation.

On August 7, Liliuokalani and her entourage headed back to Hawaii. At that point, Palmer asked for a leave of absence to return home. By his estimation, she had 5,000 visitors in his time of service. He was her secretary and stenographer, helping to write every letter, note, or publication. He was her literary support in the 1897 publication of the Kumulipo translation, helped her in compiling a book of her songs, and assisted her as she wrote her biography (Hawaii's Story). When interviewed about her in late September 1897, he said, "At any hour that she may call for me, I am ready to hasten back to her service." He was a member of the Massachusetts Reform Club, which passed a resolution on December 18, 1897 declaring annexation of Hawaii "unjust and unwise".

== Aftermath ==
In an interview with The Boston Globe shortly after his service to her ended, he spoke of his employment with her, of his relationship with her dating back to their first meeting, his loyalty to her, and his respect for her. The Globe had subtitled the interview, "Remarkable Statement of the Romantic Relations Existing Between the Ex-Queen Liliuokalani and Her Famous Boston Secretary," but nothing in Palmer's statements suggested a romance existed.

Described in his later years as a short, stocky man with white hair, the personal presentation of Palmer was mentioned in numerous articles over the years. He had a fondness for white suits with brass buttons, or diamond stickpins, in warm weather. When out stalking the wild mushroom, Palmer wore high water pants (slacks with the cuffs above the ankles). In articles published in the United States, writers seemed impressed in how he presented himself. In Hawaii, where much of the media made personal attacks against him, the same clothing and his personal presentation were interpreted as "modest little pansy by the wayside", and "the ladylike little correspondent".

Palmer died at his home in Wellfleet, Massachusetts, on January 11, 1899. He was married to a woman identified as Effie W. Palmer. She pre-deceased him circa 1895, and the couple had no children. Both he and his wife were converts to the Roman Catholic church. After her death, he lived alone, did his own housekeeping and cooking, and cared for himself until the end. The brief obituaries of him mention that he was survived by three brothers: Prof. George H. Palmer of Harvard, the Rev. Frederick Palmer of Andover and Jacob P. Palmer of New York.

== Works by Palmer ==
=== Fungus ===
- "Toad-Stool Eating". The Popular Science Monthly. 11. Popular Science Publishing Company: 93–100. April 1877.
- "How Mushrooms Grow". The Evening Star. Washington D. C. September 27, 1879. p. Image 7 – via Chronicling America.
- "Mushrooms and Toadstools". The Iola Register. Iola, Kansas. October 17, 1879. p. Image 6 – via Chronicling America.
- Mushrooms of America: edible and poisonous. Boston, MA: L. Prang & Co. 1885 – via HathiTrust.
- About mushrooms: a guide to the study of esculent and poisonous fungi. Boston, MA: Lee & Shepard. 1894 – via HathiTrust.

=== Hawaii books ===
- Palmer, Julius A. (1894). Memories of Hawaii and Hawaiian correspondence. Boston, MA: Lee and Shepard – via HathiTrust.
- Palmer, Julius A. (1895). Again in Hawaii. Boston, MA: Lee and Shepard – via HathiTrust.

=== Novel ===
- Palmer, Julius A. (1889). One voyage and its consequences. Boston, MA: D. Lothrop Company – via HathiTrust.
