= Neil Thomas Proto =

American lawyer

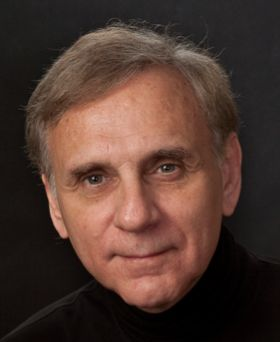
- Born: September 4, 1945 (age 81); New Haven, Connecticut, U.S.
- Education: George Washington University (JD, MA); Southern Connecticut State University (BA)
- Occupations: Lawyer, university teacher, author
- Writing career
- Subjects: Environmental law, cities and urban culture, appellate litigation
- Notable works: Sacco and Vanzetti and the Italian Experience in America (1999); The Rights of My People: Liliuokalani's Enduring Battle with the United States 1893–1917 (2009); The Reckoning: Pecora for the Public (2016); Fearless: A. Bartless Giamatti and the Battle for Fairness in America (2020); To a High Court: Five Bold Law Students Challenge Corporate Greed and Change the Law (2023)
- Website: www.neilthomasproto.com

Neil Thomas Proto (born September 4, 1945) is an American lawyer, teacher, lecturer, and author. He chaired Students Challenging Regulatory Agency Procedures (SCRAP) as a law student. He served in the Appellate Section of the Environment and Natural Resources Division in the U.S. Department of Justice. During the administration of President Jimmy Carter, he served as general counsel to the President's Nuclear Safety Oversight Committee. Proto was appointed a visiting lecturer at Yale University in 1988 and 1989. Since 1990, while in private practice in Washington, DC, he has been an adjunct professor at Georgetown University's McCourt School of Public Policy. In 2010, he was elected a Fellow of the Royal Geographical Society of London. In 2016, his one-person play, The Reckoning, Pecora for the Public, premiered in Seattle.

== Early life and education ==
Proto was born in New Haven, Connecticut, to Matthew and Celeste Proto. Both parents were active in New Haven's civic and political life. His mother emigrated from Italy in 1916. He attended New Haven's public schools. Proto's sister, Diana (1947—), was a Milken National Educator. His brother, Richard Proto, (1940–2008), was director of research at the U.S. National Security Agency. In 2009, a conference center was named in his honor on the NSA campus in Fort Meade, Maryland.

Proto graduated from Southern Connecticut State University in 1967, where he served as student body president and received the university's outstanding leadership award. He was among the early re–ients of college funding from the New Haven Scholarship Fund. He received his Master of Arts degree in international affairs from the George Washington University (GWU) in 1969. From April to June 6, 1968, he served as chair of Young Citizens for Kennedy in Connecticut; then he worked with others to collect signatures for hand gun control. He graduated, with honors, from GWU's law school in 1972. While there, he organized and chaired Students Challenging Regulatory Agency Procedures (SCRAP). His first book, To a High Court, captured the activist imperative and rough corporate culture that surrounded and tempered him and led to United States of America v. SCRAP, 412 US 669 (1973). It was the first Supreme Court case to deal with the National Environmental Policy Act and "standing to sue" under the Constitution. The decision was an acknowledged and enduring bane to Justice Antonin Scalia as well as Chief Justice John Roberts Jr. On September 23, 2023, to mark the fiftieth anniversary of the decision, Proto gave a presentation at GWU about United States of America v. SCRAP.

Proto has donated various documents, photographs, and memorabilia from the 1968–1972 era to George Washington University's Gelman Library. He has also made several donations to Southern Connecticut State University, including funding for the university's prelaw society, a scholarship for aspiring law students, an archive to house the papers of four New Haven mayors.

== Public service, private practice, teaching, and civic life ==
While at the Justice Department (Appellate Section, Environment and Natural Resources Division), Proto litigated cases concerning public lands, environment, and Native Americans. He received the Department's Special Commendation Award for Outstanding Service and the Division's Award for Meritorious Service. In 1979, Proto returned to New Haven. In January 1980, he served as co-chair of the first mayoral inauguration held at Yale University. The inauguration, held in Woolsey Hall, included the president of Yale, A. Bartlett Giamatti, and Connecticut governor Ella T. Grasso. Proto wrote about the event in his book about Giamatti, Fearless: A. Bartlett Giamatti and the Battle for Fairness in America. He has also written articles and a podcast about Giamatti's decision as commissioner of Major League Baseball to banish Pete Rose. Proto was elected to the board of directors of the Long Wharf Theater, and served on the board of directors of the Shubert Theatre (New Haven). In 1981, Proto received the Distinguished Alumnus Award from Southern Connecticut State University. He had given the Commencement Address in 1976.

In 1981, Proto returned to Washington, D.C., where he served as general counsel to President Jimmy Carter's Nuclear Safety Oversight Committee (NSOC). Proto also has written about the corporate and government failure to ensure nuclear safety.

From 1983 to 1989, Proto entered private practice in New Haven. He represented the city and state in various constitutional and environmental litigation in Washington, D.C.; Connecticut; and New York. Proto was appointed a visiting lecturer at Yale College in 1988 and 1989, where he taught the history and law of nuclear power.

Proto returned to Washington, D.C., to join Verner Liipfert Bernhard McPherson & Hand and begin teaching at Georgetown University's Public Policy Institute (now the McCourt School of Public Policy). He represented, pro bono, the National Trust for Historic Preservation and Protect Historic America (involving such authors as David McCullough, James Alan McPherson, and Pulitzer Prize-winning journalist Nick Kotz) in their successful effort to stop Disney from building a theme park in Virginia. He drafted a unique statutory scheme at the behest of the State of Hawaii that resulted in the conveyance of Kaho'olawe Island from the United States to Hawaii for the special use of Native Hawaiians. His work led, in part, to the publication of his second book, The Rights of My People: Liliuokalani's Enduring Battle with the United States, 1898 to 1917. The book explored the skilled and courageous efforts of former queen Liliuokalani on the continental United States to regain one million acres of land taken in the 1898 annexation by the United States. Proto also focused on the disquieting role played by lawyers. In December 2013, he donated the Rights of My People papers to the University of Hawaii Law School.

In 2002, Proto became a partner at Schnader Harrison Segal & Lewis. In 2004, he was elected to the board of directors of the Roosevelt Institute for a three-year term. In the summer of 2004, he served as counsel to Congresswoman Rosa DeLauro (D-Conn.) in her capacity as chair of the Democratic Party Platform Drafting Committee. He served as chair (1995–2010) of the American Friends of Wilton Park, a British-American educational organization with origins in World War II. In 2010, he served as a senior adviser to the United States Naval Academy's Foreign Affairs Conference on "National Security Beyond the Horizon: Changing Threats in a Changing World." Later that year, he was elected a Fellow in the Royal Geographical Society.

== Selected writings ==
Proto's articles have been published in various newspapers, magazines, and journals. From 1997 to 2002, Proto undertook an examination of the lives of Bartolomeo Vanzetti and Nicola Sacco and the cultural and legal setting for their 1921 trial and 1927 execution. In 2002, with the support of Mayor John DeStefano Jr. and Congresswoman Rosa DeLauro, Proto served as chair of New Haven's year-long commemoration of the seventy-fifth anniversary of the execution. Proto also co-adapted from the original Dutch (with director Tony Giordano) the musical drama, The American Dream: The Story of Sacco and Vanzetti. It was performed at the Shubert Theatre (New Haven) in 2002. In the preface to Sacco and Vanzetti and the Italian Experience in America, which encompasses the history and persons involved in this almost seven-year inquiry and literary effort, Proto wrote the following: "This body of work has reflected my intention to encourage a colloquy about the meaning and effects among Italian immigrants and Italian Americans of the fight for the lives of Bartolomeo Vanzetti and Nicola Sacco. It was not a lonely journey. From the outset, numerous people engaged thoughtfully and, at times, provocatively in such a colloquy…. Raw, often dormant, experiences and recollections emerged with a comfort not previously allowed or accepted. Memories among the elderly had been seared by the lives of Vanzetti and Sacco."

Proto's recent writings include a work of short fiction, Absent in Body, Present in Spirit, as well as works on his adventurous exploits with friends in the Northwest and book reviews on Louis Brandeis and T. E. Lawrence.

In 2016, Proto's one-person play on the 1933 U.S. Senate hearings into the causes of the 1929 stock market crash, The Reckoning: Pecora for the Public, premiered in Seattle. A reviewer said: "Possibly it is the best solo play ever written."

Proto's 2020 book, Fearless: A. Bartlett Giamatti and the Battle for Fairness in America, explores the early years of the Italian American professor of Renaissance literature who would later become Yale's first non-Anglo-Saxon president and the commissioner of Major League Baseball. The book received the 2020 bronze award in the Biography category of the Foreword Reviews INDIES Book of the Year Awards.

In 2023, an expanded edition of To a High Court was published with a new subtitle: Five Bold Law Students Challenge Corporate Greed and Change the Law. The release coincided with the fiftieth anniversary of the decision in United States of America v. SCRAP, 412 US 669 (1973), which is the subject of the book. The book contained additional biographical information and photographs. It received first prize in the 2024 PenCraft Book Awards in the Nonfiction–Government/Politics genre. The book also received the Nonfiction Authors Book Award, was first runner-up in the Culture category, and was a Grand Prize finalist in the 2024 Eric Hoffer Awards, and it was a finalist in the Biography category in the 2023 INDIES.

In 2025, Proto published Johannes Vermeer, Provocateur—Risk and Courage in Dissent with FriesenPress. The book received first place in the category of Historical and Cultural Nonfiction in the 2026 PenCraft Awards for Literary Excellence.

== Current interests ==
Proto is a member of the District of Columbia Bar and the United States Supreme Court Bar. His peers recognize him for exceptional ethical conduct and legal skill. He continues to reside in Washington, D.C., occupied by writing, teaching, and exploring new creative threads. His interests frequently take him abroad to Royal Geographical Society conferences and events; to the Pacific Northwest for hiking, sailing, kayaking, and snowshoeing; and to the northeastern United States to maintain ties with family members and friends.
