= Back Bay Fens =

Parkland in Boston, Massachusetts

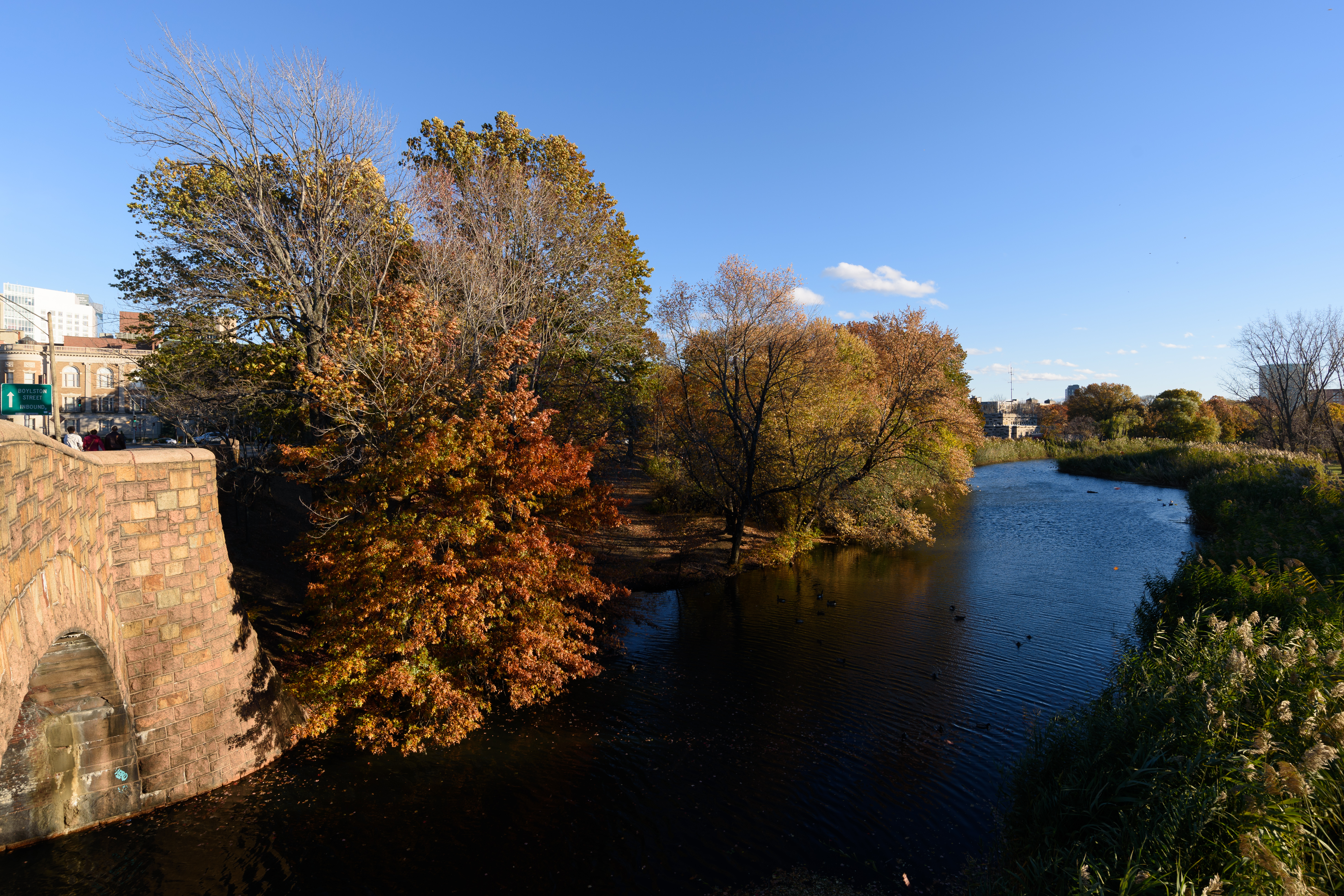
- The Back Bay Fens viewed from the Boylston Street bridge
- Interactive map of Back Bay Fens
- Location: Fenway–Kenmore, Boston
- Coordinates: 42.3423°N 71.0935°W
- Created: 1879
- Designer: Frederick Law Olmsted
- Olmstead Park System
- U.S. National Register of Historic Places
- Boston Landmark
- NRHP reference No.: 71000086
- Designated BOSL: November 11, 1983

The Back Bay Fens, often simply referred to as "the Fens," is a parkland and urban wild in Boston, Massachusetts, United States. It was established in 1879. Designed by Frederick Law Olmsted to serve as a link in the Emerald Necklace park system, the Fens gives its name to the Fenway–Kenmore neighborhood.

== History ==
The Fens is a large picturesque park that forms part of Boston's Emerald Necklace. It is essentially an ancient spot of saltwater marshland that has been surrounded by dry land, disconnected from the tides of the Atlantic Ocean, and landscaped into a park with fresh water within. The park is also known as the Fens or the Fenway. The latter term can also refer to either the surrounding neighborhood or the parkway on its southern border.

When Boston was settled in the early 17th century the Shawmut Peninsula on which it was built was connected to Roxbury by a spit of sandy ground called "The Neck." The adjacent area of marshland to the west was a tidal flat of the Charles River. The area became malodorous with time as it became tainted with sewage from the growing settlement.

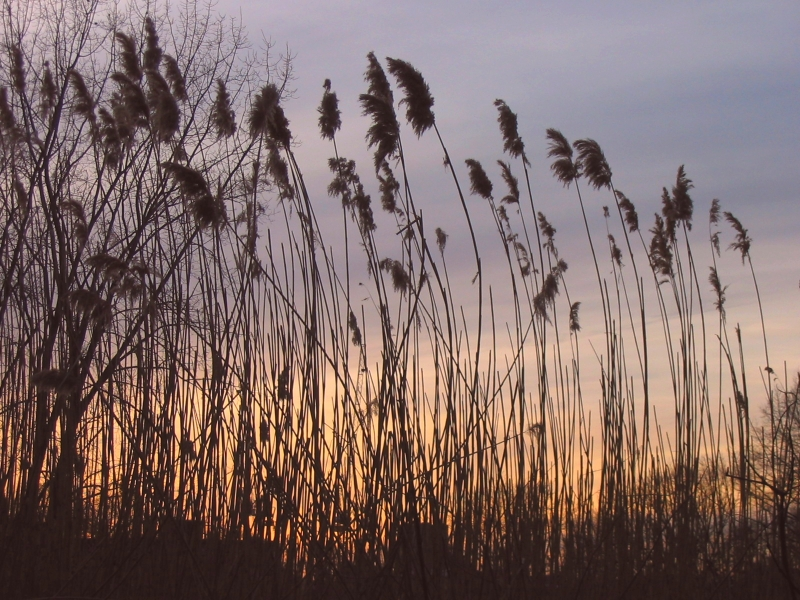
Sunset in the Fens viewed through Phragmites australis, a non-native reed. These are considered an invasive species by the US Army Corps of Engineers, which has applied for funds to remove them.

For the dual purpose of eliminating the health and aesthetic problem created by the polluted bay waters and creating new and valuable Boston real estate, a series of land reclamation projects was begun in 1820 and continued for the rest of the century. The filling of present-day Back Bay was completed by 1882. Filling reached Kenmore Square in 1890 and finished in the Fens in 1900. These projects more than doubled the size of the Shawmut Peninsula.

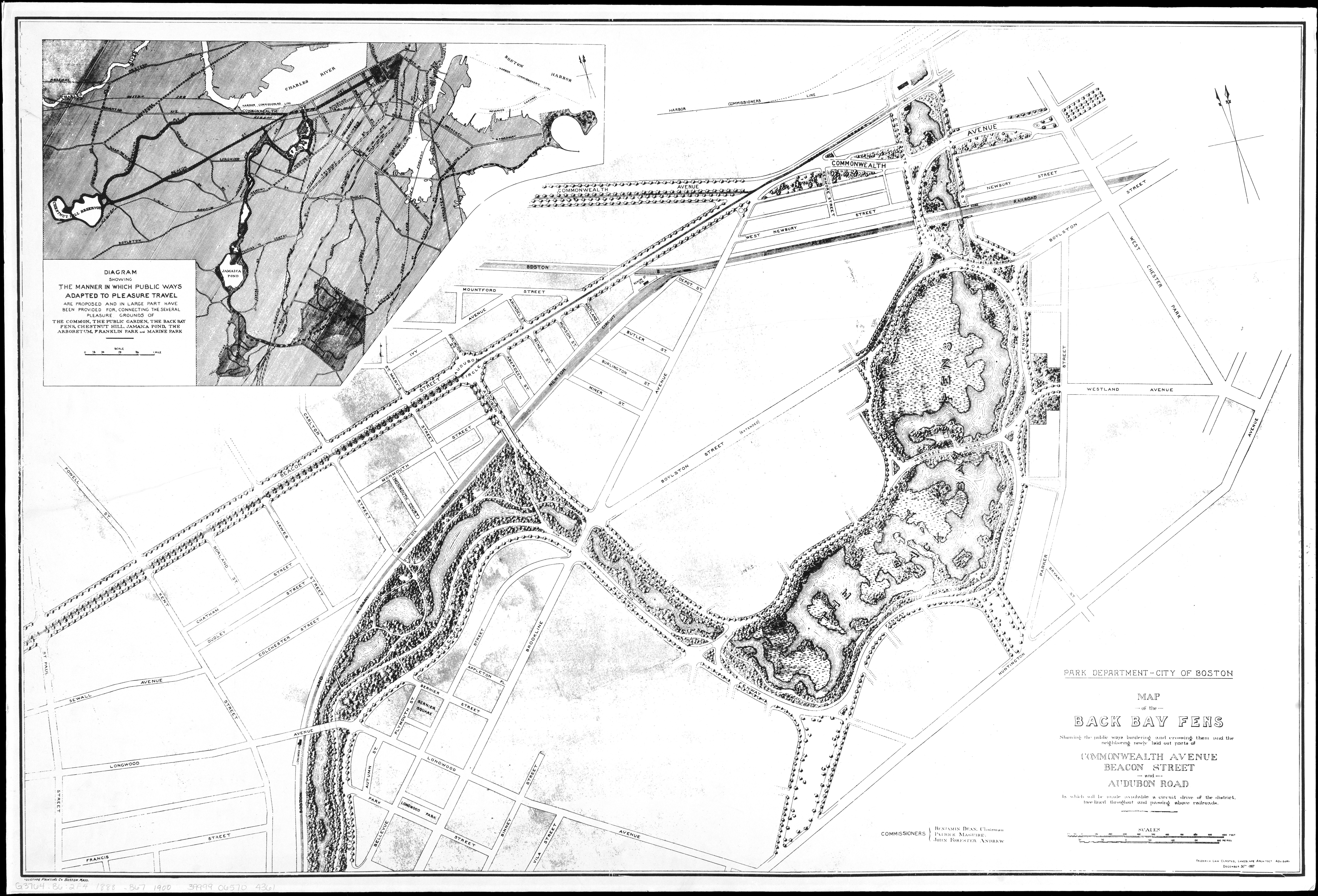
Olmsted's 1887 plan for the Fens

Olmsted's challenge was to restore the spot of marsh which was preserved into an ecologically healthy place that could also be enjoyed as a recreation area. Combining his renowned landscaping talents with state-of-the-art sanitary engineering, he turned a foul-smelling tidal creek and swamp into "scenery of a winding, brackish creek, within wooded banks; gaining interest from the meandering course of the water."

Olmsted designed the Fens to be flushed by the tides twice daily. However, in 1910 a dam was constructed at Craigie's Bridge, closing the Charles River estuary to the ocean tides and forming a body of freshwater above the dam. Thus, the Fens became a freshwater lagoon regularly accepting storm water from the Charles River Basin.

Soon after, noted landscape architect Arthur Shurcliff, a protégé of Olmsted, added new features such as the Kelleher Rose Garden and employed the more formal landscape style popular in the 1920s and 1930s. An athletic field was also added.

In 1941, at the outbreak of United States involvement in World War II, citizens planted a victory garden within the Fens. While these were common in their era, the one in the Fens is now the last continually operating Victory Garden in existence and today is a much-valued community garden of flowers and vegetables.

In 1983, the Back Bay Fens were designated as a Boston Landmark.

The Emerald Necklace Conservancy is headquartered in the park and operates a year-round visitor center.

== Features ==
=== Entrances ===
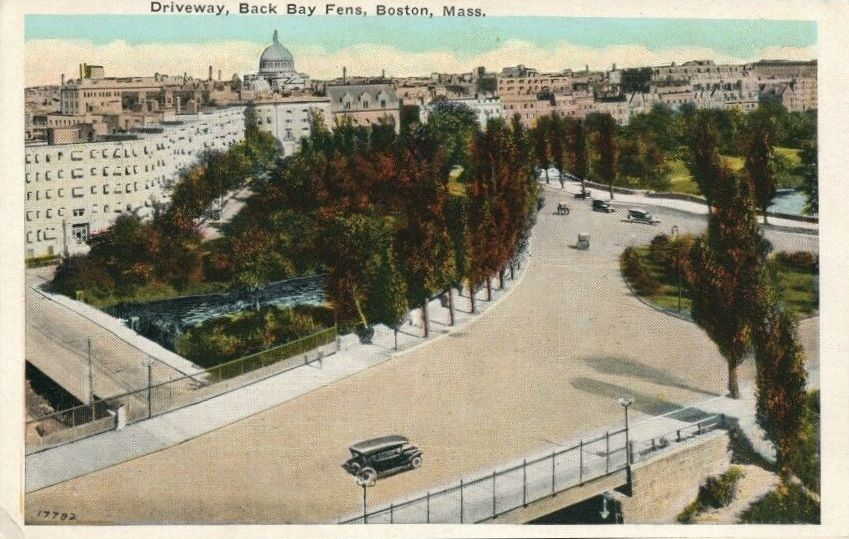
The bridge at the Beacon Entrance on an early postcard, c. 1915–1930

The Back Bay Fens was designed with six entrances, with straight roads and formal lawns that contrasted with the more wild Fens.

The original main entrance was the Beacon Entrance, running from Beacon Street to Boylston Street, bounded by Charlesgate East and Charlesgate West. A crescent-shaped bridge crossed over the Boston and Albany Railroad, connecting the Commonwealth Avenue Mall with the Fens at Gaston Square. The entrance has been wholly modified, beginning with the addition of a bridge for the Ipswich Street line in 1898. A bust of Patrick Collins was added shortly after the mayor's 1905 death. The Charles River Esplanade, completed in 1910, connected with the Beacon Street end of the entrance. The bridge carrying Commonwealth Avenue was replaced with two bridges for separated eastbound and westbound traffic in 1917. Storrow Drive was built along the Esplanade in 1951–55, severing the connection with the Beacon Entrance. The construction of the Massachusetts Turnpike Extension in the 1960s caused the removal of the curved bridge, separating the entrance (now Charlesgate Park) from the rest of the Fens. It was replaced with the Bowker Overpass, which overshadows the remaining parkland; the Muddy River was moved to a small side channel, and the bust was relocated east along the Mall. Isolated from the Fens, Charlesgate was included with the Commonwealth Avenue Mall in its 1978 Boston Landmark designation.

The Boylston entrance is located just southeast of the Beacon Entrance, where Boylston Street meets the Fenway. A statue of John Boyle O'Reilly was added in the triangular center of the junction in 1894. The intersection was rebuilt in 1982, with the statue relocated into the park.

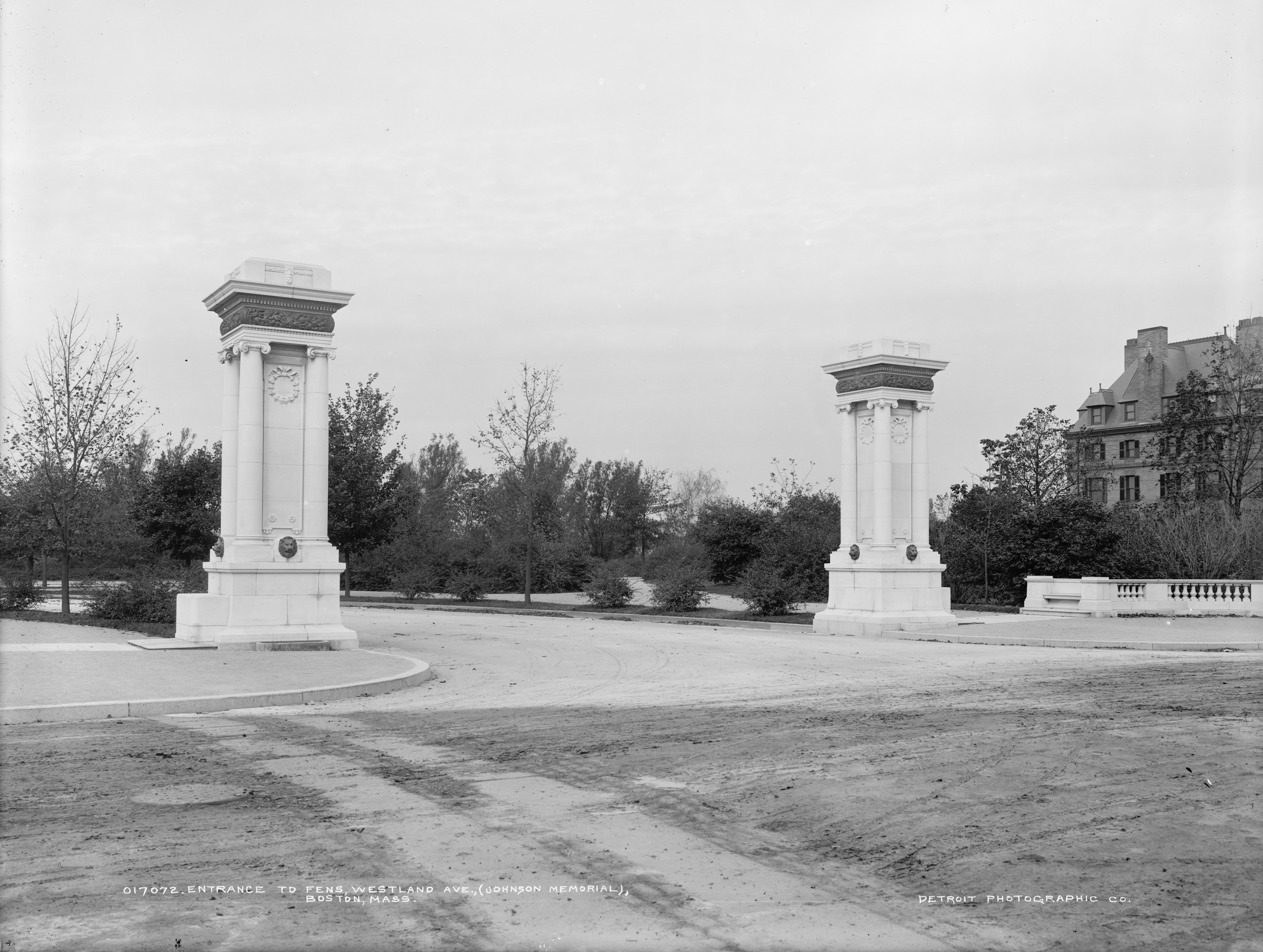
Westland Gate shortly after its completion

The Westland Entrance is on the east side of the Back Bay Fens, with lawns lining a block of Westland Avenue between the Fenway and Hemenway Street. Westland Gate, a pair of marble monuments with lion's-head fountains feeding horse troughs on the side, frames the entrance. It was designed by Guy Lowell and funded by Ellen Cheney Johnson as a memorial to her husband. Westland Gate was completed around 1905, at which time it replaced the Beacon Entrance as the main entrance to the Fens.

The Huntington Entrance runs along Forsyth Way from Huntington Avenue to the Fenway on the south side of the Fens, just east of the Museum of Fine Arts. As originally laid out by Olmsted, it had twin roadways framing a canal that carried the Stony Brook into the Muddy River, with a bridge carrying the Fenway and paths over the brook. The entrance was rebuilt several times as the Stony Brook was placed in conduits; the canal was filled in 1905 and the bridge demolished.

The Tremont Entrance is a wide formal lawn on the southwest corner of the Fens. It originally ran to the Fenway from Huntington Avenue at Longwood Avenue, in the direction of Tremont Street. Initial plans called for it to continue as a parkway to Tremont Street and over Parker Hill, but high lands prices prevented that design. The Emerald Necklace and its parkways were instead built along the Muddy River, and the Tremont Entrance was only built to Huntington Avenue. The Huntington end of the entrance was "obliterated" by expansion of Boston State College (now occupied by the Massachusetts College of Art and Design) in the 1960s and 1970s. The remaining section north of Tetlow Street is now Evans Way Park. The park and eponymous street were named for Robert Evans, whose wife Marie Antoinette Evans funded a new wing of the Museum of Fine Arts in 1915 in his memory.

The Longwood Entrance follows the Muddy River from Brookline Avenue at the west end of the Fens. Narrower than the main section of the Fens, the Longwood Entrance connects it to the Riverway. Roadway widenings in the 1950s covered over much of the river between Avenue Louis Pasteur and Brookline Avenue. Phase 1 of the Muddy River Restoration Project, which lasted from 2013 to 2016, daylit this section of the river and restored much of the former Longwood Entrance. The section between the Riverway and Avenue Louis Pasteur (including the former Longwood Entrance) was renamed as Justine Mee Liff Park in 2013, honoring a former Boston Parks and Recreation Commissioner. The park opened in April 2017.

=== Bridges ===
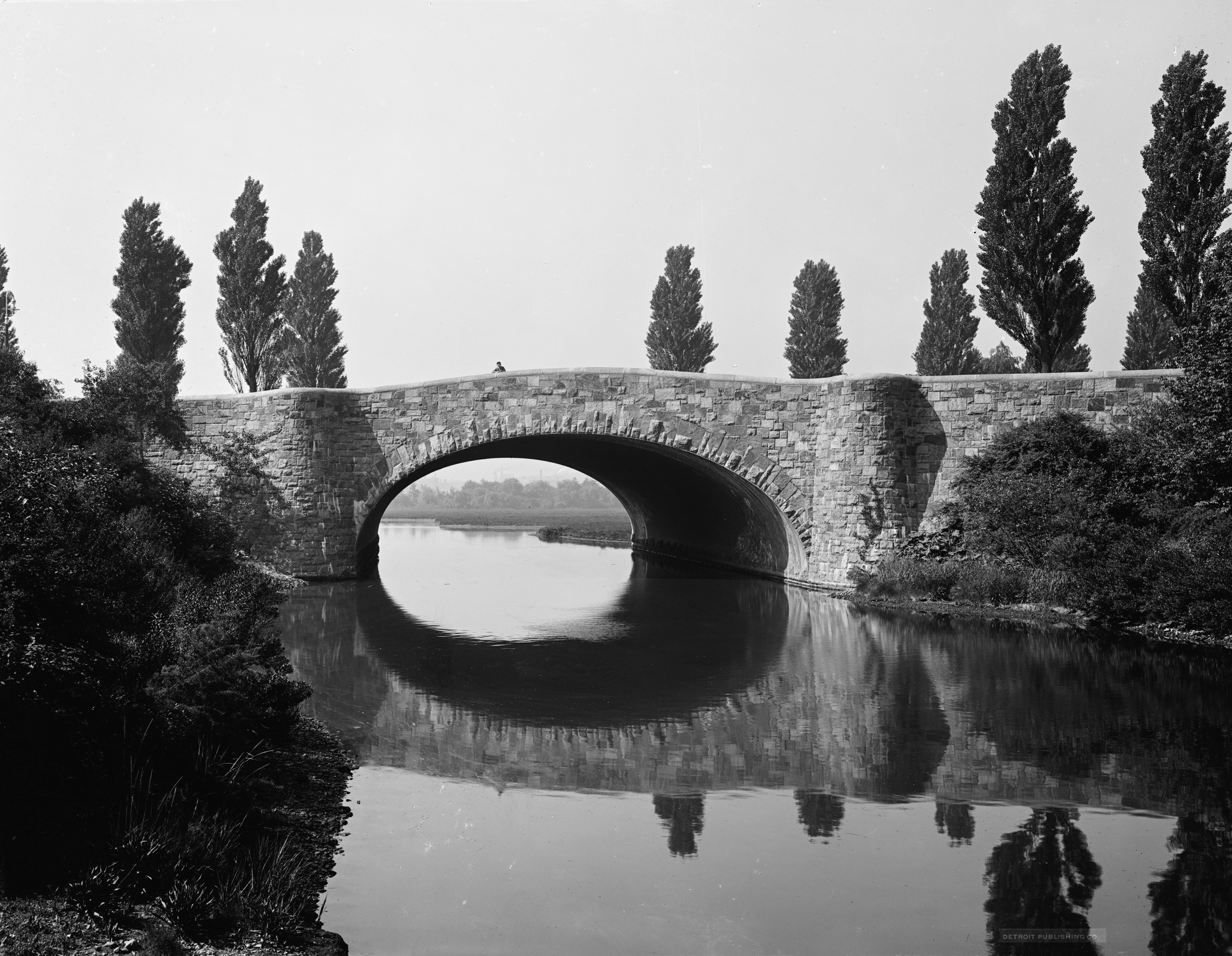
The Boylston Street bridge in the 1890s

Within the main section of the Back Bay Fens (Boylston Street to Avenue Louis Pasteur), three road bridges and two footbridges cross the Muddy River. The road bridges were designed by John C. Olmsted, Frederick Law Omlsted's adopted son. The largest and most significant is the Boylston Street bridge, designed as a "brilliant collaboration" between architect Henry Hobson Richardson (a frequent Olmsted collaborator) and the Olmsted firm. John Olmsted designed the main stone arch span, while Richardson added the tourelles flanking the arch. The foundation and abutments were built in 1880, though Richardson did not submit his design until July 1881. Cape Ann granite was not chosen as the material that December; although Richardson preferred rough boulders, seam-faced rock was used. The arch was constructed in 1883, and the bridge opened in 1884. The bridge was "totally different from any other masonry bridge of its day", and Shepley, Rutan and Coolidge applied its scale and materials to later structures along the Emerald Necklace.

The Agassiz Road bridge, which connects Park Drive and the Fenway through the middle of the Fens, was designed by John Olmsted. It has five small brick arches, with granite abutments and piers supported by spruce piles driven into the marsh. The bridge is faced with Roxbury puddingstone salvaged from old walls in Franklin Park. Construction began in 1887 and was completed in February 1888; parapets were added when the road was paved in 1891.

The Fen Bridge connects Park Drive and the Fenway at the west end of the Fens opposite Avenue Louis Pasteur. Also designed by John Olmsted, it is a masonry arch with a 15-foot (4.6 m) span. Like the Agassiz Road bridge, its abutments are granite supported by spruce piles and the facing is reused Roxbury puddingstone. Construction lasted from February to November 1891; the bridge opened with Audubon Road (now Park Drive) on January 3, 1892. The cost of the bridge was $27,699 (equivalent to $895,000 in 2025). The triangular median at the south end of the bridge was designated Higginson Circle after Henry Lee Higginson in 1920. The west parapet was removed in the 1950s when the Muddy River was culverted through the Longwood Entrance.

A pair of footbridges are located on opposite sides of the Museum of Fine Arts: one across from Forsyth Way, the other north of Museum Road. They were built in the 1920s (the Forsyth Way bridge replacing an earlier crossing) as part of Arthur Shurcliff's reconfiguration of The Fens, and rebuilt as concrete bridges with granite facing in 1979. A third footbridge at Evans Way existed in the early 20th century, but was gone by 1915. A replacement was designed during the 1920s work and finally built in 1939. The bridge was disassembled in 1979 with the other footbridges, but it was never rebuilt, possibly due to funding shortfalls created by Proposition 2½.

North from Boylston Street in Charlesgate Park, the Muddy River is crossed by Ipswich Street, the Worcester Main Line railroad bridge, the Massachusetts Turnpike, two bridges carrying Commonwealth Avenue, Beacon Street, and Storrow Drive, as well as the elevated Bowker Overpass and its ramps. The west border of the Fens (where it meets the Riverway) is Brookline Avenue, which crosses the Muddy River on a wide bridge completed in 2016.

=== Former bridges ===
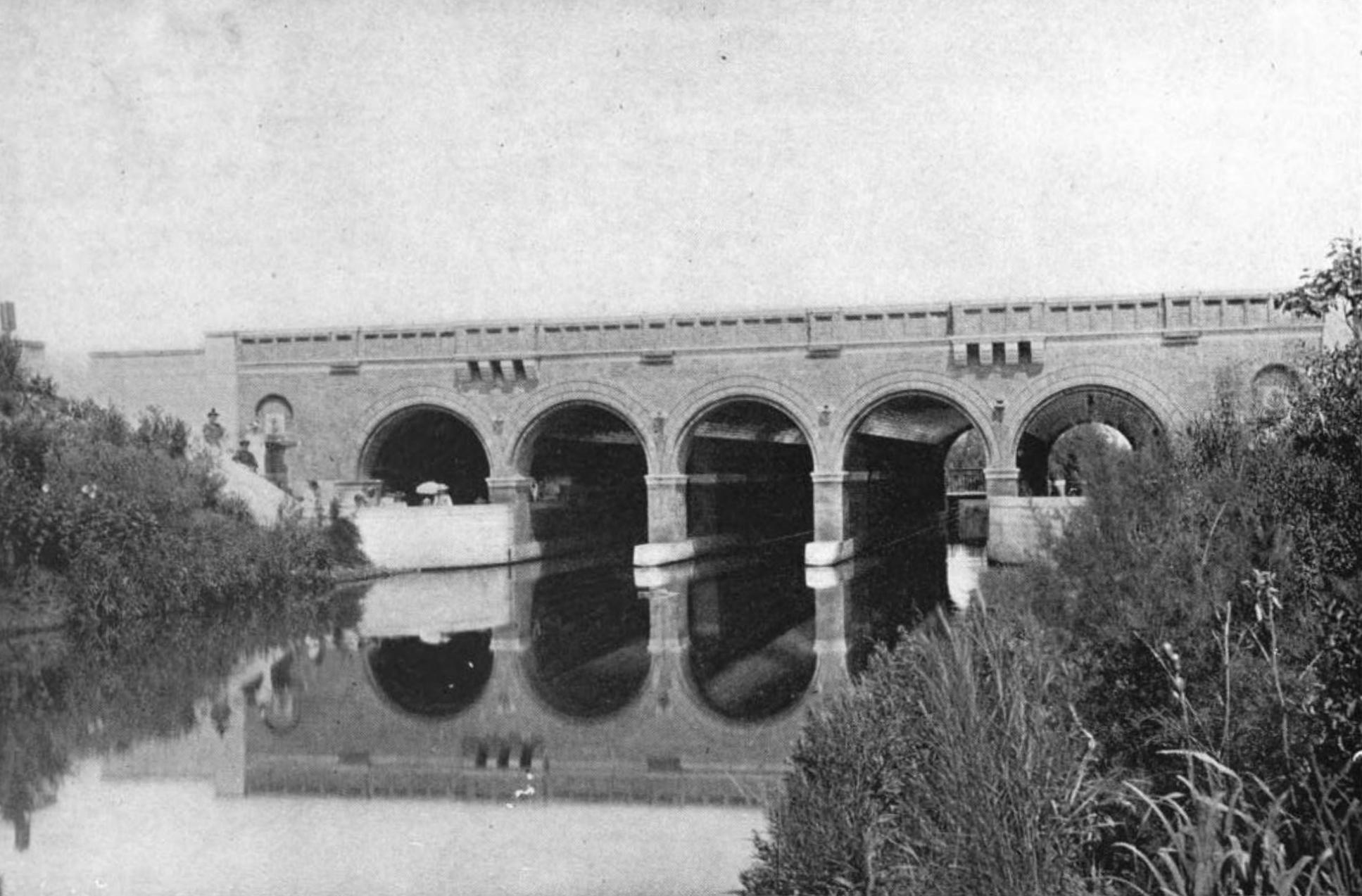
The Stony Brook bridge in 1898

Along with the Evans Way footbridge, two road bridges are no longer extant. The Fenway originally crossed the Stony Brook canal at the Huntington Entrance on a five-arched bridge designed by the firm of Walker & Kimball. The outer arches were occupied by footpaths, allowing pedestrians to cross under the road. The bridge was faced with red brick ornamented with Milford granite; the archways were faced with patterns of colored glazed bricks. A small iron footbridge crossed the canal just north of the road bridge. The bridges were removed when the canal was filled in 1905; the road bridge was demolished with explosives.

At the Beacon Entrance, a curved bridge crossed the Boston and Albany Railroad (and after the 1890s, Ipswich Street). Its south end connected to Boylston Street at Gaston Square, while its north end met Commonwealth Avenue. Although Richardson sketched designs for truss and suspension bridges, Frederick Olmsted insisted on a plate girder bridge; Richardson's contribution was ultimately the design of the decorative metalwork and lamps. The bridge was constructed in 1880–83. It was demolished around 1962 during construction of the Turnpike Extension and replaced by the Bowker Overpass, though the south abutment remains extant.

=== Structures ===
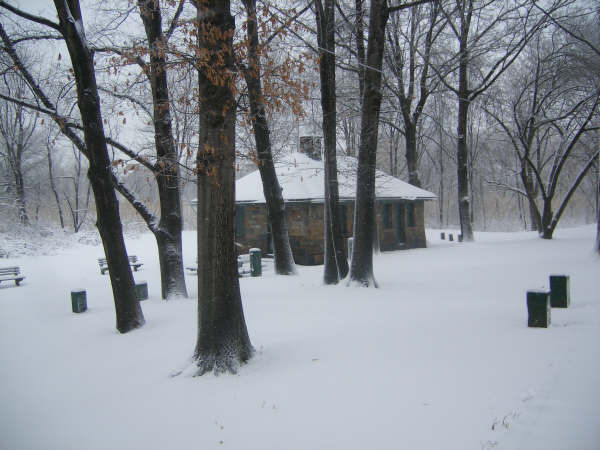
Agassiz Road Duck House

The Agassiz Road Duck House was designed by architect Alexander Longfellow, and built in 1897. It was used exclusively as a public restroom facility, and was closed after a damaging fire in 1986. The Duck House is sited within a prominent landscape in The Fens adjacent to the Agassiz Road bridge—the only building along that roadway. Agassiz Road is a significant pedestrian link between the East and West Fenway neighborhoods though it provides only one-way vehicular circulation. Much of the building that we see today is original; however, the roof design was simplified when it was reconstructed following the 1986 fire.

The Stony Brook Gatehouse was designed by Henry Hobson Richardson. The building features a slate roof with distinctive wooden beams and walls of smooth stones of varying cuts. The red mortar used between the stones is similar to that of many of Richardson's other works. A similar companion building, designed by Richardson protege Edmund Wheelright, sits directly next to this structure. It was added at a later date to contain pump equipment for the Boston Water and Sewer Commission. The Stony Brook Gatehouse has since been decommissioned and in 2010 was converted into the headquarters for the Emerald Necklace Conservancy, and a visitors' center by Ann Beha Architects.

Dedicated on December 27, 1925, the Fire Alarm Office is near the intersection of Westland Avenue and Hemenway Street. It is a neoclassical limestone building in the shape of a villa, with large ornate bronze entry doors to one side. Its facade is inscribed:

erected by the citizens of boston to fortify and extend the principle of organized resistance to the scourge of fire, consecrated and dedicated to the service through which this principle is so nobly perpetuated.

=== Monuments and memorials ===
A monument was dedicated in 1973 to baseball player and humanitarian Roberto Clemente (1934–1972). It is a 5-foot-tall (1.5 m) stone marker inset with a large bronze relief of Clemente and a short inscription in Spanish and English, "Roberto Clemente: His three loves; Puerto Rico, baseball, and children." The adjacent baseball diamond, which is part of the athletic field, is also dedicated in his honor.

The Katharine Lee Bates monument is a freestanding granite tablet inset with a bronze plaque on Agassiz Road overlooking the Muddy River and Stony Brook gatehouse. The plaque gives brief information on Bates and includes the lyrics of "America the Beautiful", which she wrote at the turn of the 20th century.

Close to the Westland Gate is the John Boyle O'Reilly Memorial. This memorial, sculpted in 1894 by Daniel Chester French memorializes the Irish poet and editor of the Catholic newspaper The Pilot. In the front of the memorial sits the bust of O'Reilly while the backside depicts a statue of Erin weaving a wreath of laurel and oak for her sons Poetry and Patriotism with Celtic calligraphy as a backdrop.

Several streets surrounding the Fens (Kilmarnock, Queensbury) were given names of Scottish peerages and towns mentioned in Robert Burns's literary works. In 1910 The Burns Memorial Association of Boston held a competition to make a statue of Burns, to correspond with that nomenclature as an honor. The winner was artist Henry Hudson Kitson. Kitson completed the statue in 1919, and Governor Calvin Coolidge dedicated it the next year on New Years Day, 1920. The piece was moved from the Fenway to Winthrop Square at Otis and Devonshire Streets, in the Financial District, in the summer of 1975. It was restored and returned to its original location on October 30, 2019.

A memorial commemorating the radio operators who lost their lives on merchant ships during the Second World War depicts a sinking ship with "End of service" in Morse Code around the base. It was moved in the 1990s to Peddocks Island at the request of veteran operators, as Peddocks was where they trained. Its plinth remains located on Agassiz Road adjacent to the Agassiz Bridge, overlooking the war memorials across from the Kelleher Rose Garden.

The Temple Bell, a bronze bell cast in 1675 by Tanaka Gonzaemon under the supervision of Suzuki Magoemon, was dedicated to Bishamon, a Buddhist god of children and good luck. The bell was contributed to the Japanese war effort in 1940 but ended up on a scrap heap in Yokosuka. Sailors from the USS Boston (CA-69) salvaged the bell after World War II, and offered it to the city of Boston in 1945. In 1953, Japanese officials presented the bell to Boston as a symbol of peace.

==== John Endecott Monument ====
Across from the Forsyth Dental Institute and Museum of Fine Arts on Forsyth Way, originally called the Huntington Avenue Entrance to The Fens, this is a large red granite monument and white granite statue of John Endecott. The statue is a standing portrayal of John Endecott dressed in early colonial attire, consisting of a jacket with a wide, square collar, knee breeches, buckle shoes, and a long cape. He holds his hat down at his side in his right hand. The sculpture rests on a square base that extends from a large granite wall with the inscription "JOHN ENDECOTT 1588–1665". A low granite bench surrounds the base of the wall.

According to inscriptions on one side of the monument, it was designed by Architect Ralph Weld Gray, and the statue was sculpted by Carl Paul Jennewein in 1936. The rear of the monument features a large inscription, "Bequest George Augustus Peabody Esquire of Danvers, Massachusetts". The main inscription features the seal of the Commonwealth of Massachusetts and the quote "STRONG, VALIANT JOHN WILT THOU MARCH ON, AND TAKE UP STATION FIRST, CHRIST CAL'D HATH THEE, HIS SOLDIER BE, AND FAIL NOT OF THY TRUST -EDWARD JOHNSON 1654".

==== Veterans Memorial Park ====
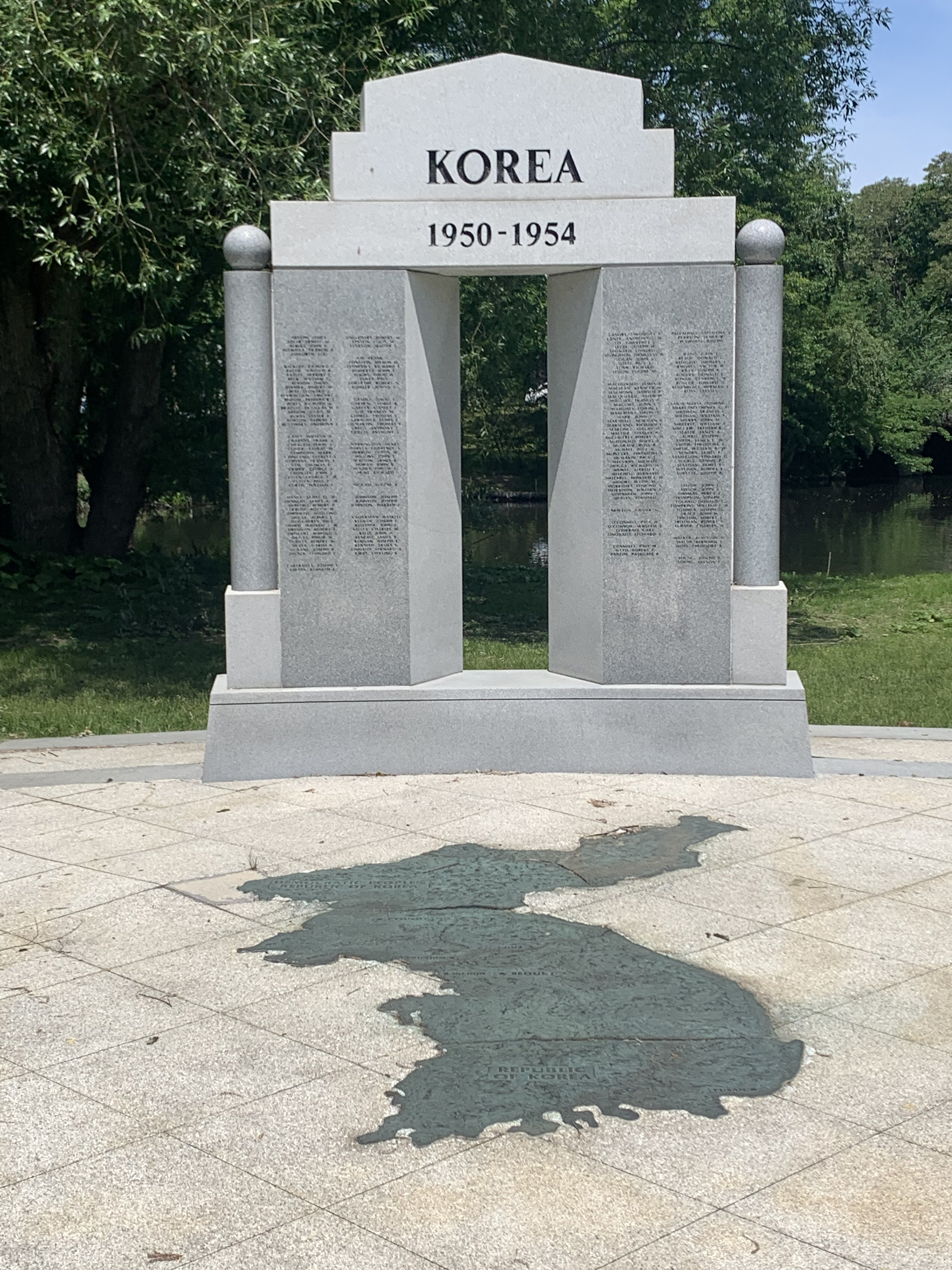
The Korean War Memorial in Veterans Memorial Park, in Boston's Back Bay Fens

Created by the George Robert White Fund in 1948, this is a grouping of three war memorials arranged around a circle, adjacent to the Keller Rose Garden, the Agassiz Bridge, and a concert grove that overlooks two gatehouses across the Muddy River.

This World War II memorial features a granite monument designed by architect Tito Cascieri. It is composed of a plinth stage and lectern backed by a semi-circular wall, with names set in bronze tablets. A large bronze statue of an angel sculpted by John F. Paramino sits atop the memorial, along with an obelisk capped with bronze stars. It is the oldest and largest of the three memorials on the site, with the Korean and Vietnam war memorials flanking it. The lectern has a plaque, added during the 1990s, rededicating the entire memorial as Veterans Memorial Park and honoring Sergeant Charles Andrew MacGillivary, a World War II Congressional Medal of Honor recipient who enlisted in Boston.

The Korean War Memorial is a small installation, compared to the World War II memorial nearby. This memorial has a stone plaza area, with a map of the country of Korea embedded in it. Flanking the map are two stone slabs for use as benches. The memorial is a squarish monument that has three columns with names engraved in them. On top is the word, "Korea" and the years, "1950–1954."

The Vietnam War Memorial is a small installation, compared to the World War II memorial nearby. This memorial has a stone plaza area, with a map of the country of Vietnam embedded in it. Flanking the map are two stone slabs for use as benches. The memorial is a squarish monument that has three columns with names engraved in them. On top is the word, "Vietnam" and the years, "1962–1975."

=== Gardens ===
The Victory Gardens are now named after Richard D. Parker, one of the original organizers of the garden, who gardened there until his death in 1975. The Victory Gardens in the Fenway are one of only two remaining victory gardens in the U.S. dating back to World War II, during which President Franklin Roosevelt encouraged Americans to grow their own vegetables. The City of Boston set up 49 areas to grow gardens, including plots on Boston Common and Boston Public Garden. The Fenway Victory Gardens were established in 1942. These gardens are a central part of the Fenway community and are well known to gardeners across the country. Residents use the plots to grow vegetables or flowers.

A passion for public rose gardens swept the country in the early 20th century. In 1930, landscape architect Arthur Shurcliff added a circular formal rose garden and fountain opposite the Museum of Fine Arts where the general public as well as rose enthusiasts could learn about rose culture and enjoy the flowers. The garden was expanded in 1933 when the rectangular section was built. At the south end of the rectangular portion of the garden is a statue that is a copy of the famous El Desconsol which was a gift to the City of Boston by Barcelona, Spain. In 1975, the garden was named the James P. Kelleher Rose Garden to honor the Boston Parks and Recreation Department's Superintendent of Horticulture. By the late 20th century, The Kelleher Rose Garden was in decline and needed a complete restoration. In 2001, the Emerald Necklace Conservancy, in cooperation with the Boston Parks and Recreation Department, convened landscape architects, horticultural specialists, and rosarians to develop a master plan for its renewal. Paths and planting beds were recut according to the original plans; the soil was rejuvenated and new turf laid. An irrigation system was installed and new signs were placed to help visitors learn from the garden. The restoration was completed in 2008. In 2014 the Emerald Necklace Conservancy completed restoration of the original ornamental fountain and had the descendant of the original sculpture manufacturer replicate missing ornamental cherub statues.

=== Athletic fields ===
As part of Arthur Shurcliff's alterations to The Fens, an athletic track and field was constructed in 1923. Two massive cast stone bleachers were completed in 1926 followed shortly in 1928 by a field house designed by William D. Austin. The original field house was demolished in the 1980s, due to neglect, and replaced with a simple Gothic styled storage structure. The 420m athletic track and field was later dedicated as the Joseph Lee Playground. At some point two baseball diamonds were added. One of them is dedicated to baseball player and humanitarian Roberto Clemente with a cast stone monument featuring a brass relief & dedication plaque. The other was dedicated to neighborhood residents Brian and David Cobe in 1984 with a bronze plaque inset into a Roxbury puddingstone boulder adjacent to the diamond. Sometime in the 1970s two basketball courts were also added alongside the playground and dedicated in honor of Jim Bradley. In 2010, as part of a public-private partnership between the City of Boston and Emmanuel College, the field was extensively renovated to collegiate standards, which necessitated the demolition of one of the stone bleachers.
