= Statue of Robert Burns (Boston) =

Statue in Boston, Massachusetts, U.S.

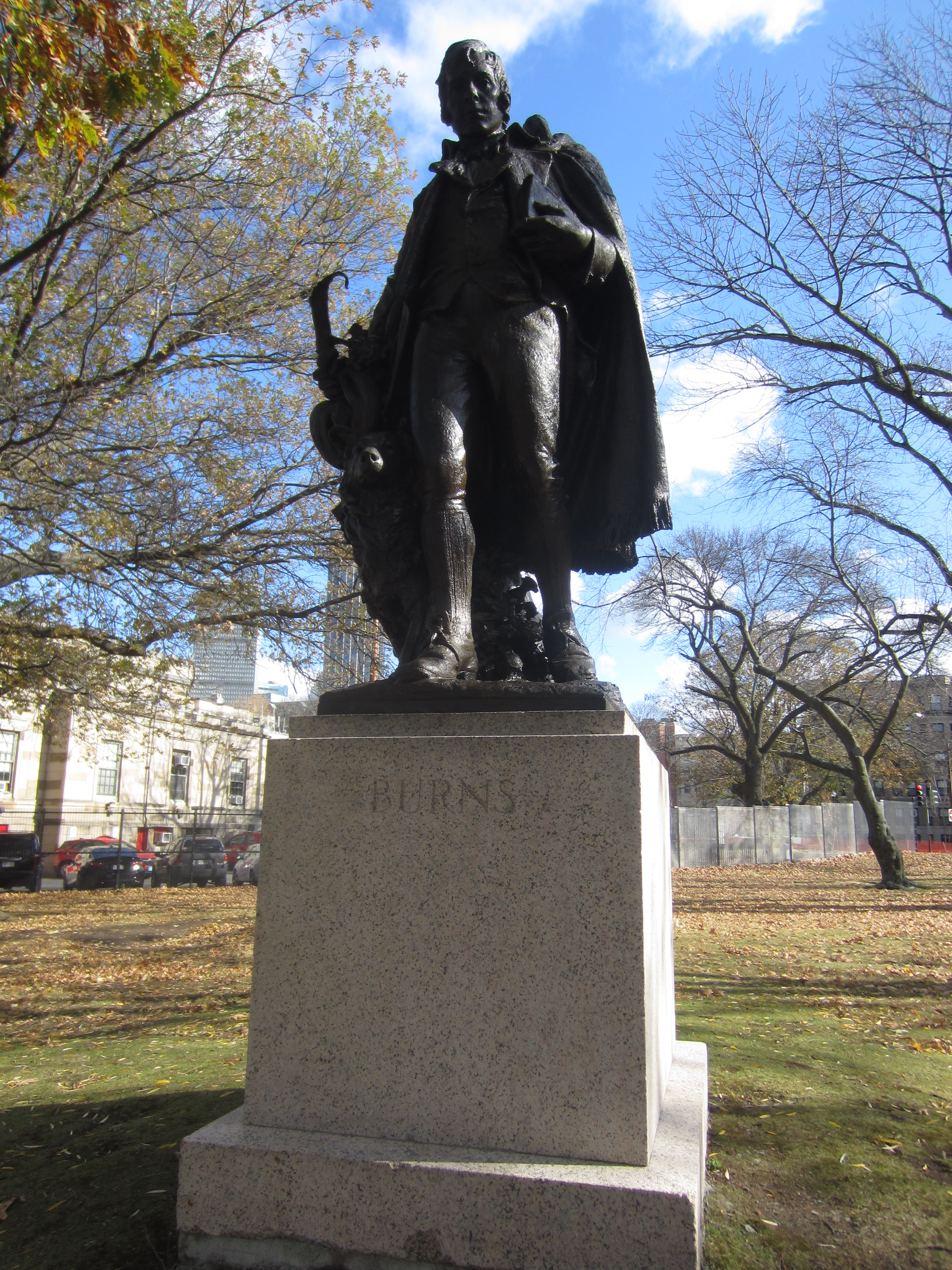
- The statue along The Fens in 2019
- Artist: Henry Hudson Kitson
- Medium: Bronze sculpture
- Subject: Robert Burns
- Location: 42°20′37.9″N 71°05′29.8″W

A statue of poet Robert Burns by Henry Hudson Kitson is installed along The Fens in Boston's Fenway–Kenmore neighborhood, in the U.S. state of Massachusetts. Between 1975 and 2019, it stood in Boston's Winthrop Square.

== Description ==
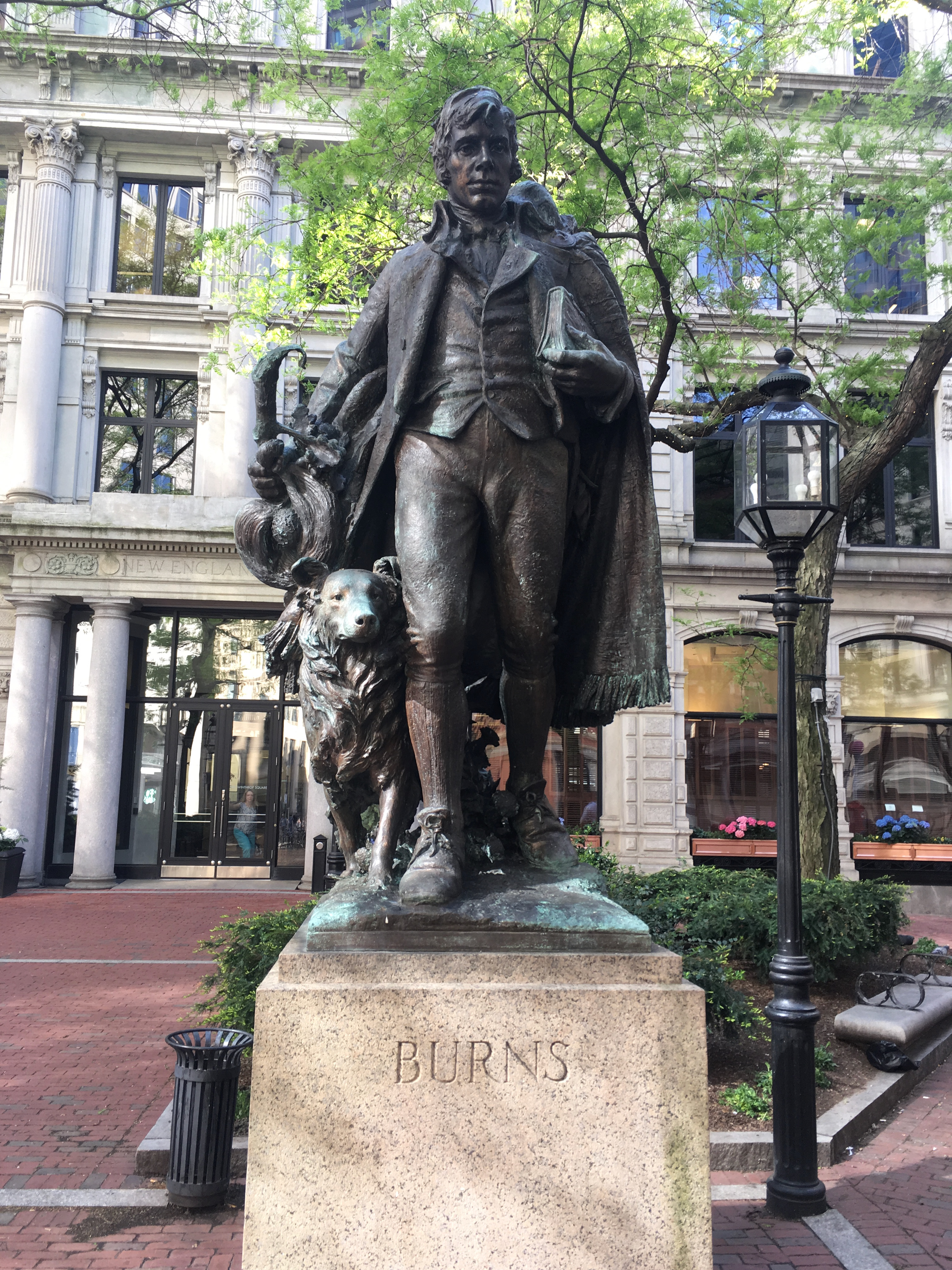
The statue in Winthrop Square in 2012

The bronze sculpture measures approximately 9 x 5 x 5 ft, and rests on a granite base that measures approximately 4 ft. 8 in. x 4 ft. x 5 ft. 2 in. It depicts Burns walking with his dog Luath who was immortalized in Burns’ poem "The Twa Dogs".

== History ==
In 1910 The Burns Memorial Association of Boston held a competition to make a statue of Burns, to correspond with that nomenclature as an honor. The winner was artist Henry Hudson Kitson. Kitson completed the statue in 1919, and Governor Calvin Coolidge dedicated it the next year on New Years Day, 1920. In the summer of 1975, the piece was moved, without permission, from the Fenway to Winthrop Square at Otis and Devonshire Streets, in the Financial District. City officials assumed it had been stolen, but it transpired a developer named Ted Raymond was behind the move. "We originally asked for the statue of John Winthrop," Raymond told the Boston Globe. This was denied, but the city's arts commission offered up Burns' statue instead. During its 40-year stay in Winthrop Square, many people assumed it was a statue of John Winthrop.

The statue was restored and returned to its original location on October 30, 2019. It was surveyed by the Smithsonian Institution's "Save Outdoor Sculpture!" program in 1993.

== See also ==
- List of Robert Burns memorials
