= Winthrop Square =

Winthrop Square may refer to:

- Winthrop Square (Charlestown, Boston), a public square in Boston's Charlestown neighbourhood
- Winthrop Square (Financial District, Boston), a public square in Boston's financial district
