= Boston Flower Exchange =

Wholesale flower market

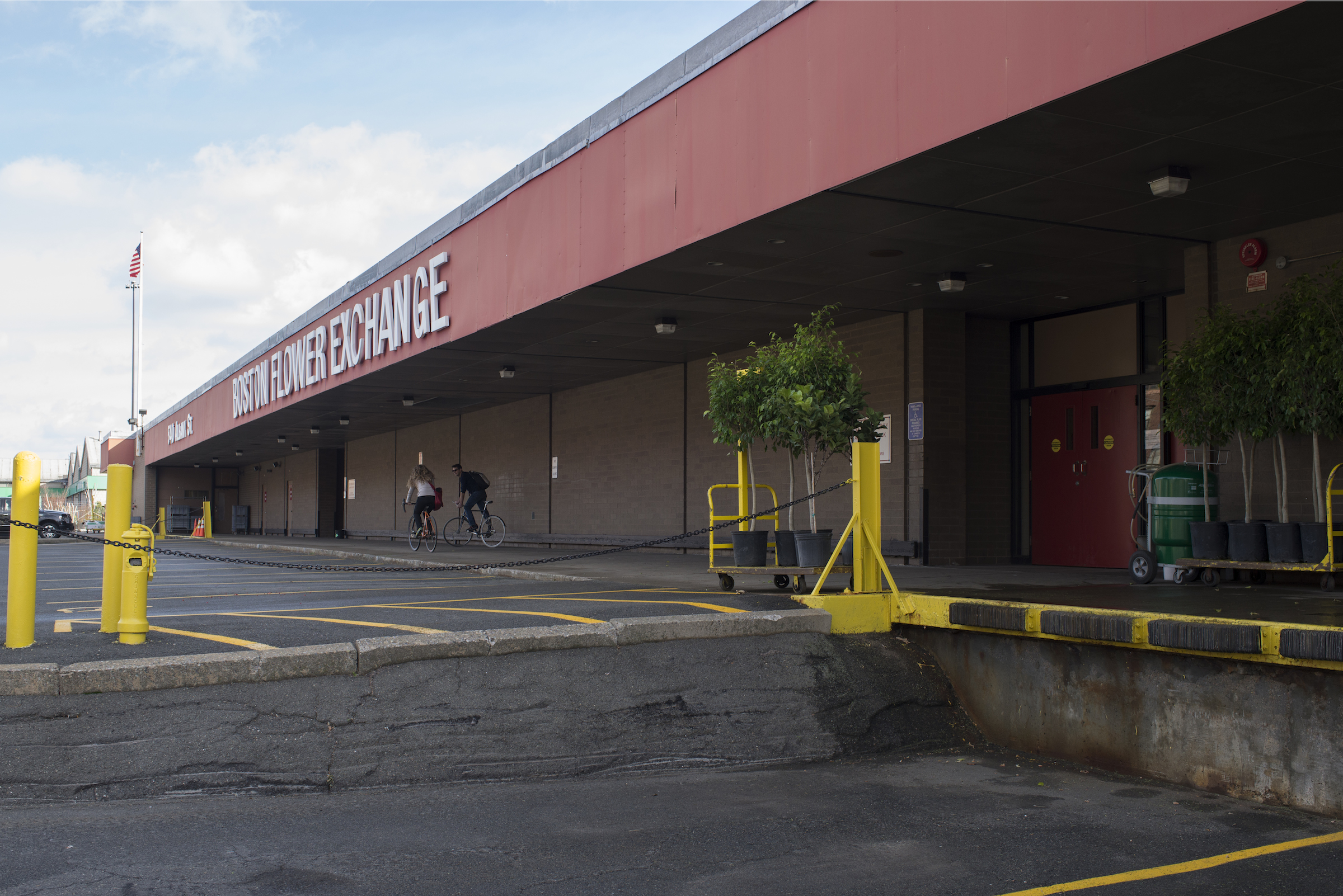
- The Boston Flower Exchange at 540 Albany St. in 2015
- Location: 540 Albany St Boston, Massachusetts
- Opening date: 1909
- Owner: Boston Flower Exchange, LLC
- Environment: Indoor
- Goods sold: Flowers and plants
- Days normally open: Monday – Friday - 5:00 AM – 12:00 PM; Saturday 6:00 AM – 10:00 AM certain Sundays 6:00 AM – 10:00 AM
- Number of tenants: 13
- Total retail floor area: 73,000 sq ft (6,800 m^{2})
- Website: http://www.thebostonflowerexchange.com/

The Boston Flower Exchange is a wholesale flower market located in Boston, Massachusetts. Founded as a marketplace that local growers could rent cooperatively to sell their products in a space more suited to their needs than Boston's historic Haymarket open-air marketplace, it has been the focal point of the floral trade of New England for over a hundred years. Although originally a local growers' wholesale market, the Flower Exchange now features flowers and foliage from dozens of countries and has expanded to carry potted plants, glassware, pottery and other floral supplies. The Flower Exchange is not open to the public and is limited to members of the trade only.

In December 2016, it was announced that the exchange will be moving to a 65,000-square-foot (6,000 m^{2}) facility on 2nd Street in Chelsea and changing their name to the New England Flower Exchange. The move will be final by the end of January 2017.

== History ==
The Boston Cooperative Flower Growers Association leased the first space for a wholesale growers' market in 1892 beneath the old Horticultural Hall, on Bromfield Street, near the current Park Street T Station. Before the end of the year the location was overcrowded and the board of directors decided to lease the basement of the Park Street Church in 1894. As the success of the market continued to attract more growers and buyers, the market was forced to move again, albeit briefly, in 1903, this time to 163 Columbus Avenue. When the stalls in the newly renovated market were auctioned off, the exorbitant prices pushed some of the growers to form another organization, named the Boston Cooperative Market, which opened in the basement of the old Music Hall. The Exchange moved back to its Park Street quarters.

The Flower Exchange was founded in 1909 when the two organizations combined in order to find a building that could better meet their collective needs. They moved once more, in February 1913, to Winthrop Square before settling on the Cyclorama Building on Tremont Street in 1923, which once housed the famous panoramic painting of the battle Gettysburg. Due to the increasingly haphazard parking situation and plans by the controversial Boston Redevelopment Authority to purchase the Cyclorama building, the original home to the Gettysburg Cyclorama, now the main building of the Boston Center for the Arts, the board of directors began looking for a new location in 1963.

In 1941 the market became wholesale only with admission by badge at the petition of group of local florists. In 1957 the first product from outside New England, anemones from New York, were admitted for sale on a trial basis. The market was opened to all imported products in 1965 after the board of directors approved a petition by one of the wholesalers. Commissioned salesmen were first approved in 1958, allowing salesmen and wholesale companies to sell the product instead of than the growers themselves to attend their booths.

During the first half of the 20th century the New England region rose to prominence as a cut flower producer, cultivating many varieties of hybrid roses and carnations in greenhouses. The New England Carnation Growers Association had as many as 125 members but rising oil prices forced many out of business and the association was abandoned in 1980.

The Boston Flower Exchange Inc. moved to its location on Albany Street in 1971. As the construction of the new building was on reclaimed land, the process greatly slowed by the discovery of many old wharf pilings, seawalls and sewers. The 73,000-square-foot (6,800 m^{2}) building has over 10,000 square feet (930 m^{2}) of refrigerated space. When the market first opened there were more than 40 wholesalers accessible through a single switchboard operator.

== Today ==
As of January 1, 2008 the Flower Exchange housed thirteen independent wholesale companies in imported and domestic cut flowers and foliage, potted plants and floral supplies. The companies are listed on the Boston Flower Exchange website.

The scale and variety of product at the Flower Exchange has changed since the 1960s as the flower industry was one of the first to feel the effects of globalization. Now products are shipped via air and/ or refrigerated truck from nearly every continent.

== Scholarship ==
Rachel Butterworth Deitz, a shareholder in the Boston Flower Exchange, endowed her stock to form a scholarship to give to students interested in the study and pursuit of floriculture. This is awarded annually at the stockholder's meeting.
