= World War II Memorial (Fenway–Kenmore, Boston) =

War memorial in Boston, Massachusetts, U.S.

Coordinates: 42°20′31.3″N 71°5′38.5″W

- United States of America
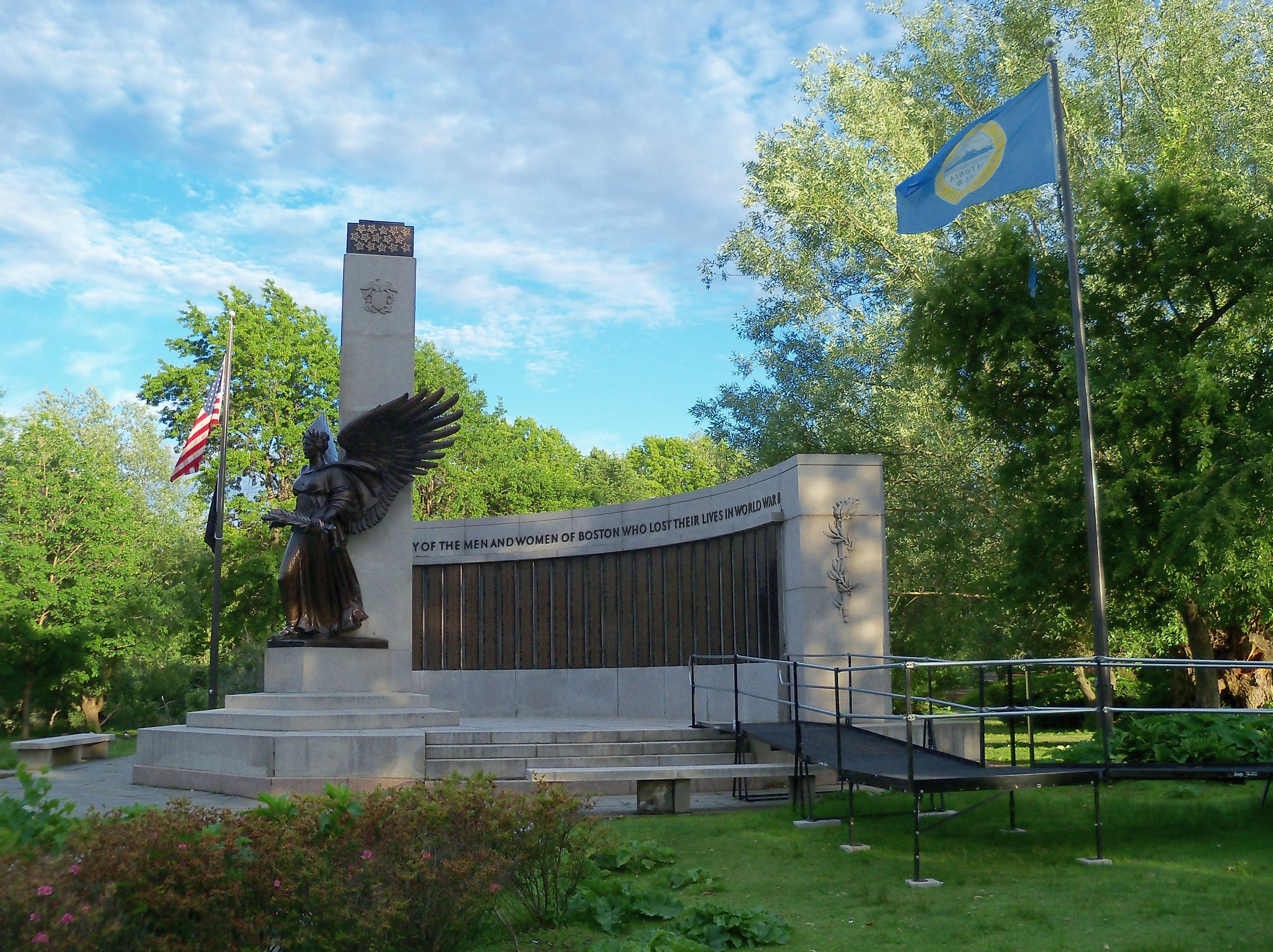
- The memorial in 2013
- For casualties of World War II
- Unveiled: 1949; 77 years ago
- Location: Boston, Massachusetts
- Designed by: John Francis Paramino
- In memory of the men and women of boston who lost their lives in world war II

The World War II Memorial by John Francis Paramino is installed in the Back Bay Fens in Boston, Massachusetts, United States. It was completed during 1947–1949, copyrighted in 1948, and erected in 1949. The bronze and granite war memorial features an allegorical statue of a winged female figure of Victory. Behind her is a wall with 27 bronze plaques listing the names of the people who died in World War II. The work was surveyed as part of the Smithsonian Institution's "Save Outdoor Sculpture!" program in 1993.
