= Boston American =

Newspaper in Boston, Massachusetts, U.S.

The Boston American
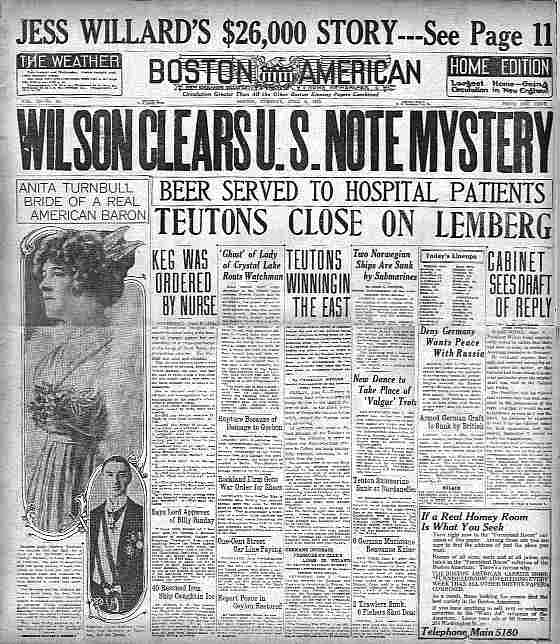
- The newspaper's front page from June 8, 1915
- Type: Daily newspaper
- Format: Broadsheet
- Founded: March 21, 1904
- Ceased publication: September 30, 1961
- Language: English
- Headquarters: Boston, Massachusetts, U.S.

The Boston American was a daily tabloid newspaper published in Boston, Massachusetts, United States, from March 21, 1904, until September 30, 1961. The newspaper was part of William Randolph Hearst's chain, and thus was also known as Hearst's Boston American.

The Boston American featured the American Sunday Monthly Magazine.

The newspaper's pressrooms were in Boston's Winthrop Square in 1921.

== Mergers ==
In 1961, the Boston American merged with the Boston Record to become the Boston Record-American, a tabloid that was published throughout the day with five to six editions, including an edition that came out dated the next day so that petty gamblers could check the "street number" on which bookies paid off. In 1972, it merged with the Boston Herald Traveler (no hyphen) to become the Boston Herald-Traveler and Record American (mornings) and the Record American and Boston Herald-Traveler (evenings) The broadsheets eventually were renamed the Boston Herald-American. After Hearst Corp. formally suspended publication, buyer Ruppert Murdoch reached back to Boston Herald name, which last appeared on the banner in 1967 in the days between the end of the Boston newspaper strike and the merger of the Herald and Traveler, and removed "American," eliminating the title for good.

== Notable incidents ==
On the evening of January 11, 1908, there was a riot of approximately 200 unionized newsboys in front of the Boston American office. The newsboys attacked three policemen, who were stripped of their hats and badges by the newsboys. One of the cops and a bystander were hospitalized. The newsboys had stopped carrying the American after Hearst had increased its cost to them. When Hearst countered by bringing in non-unionized newsboys, the riot ensued.
