= Westland Gate =

Coordinates: 42.3440°N 71.0900°W

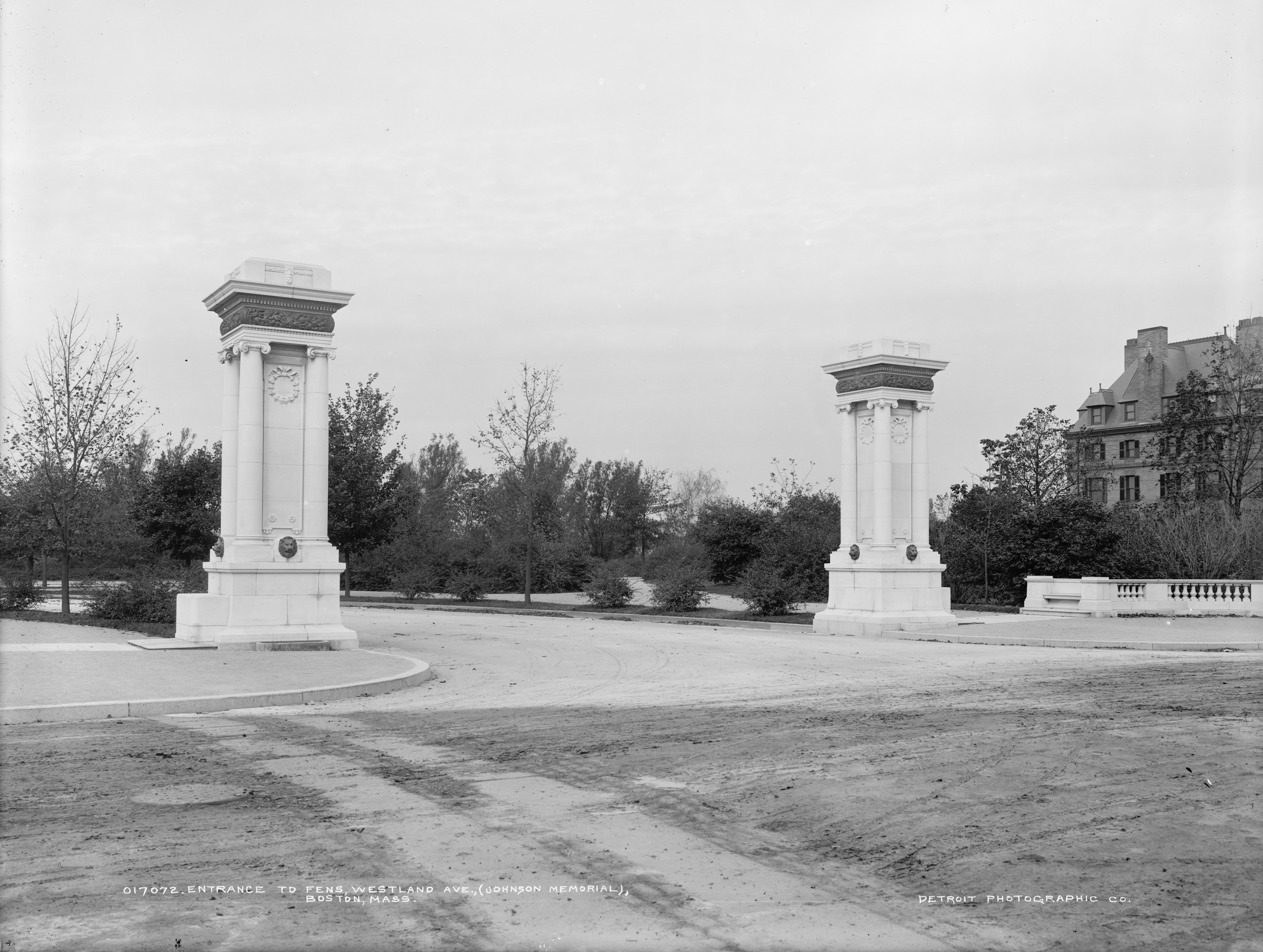
Westland Gate in the early 1900s

Westland Gate (also known as the Johnson Gates) is a pair of fountains that borders the Back Bay Fens at the end of Westland Avenue in Boston.

== History ==
Westland Gate was designed by Guy Lowell, architect of the Boston's Museum of Fine Arts, and was built in 1902 and erected in 1905. The decorative bronze was produced by the Hecla Iron Works. The fountains were originally named the Johnson Memorial Fountain after a wealthy Bostonian, Jesse Johnson, whose widow, Ellen Cheney Johnson, donated money to erect them. The fountains consist of two large pillars caped with bronze frieze panels made of granite and Tennessee marble flanking the street with four bronze lions heads near their bases that originally spouted water.

=== Restoration efforts ===
The fountains were first restored in 1980. It appears that the 1980 restoration involved either sandblasting or honing to address inconsistencies in the stone, as well as application of a protective treatment (to resist graffiti) using Browne Fund money. The gates were rededicated in a ceremony that followed this restoration in August 1980. The 1990 restoration involved cleaning of the marble, repointing and repair of cracks in the stone, application of protective treatment, and cleaning and repair of the metal components (decorative frieze, lion heads, and commemorative plaque). A new lighting system was proposed for the gates at this time, but seems never to have been installed. On May 4, 2008, a spokesperson for the Boston Parks Department stated that the "fountains are on a list of projects to be repaired". However, over a year later, the fountains still remain in poor condition and are non-functional.

A new restoration effort spearheaded by the Fenway Civic Association (FCA) began in 2012, securing funding for conservation assessments, performed in October 2013. In 2013 the bronze elements were cleaned, repatinated, and treated with wax sealant. In 2014 Preservation Massachusetts designated the Johnson Memorial Gates as one of the Massachusetts Most Endangered Historic Resources. In 2015, grant funding from the Browne Fund restored the two horse troughs and provided weather tight covers on Hemenway Street. For fiscal year 2017 the city of Boston approved $820,000 for Johnson Memorial Gates monument conservation, accessibility upgrades, and landscape rehabilitation. These funds were complemented by a $67,985 grant administered by the Boston Planning and Development Agency in 2017. For fiscal year 2019, the city of Boston approved the increase of project funds for the monument and surrounding parkland to $1,002,000; these funds were complemented by a Community Preservation Act pilot grant awarded to FCA in June, 2018.
