= Temple Bell (Boston) =

Bronze bell in Boston, Massachusetts, U.S.

- Japanese Temple Bell
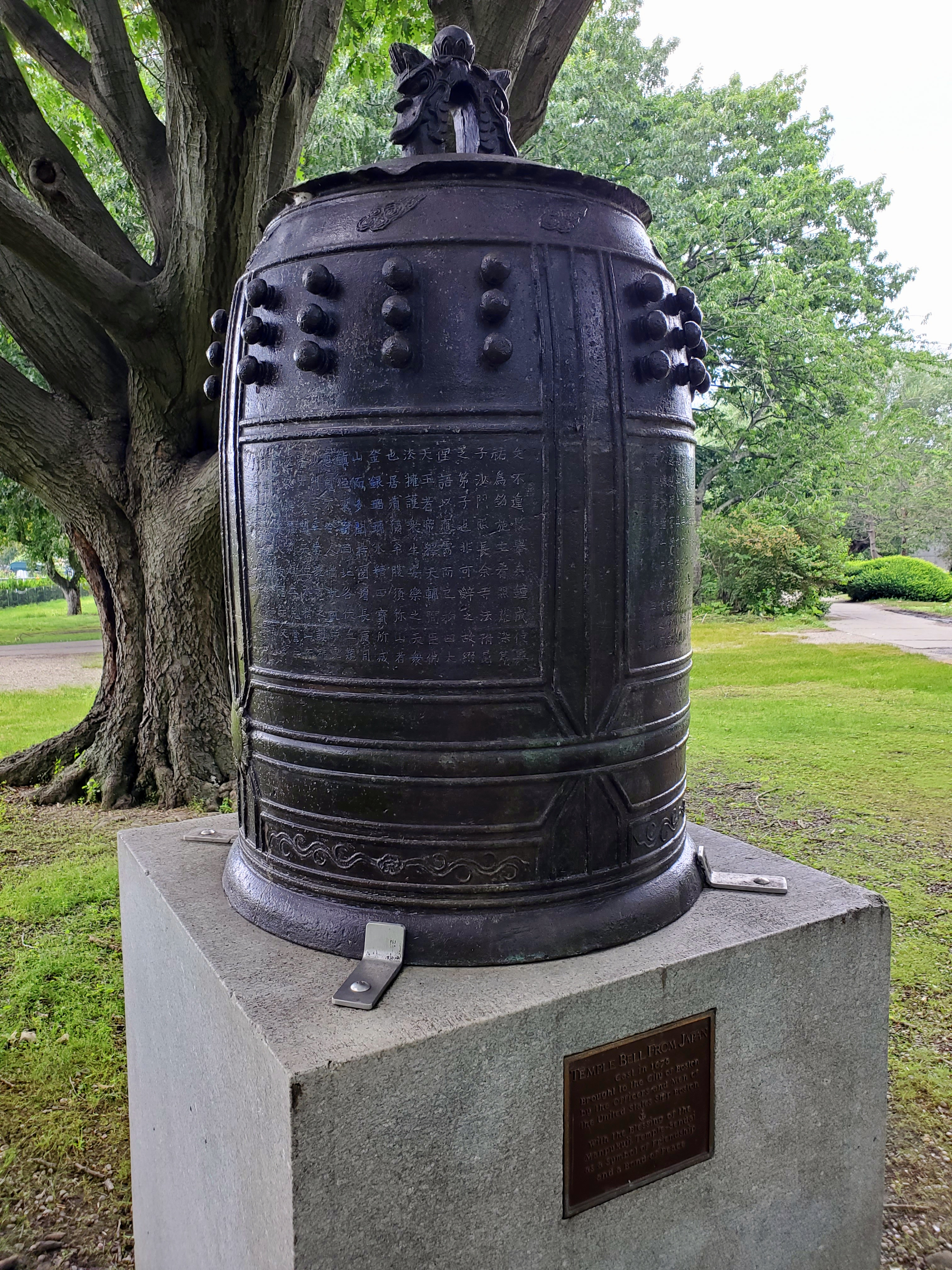
- The bell in 2021
- Artist: Suzuki Magoemon
- Year: 1675
- Medium: Bronze sculpture
- Dimensions: 0.91 m (3 ft); 0.61 m diameter (2 ft)
- Location: Boston, Massachusetts, U.S.; 42°20′28.8″N 71°5′39.4″W

Temple Bell, also known as Japanese Temple Bell, is a bell and bronze sculpture by Suzuki Magoemon, installed in Boston's Back Bay Fens, in the U.S. state of Massachusetts. Cast in 1675, the bell was originally installed in Manpukuji Temple, in Sendai, Japan, before being salvaged by USS Boston sailors. It was presented to the City of Boston by the sailors in 1945, before being officially presented by Japan as a symbol of peace in 1953. The bell was also previously installed in Boston Common.

== Description ==
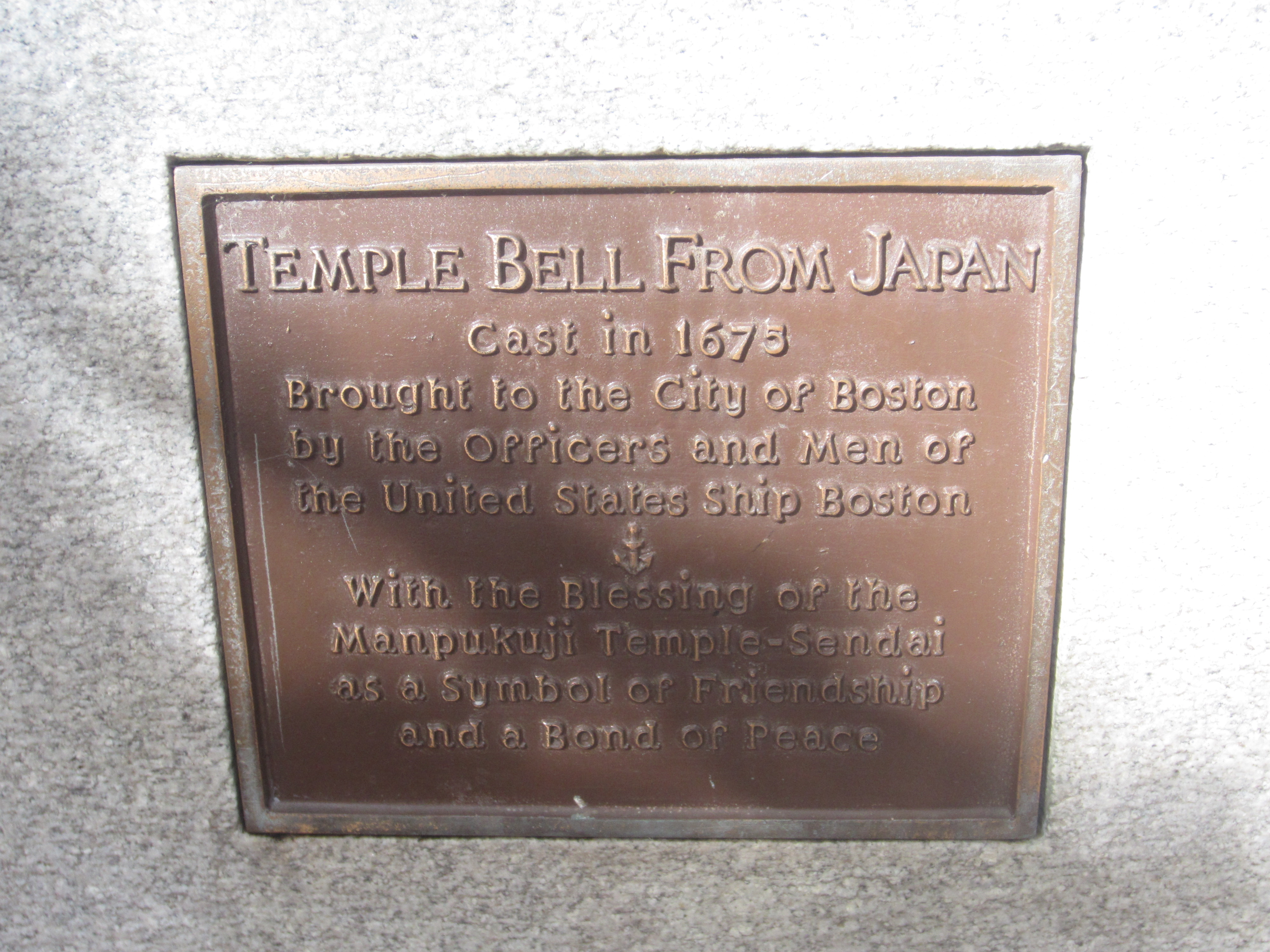
Plaque, 2019

The cylindrical bronze sculpture is approximately three feet (0.91 m) tall and has a diameter of two feet (0.61 m). It rests on a granite base that measures approximately 3 feet 7 inches (1.09 m) by 2 feet 8 inches (0.81 m) by 2 feet 8 inches (0.81 m). It features etchings of Japanese figures and writings.

== History ==
The bell was cast in 1675. It was originally installed in Sendai, Japan's Manpukuji Temple. The bell was salvaged from a scrap yard (where it had been taken to be melted down for ammunition) by sailors from USS Boston, then presented to the City of Boston in 1945. It was officially presented to the city by Japan in 1953 as a symbol of peace.

The work was previously installed in Boston Common. It was restored in 1992, and surveyed by the Smithsonian Institution's "Save Outdoor Sculpture!" program in 1993.
