= Parker Hill =

Hill in Antarctica

Coordinates: 68°31′S 78°26′E

Parker Hill is a hill exceeding 135 metres (443 ft), located just east of Lake Cowan in the east part of the Vestfold Hills. The hill was the site of a wind-run pole erected by an ANARE (Australian National Antarctic Research Expeditions) party from Davis Station in 1969. Named by Antarctic Names Committee of Australia (ANCA) for Dr. Desmond. Parker, Officer-in-Charge and medical officer at Davis Station in 1969.
