= Ann Beha =

American architect (born 1950)

- Born: June 26, 1950 (age 76); New York, New York
- Education: Wellesley College (1972); Massachusetts Institute of Technology (1975)
- Occupation: Architect
- Spouse: Robert A Radloff (1975-)
- Buildings: The New England Conservatory of Music, Student Life and Performance Center, and Jordan Hall renewal, The New Britain Museum of American Art, CT; the Center for Art and Education at Shelburne Museum, with Steven Gerrard AIA and Thomas Hotaling AIA.
- Projects: Cambridge Public Library, with Pamela Hawkes FAIA and William Rawn Associates; Liberty Hotel, with Pamela Hawkes FAIA and Cambridge Seven Associates.

Ann Beha (born 1950) is an American architect. She is founder and partner of Ann Beha Architects in Boston, Massachusetts.

== Early life and education ==
Ann Macy Beha was born on June 26, 1950, in New York City. She graduated from Wellesley College in 1972 and earned a Master of Architecture Degree from the Massachusetts Institute of Technology in 1975. While at MIT she founded a community service architectural organization, and following her graduation she was employed in MIT's architecture department and as a research associate. In 1987–88 she was a Loeb Fellow at Harvard University Graduate School of Design, and in 2023 received an Honorary Doctor of Humane Letters degree from Wheaton College in Massachusetts.

== Career ==
Beha began her career as a consultant in historic preservation, working with community groups on their historic but underutilized buildings. Her consultant practice expanded, and she founded an architectural firm in the early 1980s. Ann Beha Architects, now Annum Architects, is located in Boston and works nationally and internationally on buildings of historic significance and designs new buildings for cultural, academic, and civic clients. Her firm's projects include the Music Building at the University of Pennsylvania; the New Britain Museum of American Art in Connecticut; the Carl A. Fields Center at Princeton University; the Portland Art Museum in Oregon; Saieh Hall for Economics at the University of Chicago; a new Student Life and Performance Center at the New England Conservatory of Music; the addition and expansion of Cornell Law School; and the Cambridge Public Library and Liberty Hotel, two projects undertaken in joint associations. She led the Humanities Quadrangle project at Yale University and continues as a Senior Collaborating Architect for projects with Annum. Ann Beha Architects was selected by the U.S. Department of State for the major rehabilitation of Walter Gropius' Chancery and the U.S. Embassy in Athens campus as part of its Excellence in Diplomatic Facilities program, for the US Embassy in Manila, Master Plan, and the US Embassy in PAris Master PLan, with Ann as Design Principal.

== Notable projects / awards / publications / exhibitions ==
Beha's work has received awards from the American Institute of Architects and its chapters, the Society for College and University Planning, and local historical commissions. She received the 25th anniversary award from the Massachusetts Historical Commission and the lifetime Achievement Award from the Victorian Society in America, New England Chapter and the 2004 Women in Design Award of Excellence from the Boston Society of Architects. She received the Alumnae Achievement Award from Wellesley College and in 2018, the Award of Honor from the Boston Society of Architects, and the inaugural honor award from the US State Department, OBO Industry Advisory Group. She has lectured at the Society for College and University Planning, Columbia University, Middlebury College, the Art Institute of Chicago, AIA Wisconsin, MIT, Yale, the Museum of FIne Arts, Boston, Roger Williams University and the Harvard Graduate School of Design.

Beha was a trustee and past president of Historic New England, served on visiting committees at the Museum of Fine Arts, and was Distinguished Visiting Professor of Architecture at the City College of New York. She is a Fellow of the American Institute of Architects and was the Robert A M Stern Visiting Professor of Architecture at Yale University.

=== Selected Awards ===
Society of Architectural Historians Honor Award 2023; Honorary Doctor of Humane Letters, Wheaton College, 2023; US Department of State Inaugural Design Leadership Award, Bureau of Overseas Building Operations Boston Society of Architects Honor Award, 2018; Women in Design Award, Boston Society of Architects, 1998; Wellesley College, Alumnae Achievement Award; AIA Awards for Design Excellence, AIA National, AIA Connecticut, AIA Illinois; AIA New Hampshire Society for College and University PLanning Design Awards, 1997, 1999, 2008, 2010, 2019, 2020

Cambridge Public Library, American Institute of Architects, Honor Award for Architecture
