= Bowker Overpass =

Philip G. Bowker Overpass
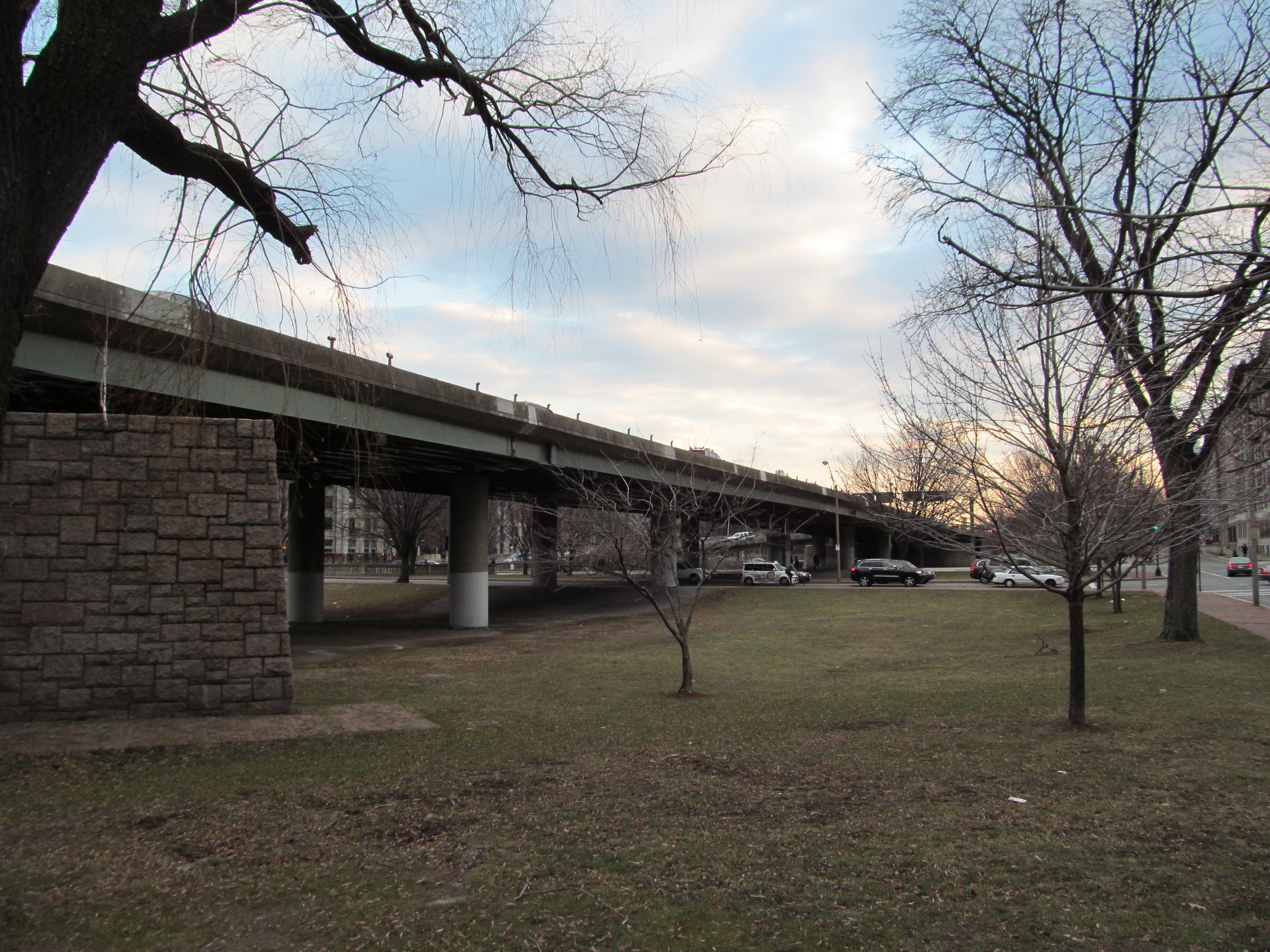
- Bowker Overpass at Commonwealth Avenue
- Coordinates: 42°20′57.36″N 71°5′32.31″W
- Carries: The Charlesgate
- Crosses: Ipswich Street; Framingham/Worcester Line; I-90 / Mass Pike; Commonwealth Avenue; Beacon Street
- Locale: Boston, Massachusetts, US

Characteristics
- Material: Steel
- Total length: 0.2 miles (0.3 km)

History
- Opened: 1965

Location
- Interactive map of Philip G. Bowker Overpass

Philip G. Bowker Overpass, named for a state senator, is a steel beam bridge with a suspended deck carrying The Charlesgate over Commonwealth Avenue, Beacon Street, and Interstate 90. It connects Boylston Street to Storrow Drive. It runs parallel to the Muddy River. In 2011, there was talk about tearing down the bridge and widening local streets as some consider the bridge to be an eyesore, as well as the fact that it bisects a portion of the Emerald Necklace.

== Major intersections ==
The entire route is in Boston, Suffolk County. All exits are unnumbered.

Location	mi	km	Destinations	Notes
Fenway–Kenmore	0.0	0.0	Boylston Street to Commonwealth Avenue / Fenway / Riverway	At-grade intersection
Fenway–Kenmore	0.05	0.080	Commonwealth Avenue – Kenmore Square	Northbound entrance feeds directly to westbound Storrow Drive
Back Bay	0.2	0.32	Storrow Drive west to I-90 / Route 2 west – Newton, Arlington	
Back Bay	0.2	0.32	Storrow Drive east to I-93 / US 1 / Route 28 north – Downtown Boston	
1.000 mi = 1.609 km; 1.000 km = 0.621 mi: Incomplete access
