= Ellen Cheney Johnson =

American prison reformer (1829–1899)

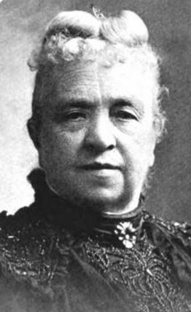
- Ellen Cheney Johnson, from a 1900 publication
- Born: Ellen Cheney; December 20, 1829; Athol, Massachusetts
- Died: June 28, 1899 (aged 69); London, England

Ellen Cheney Johnson (December 20, 1829 – June 28, 1899) was an American prison reformer. She founded the New England Women's Auxiliary Association to the United States Sanitary Commission, worked with homeless and vagrant women after the Civil War through the Dedham Asylum for Discharged Female Prisoners, and served as superintendent of the Massachusetts Reformatory Prison for Women at Framingham.

== Early life ==
Ellen Cheney was born on December 20, 1829, in Athol, Massachusetts. She was the daughter of Nathan Cheney (a mill agent) and Hoda Holbrook. Ellen attended the academy at Francestown, New Hampshire. She later became a teacher at Weare, New Hampshire, where she was also an alumna.

When she was eighteen she joined a temperance organization. Two years later, she met and married Jesse Cram Johnson from Unity, New Hampshire, and moved to Boston.

== Early influences ==
Her home near the State House in Boston became a meeting place for welfare workers. Johnson founded the New England Women's Auxiliary Association which in turn led her to an important position in the U.S. Sanitary Commission. She was involved with the executive and finance committees of the New England branch of the commission.

During this time she would visit numerous correctional facilities and helped poor women around Boston so they could better fend for themselves. Throughout all this, Johnson witnessed the abuse which female prisoners had to endure. At this time, female prisoners were not separated from their male counterparts. Neither were the children they brought in with them, or the ones that were born in jail.

Johnson began a crusade for the reform of female treatment in correctional facilities. She and other women gathered at her home and began writing letters to newspapers requesting a separate facility for females. Their letters brought the subject to legislature. They gathered over 7,000 signatures which helped pass the bill for an all-female prison in 1874.

In the meantime, she became the leading advocate for the Temporary Asylum of Discharged Female Prisoners in Dedham, MA. The Reformatory Prison for women was finally opened in 1877 in Sherborn, near Framingham, MA. Johnson, being one of the five commissioners for the prison, became the superintendent of the prison.

== Career ==
Ellen Cheney Johnson, while running the Massachusetts Reformatory Prison for Women at the turn of the nineteenth century, tried to bridge the approaches of rehabilitation and punishment. As she put it in her own writings, "No lesson is more important than that which teaches respect for the law and dread of its wrath. At the same time, it is a fundamental point in our theory that every criminal can be won by gentleness and patience."

Jonson created programs inside the prison and outside as well to help the women achieve their goals. She developed a system of indenture for house service in houses outside the prison walls. This was all done under sympathetic supervision.

== End of an era ==
Johnson ran the prison for fifteen years and was awarded a bronze medal and diploma for her achievements in the prison system by the World's Columbian Exposition:

for evidence of a model management in every detail.

Her reformatory system has been studied thoroughly and received the highest praise from prison experts.

She died suddenly while in London, England after addressing the International Congress of Women on June 28, 1899. Ellen Johnson left money to the city of Boston to build the Johnson Memorial Fountain (later renamed Westland Gate) in memory of her husband, Jesse Johnson.
