= Winthrop Square (Financial District, Boston) =

Public square in Boston, Massachusetts

- Square in Boston
- {{{other_names}}}
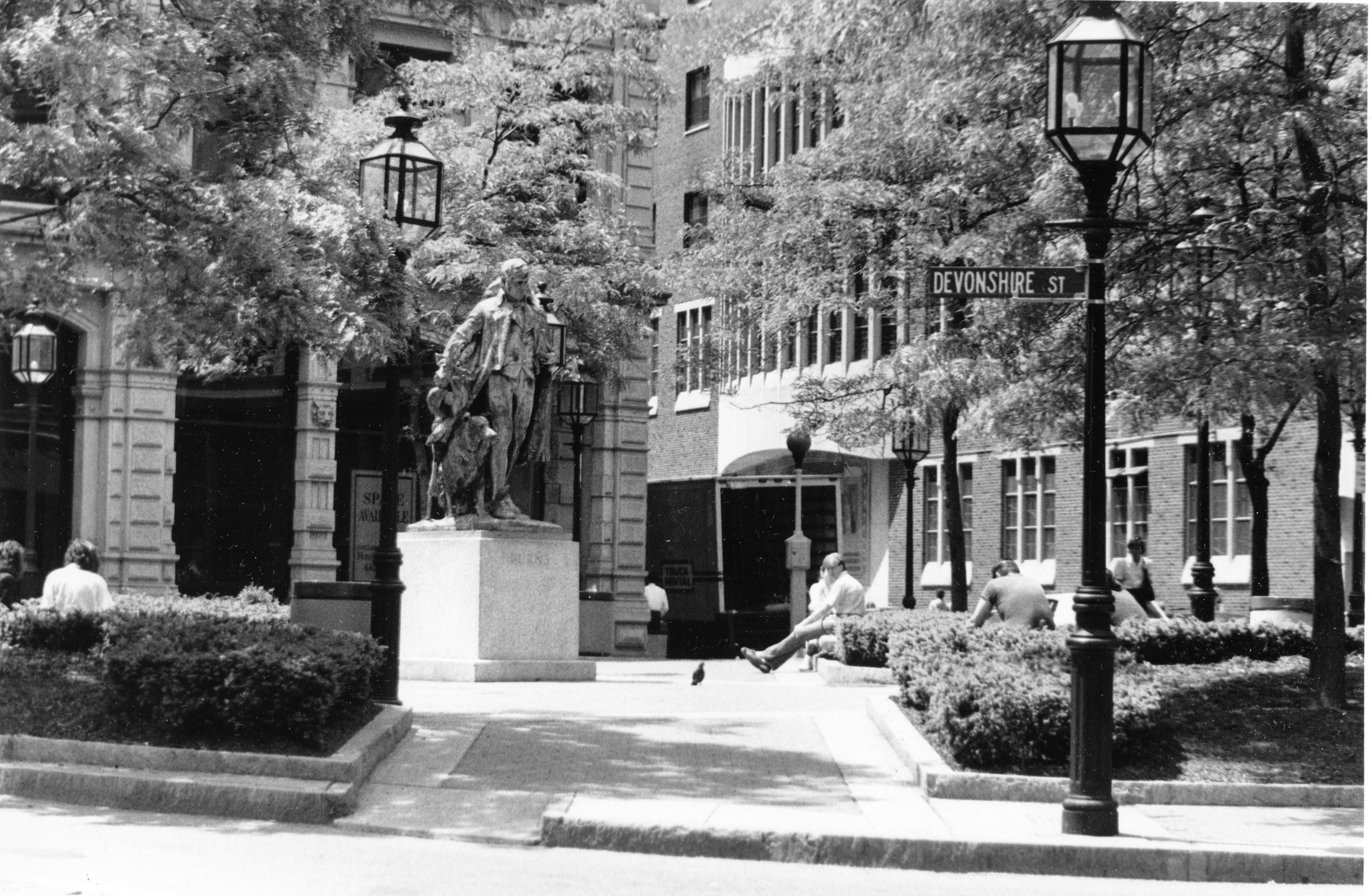
- The square in 2013, viewed from Devonshire Street
- Location: Financial District, Boston, Massachusetts, United States
- Intersection: Otis Street (west); Devonshire Street (east)
- Interactive map of Winthrop Square
- Coordinates: 42.35478°N 71.05763°W

Winthrop Square is a public square in Boston, Massachusetts. It is located in the city's financial district, in a small plot between Otis Street to the west and Devonshire Street to the east. It is three blocks south of the Old State House and two blocks west of Post Office Square.

== Dedication ==
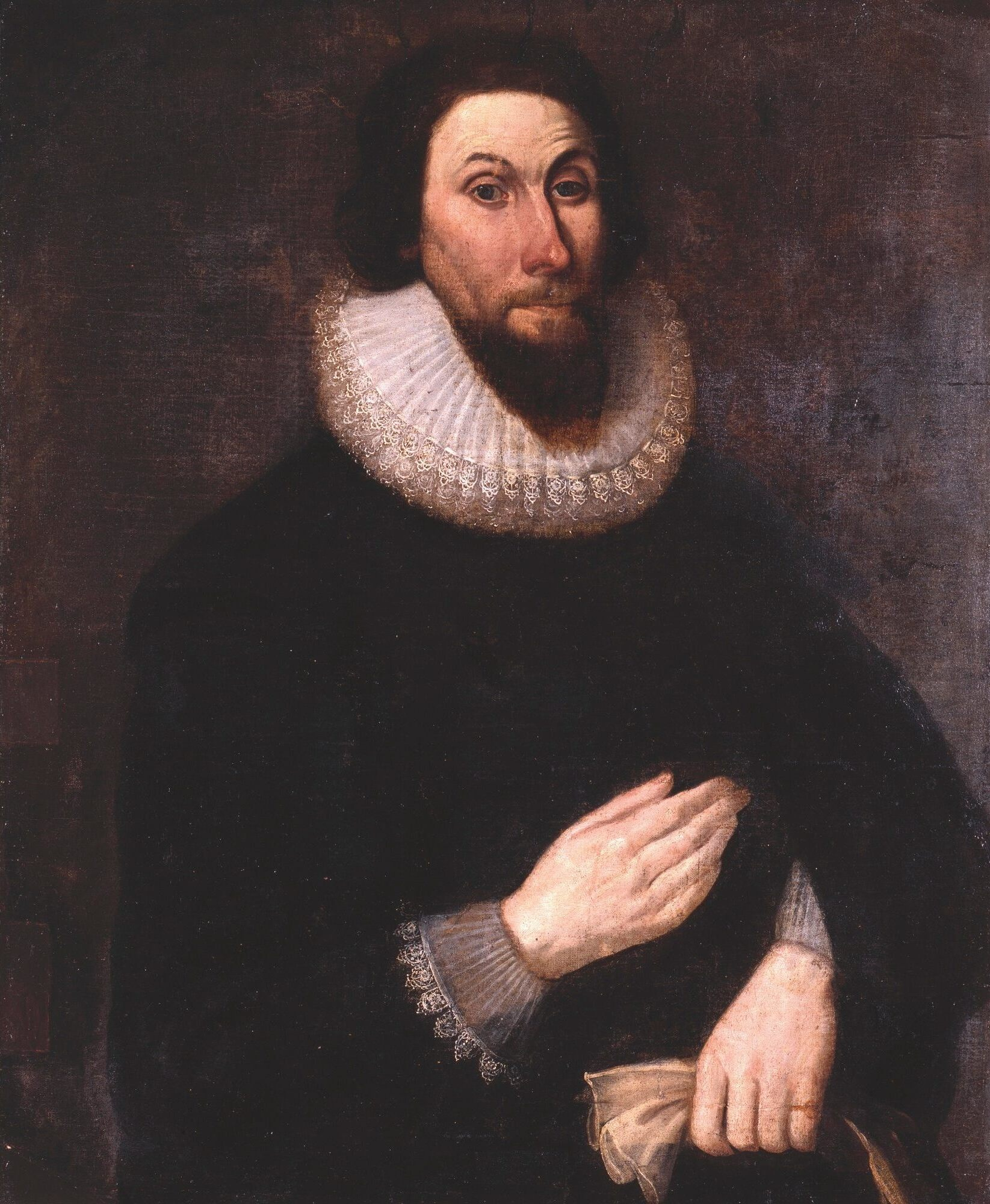
John Winthop, to whom the square is dedicated

The square is named for John Winthrop (1587/1588–1649), an English Puritan lawyer and one of the leading figures in founding the Massachusetts Bay Colony, the second major settlement in New England following Plymouth Colony.

== Design ==
Situated in front of the 1873-constructed One Winthrop Square, the columns on the building's façade were used as the inspiration for the square's paving pattern, which contains strips of granite that "project in varied ways into the space to define entry, seating areas and diagonal circulation."

A case study was undertaken in 2003 to determine whether the square and its two adjacent streets should be widened to make a better connection to Lincoln Street and improve the traffic flow from Devonshire Street to the South End.

== Businesses ==
The Boston Flower Exchange, founded in 1892, opened a flower market at the corner of Otis Street and Winthrop Square in February 1913. They launched the new location, in what was known as the Wholesale Flower District, with a reception and flower show.

=== Newspapers and publishers ===
The Atlantic Monthly had its Boston offices at 220 Devonshire Street in Winthrop Square in the 19th century. The magazine was established in the city in 1857. James R. Osgood and Company inherited The Atlantic Monthly and its office location.

In 1878, publishers Houghton, Osgood and Company were based in the square.

In early years of the 20th century, the pressrooms of Boston American were located here.

== Statue of Robert Burns ==
The square was home to a statue of Scottish poet Robert Burns for 44 years, having been moved from Boston's Back Bay Fens in 1975. It was returned to its original location in 2019.

== See also ==
- Winthrop Square, in nearby Charlestown
