= Hudson River Monster =

Creature in New York (U.S.) folklore

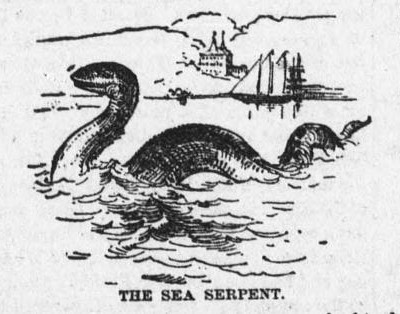
An unnamed illustrator's interpretation of the sea serpent reportedly spotted near Rondout, New York in August 1886. It appeared in multiple periodicals.

In New York folklore, the Hudson River Monster, popularly known as "Kipsy" or less commonly "Keepsie" or "Libby" (after the Statue of Liberty) is an aquatic serpentine monster reportedly spotted along the Hudson River and New York Harbor since 1886. The name "Kipsy" is believed to derive from Poughkeepsie, a city located along the river. The creature was first reported in a series of newspaper articles published in 1886, in which it is referred to simply as "the sea serpent."

== Background ==
Though many sources allege that "Kipsy" was described in Native American legends or spotted by Henry Hudson's crew as the sailed up the Hudson River on the Halve Maen, none provide any documentation in support of these claims.

There was a long history of sea serpent sightings along the Atlantic coast preceding the Hudson River sightings. The most prominent of these occurred near Gloucester, Massachusetts in 1817, inspiring the Linnaean Society of New England to formally describe the sea serpent under the scientific name Scoliophis atlanticus.

== 1886 sightings ==
The first published report of a sea-serpent in the Hudson River appears in the New York Times in 1886. The heading of the article ("In the Hudson This Time┃The Sea Serpent Disporting Himself Near Kingston") suggests that this initial sighting was not considered geographically or temporally distinct from prior sightings of sea serpents along the Atlantic coast.

Reports of the Hudson River sea serpent appeared frequently in newspapers in 1886, sometimes accompanied by attestations of the reporter's credibility or sobriety. Newspapers often reprinted each others accounts; reports initially published in local papers were reprinted in periodicals throughout the United States.

The creature was universally described as having a serpentine appearance. Descriptions of its size and coloration varied considerably.

August 30, 1886 reported in The New York Times

Several boatman and swimmers from Rondout, New York reported seeing part of a creature resembling an anaconda or water boa which measured around 55 feet in length and two feet in diameter. It was described as having a mottled light and dark brown pattern with a dirty white throat and a fin which began six feet behind the eyes and extended the length of the body. An article published in a Los Angeles Newspaper elaborates further, describing the serpent as being slimy, with a large mouth, eyes the size of hen's eggs, and leaving an oily residue in its wake. An uncredited illustration of the serpent was published in multiple periodicals the next month.

September 2, 1886 reported in The New York Herald

A man in charge of the wreck of the Daniel Drew, a steamboat which had recently sunk, reported seeing a seventy-five foot creature with a head the size of a flower barrel and "devilish" green eyes swimming north. It allegedly stopped to chase two boaters, who successfully escaped to shore.

September 2 & 3, 1886, reported in the New York Daily Tribune

The next reported sightings of the sea serpent occurred further upriver. A steamer captain reported catching a glimpse of the creature's body which he described as "as thick around as a smokestack" near Beeren Island, eleven miles south of Albany, New York. The captain and a local printer reportedly glimpsed the creature's head emerging from the water further upriver.

September 4, 1886 reported in The Hartford Daily Courant

Two boatmen report seeing a lead-colored creature around 30-feet long with a large flat head and disproportionately large eyes. They recount that they fired two shots that hit the creature but did not appear to injure it.

September 5, 1886 reported in The Meriden Journal

A night watchman in New York City reported seeing the head of a serpent emerge from the water. He described it as "greenish-blue" with short hair and red eyes the size of his fists.

September 10, 1886 reported in The New York Sun

A Lieutenant standing on the 27th Street pier spotted a dirty-gray creature around 100m in length and 18 inches thick at its thickest point.

September 11, 1886 reported in The Hartford Daily Courant

Multiple observers near Savin Rock, Connecticut reported seeing various portions of a blue sea serpent surface above the water.

October 12, 1886, reported in The New York Times

Three men sailing near Bridgeport, Connecticut observed a serpent-like monster 100 feet in length with three lumps on its back.

October 17, 1886, reported in The New York Times

A sloop captain in Bay Shore, Long Island reported passing within 300 feet of a sea serpent, which he described as being four feet in circumference with arms or flippers around four feet long.

December 31, 1886, reported in The New York Times

A schooner captain in Tivoli, New York reported seeing a terracotta-colored animal with two eyes "nearly as big as saucers" split the ice.

== Public reaction ==
The sea serpent was largely an object of curiosity rather than fear. Newspapers published articles by scientists debating the veracity, identify, and possible origins of the creature. Some suggested that it might be an plesiosaur or other extant prehistoric creature.

The sea serpent was frequently referenced in a humorous way, often in connection with current events. One tongue-in-cheek article urged the scientific community to explore whether the serpent could be responsible for a recent earthquake while another expressed hope that it would "show himself at the mouth of Newtown Creek and perhaps frighten that other monster, the Standard Oil Company..."

Other jokes centered around the serpent's perceived value as a tourist attraction. A humorous advertisement published in an October 1886 issue of the Kansas newspaper The Evening Tribune published an offer by the showman P.T. Barnum of a $20,000 reward:

"...for the skin of the sea-serpent which, it is claimed, has been cavorting around the Atlantic coast. Perhaps the scalp of the hotel-keeper who started the story would answer as well."

Though framed as a joke, Barnum's offer appears to have been genuine as he reached out to a taxidermist for advice on how to preserve the sea serpent should it be captured.

== Proposed explanations ==
=== Driftwood ===
In September 1886, The Brooklyn Union published an account which attributed the initial sightings of the serpent near Rondout to a drifting log. The log reportedly measured around 30 feet in length, was covered in knots which resembled fins, and had a protruding root at one end somewhat resembling a head and neck.

=== Wildlife ===
Another common explanation for the reports is the sighting of an unusually large aquatic creature. The Atlantic sturgeon, which can grow up to 16 feet long and weigh up to 800lbs, has been cited as a possible source for many aquatic monster myths. The fish typically live in deep waters, and thus rarely come into contact with humans. In 2018, sonar scans revealed a 14-foot long Atlantic sturgeon near Hyde Park, New York.

Another commonly proposed candidate for the Hudson River monster, the manatee, can measure up to 15 feet. Though manatees are more commonly found in warmer waters they have been spotted in the Hudson Valley. In 2006, a manatee estimated to weigh 1000lbs swam up the Hudson River. Unlike the sturgeon, which was detected only on sonar scans, the manatee was conspicuous to casual observers and was spotted by boaters in several locations along the river.

While neither animal measures up to the reported dimensions of the Hudson River monster, the size reported for the creature could be a product of exaggeration or an optical illusion. The apparent dimensions of an underwater object can be magnified by refraction, leading observers to overestimate its size. A group of large schooling fish or other marine creatures swimming in a line could give the impression of a single large serpentine creature.

=== Deliberate hoax ===
An anonymously authored article published in The Boston Daily Globe in November 1886 recounted the alleged confesion of an inventor called Dr. William A. Dean who claimed to have created the serpent as a hoax for commercial gain. According to the article, the serpent was a rubber model which could be taken apart in sections. Dr. Dean supposedly anchored the serpent near local hotels to attract guests in exchange for a fee. The author of the article may have drawn inspiration from another sea serpent hoax reportedly perpetrated by a hotelier in 1955 on Silver Lake in upstate New York.

== Post-1886 sightings ==
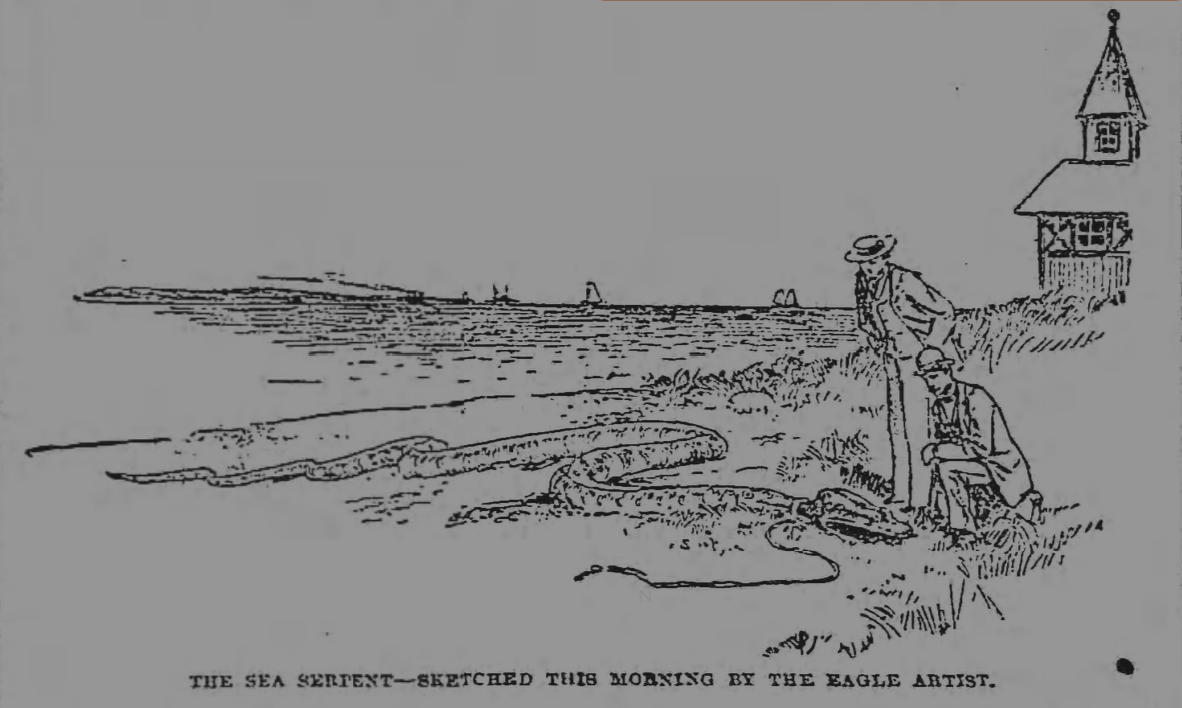
A sketch of the corpse of the sea serpent reportedly captured and killed near Blackwell Island, published by the Brooklyn Daily Eagle.

Though sightings of sea serpents in the Hudson River and New York Harbor decreased after 1886, the serpent continued to make routine appearances in local newspapers. In July 31, 1895 The Brooklyn Eagle reported that the sea serpent had been killed by a group of men the prior night after drifting ashore on Blackwell's Island. A local physician who examined the creature expressed doubt about this story as the creature appeared to have been dead for some time.

The alleged sea serpent was described as having yellowish scales, stiff, bony fins, a flat head with gray-brown eyes, and a long sword-shaped tongue or fang. It was estimated to be a mere 25-feet long with a maximum diameter of eight inches. The article noted:

"In spite of an ugly oblong head six or eight inches in length and two rows of ferocious looking teeth the sea serpent or snake or whatever zoologists will find it out to be, does not realize the dreams of those who have seen sea serpents before."

A New York Times article published in June of 1899 reported a sighting by bathers of a creature described by some witnesses as a shark, and by others as a sea serpent. The creature reportedly approached and pursued the bathers.

More recent sightings in the Hudson River have been reported on local radio and social media.

== In popular culture ==
References to Kipsy are most prominent in the Hudson Valley Region, where it has been represented in visual art and sculpture. Unlike more famous regional river monsters such as Champ and Nessie, it is not well known outside of its home waters.

Kipsy is briefly mentioned in the Booker Prize-winning novelist Salman Rushdie's novel Two Years Eight Months and Twenty-Eight Nights alongside other historical references:

"...the haunted gap-toothed Oldsmobiles mud-crusted on the shore, and darker secrets, the skeleton of the legendary Kipsy river-monster and the skulls of murdered Irish longshoremen..."

In 2016, Atlas Obscura included Kipsy on its list of "Lake Monsters of the United States."

== See also ==
- Gloucester sea serpent
- Chessie
