= Lyceum Theatre (Boston) =

Theatre in Boston, Massachusetts

Coordinates: 42°21′07″N 71°03′47″W

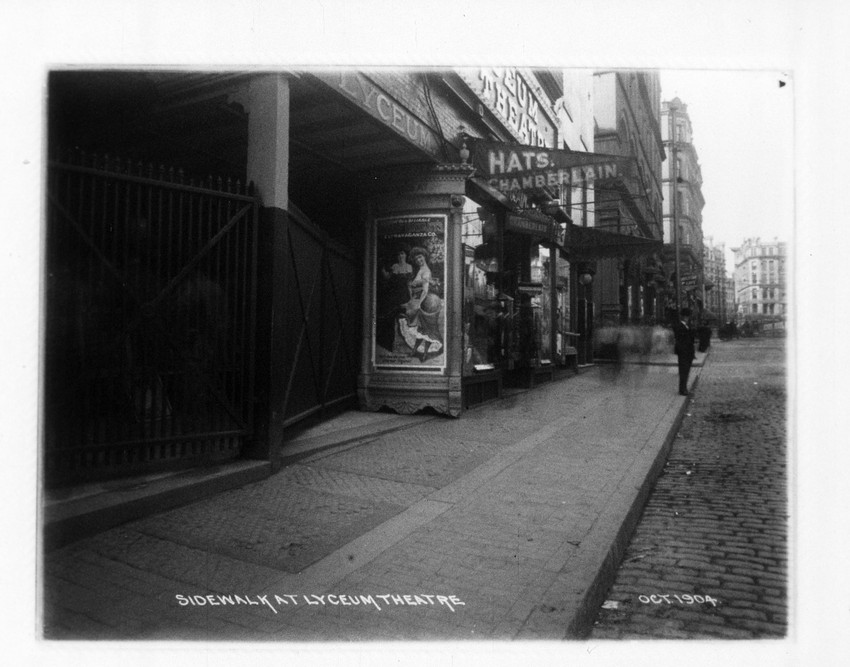
1904 photograph of the sidewalk outside the Lyceum Theatre, produced by the Boston Transit Commission

The Lyceum Theatre was in Boston, Massachusetts, located at 661–667 Washington Street, at the corner with Boylston Street. It opened as the Boylston Museum (also called the New Boylston Museum) in 1875 at 667 Washington Street. It operated as both a theatre and a dime museum. Its founder, George E. Lothrop, acquired the adjacent properties and greatly expanded the theatre. This expanded facility opened as the World's Museum (also called World's Theatre and the World's Museum, Menagerie and Aquarium) in 1885. In 1892, the theatre ceased to be a dime museum and was renamed the Lyceum Theatre after undergoing significant alterations. It was demolished in June 1908. The Gaiety Theatre was built on the same site in 1908.

== Boylston Museum (1875–1885) ==
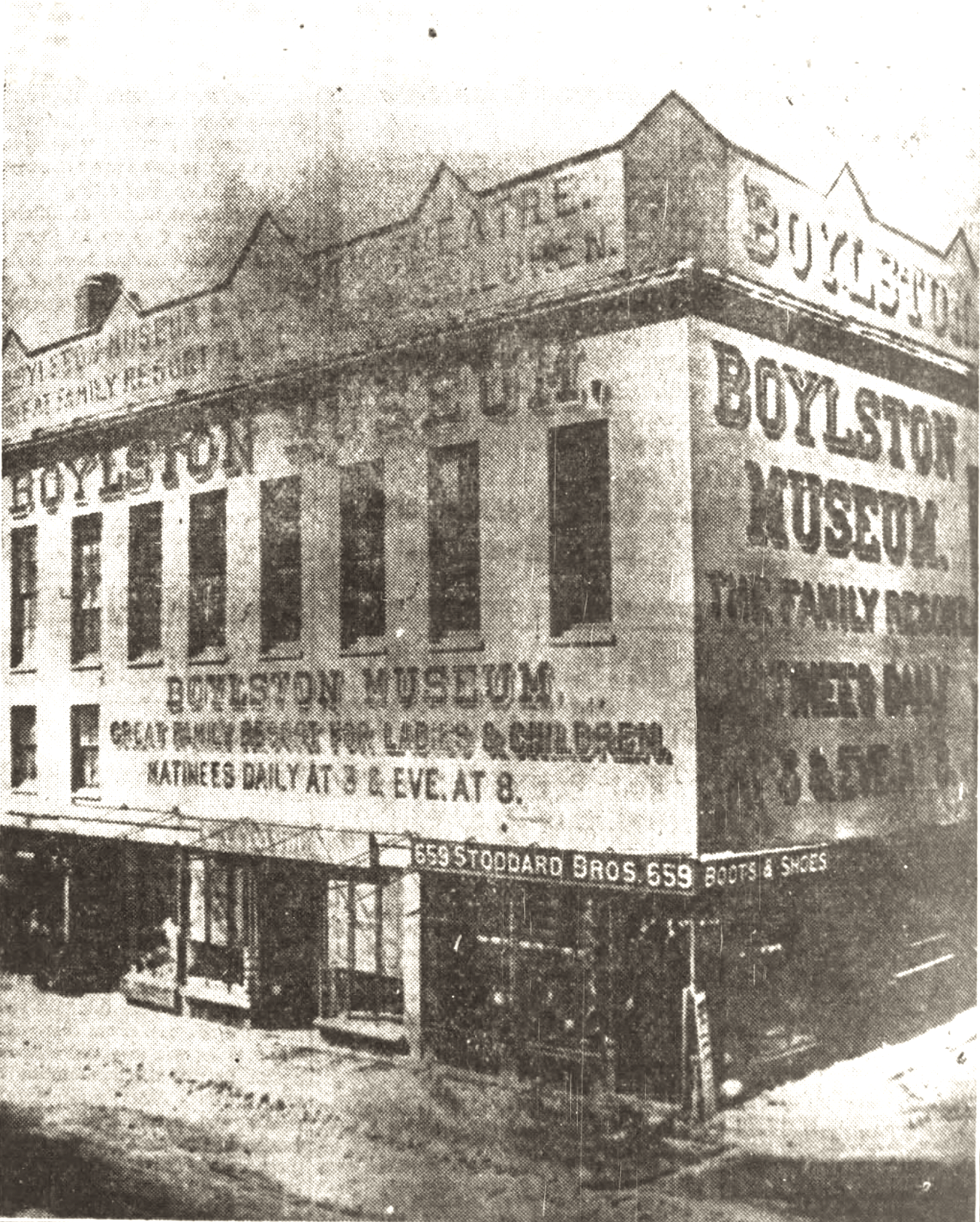
1875 photograph of the Boylston Museum

The Boylston Museum was founded by George E. Lothrop in 1875, at 667 Washington Street adjacent to Boylston Market. Lothrop was a graduate of Dartmouth Medical School who left a career as a physician to pursue a career in theatre management. A dime museum as well as a theatre, a review in The Boston Globe on May 14, 1875, described the site as a "cozy little theatrum" and that the museum contained a "collection of curiousities [that are] large and interesting". It also described the theatre as offering daily afternoon and evening performances with both dramas and variety entertainments as offerings.

The Boylston Museum operated primarily as a variety theatre during the vaudeville era. The theatre sat 930 people and it charged 10 to 50 cents for tickets to its performances. The actor Horace Lewis (1854–1905) made his professional debut at the Boylston Museum during its first year of operation, starring as Mr. Primrose in an 1875 production of A Tight Place. Singer Maggie Cline was also an early performer at the theatre who began her career on the Boylston stage. By 1876 advertisements for the Boylston Museum began referring to the museum as the New Boylston Museum and its theatre as the Star Novelty Theatre.

For the Christmas 1877 season the actress Sadie Martinot was engaged for performances. Martinot became a favorite performer for Boston audiences in minstrel shows staged at the Boylston. George M. Cohan's father, Jere Cohan, worked as a stage manager at the Boylston Museum, and the Four Cohans sometimes gave six shows a day at the Boylston's theatre. Denman Thompson performed a highly popular sketch at the theatre, "Uncle Josh", which he later developed into the longer play The Old Homestead, which for a period held the record for the longest-running play in the history of the American theatre.

Other vaudeville entertainers to appear at the Boylston Museum included comedian Neil Burgess; actors Charles L. Davis (1870–1920) and Charles H. Yale; and acrobat and singing actress Carrie Swain. The museum and theatre stopped operating in April 1885 in order to expand and transform the enterprise into the World's Theatre.

== World's Museum (1885–1892) ==
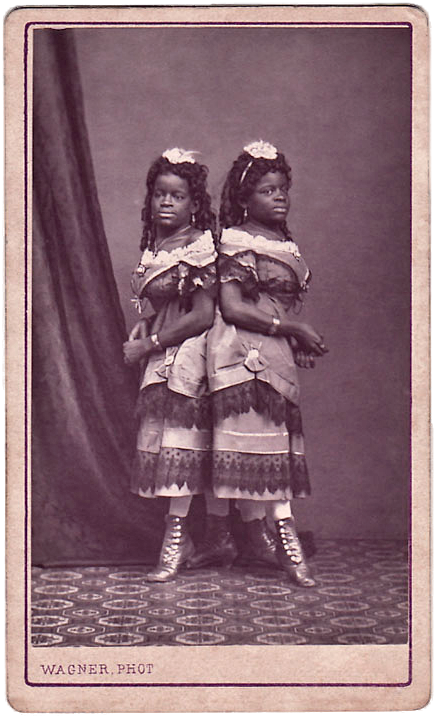
Conjoined twins Millie and Christine McKoy

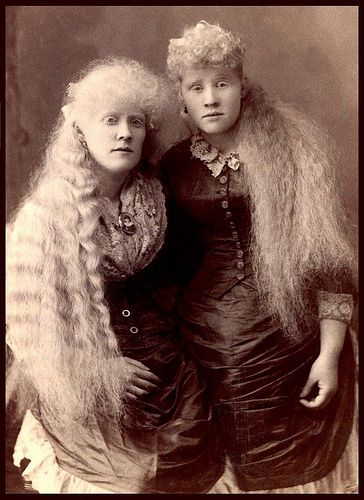
Albino sisters Florence and Mary Martin

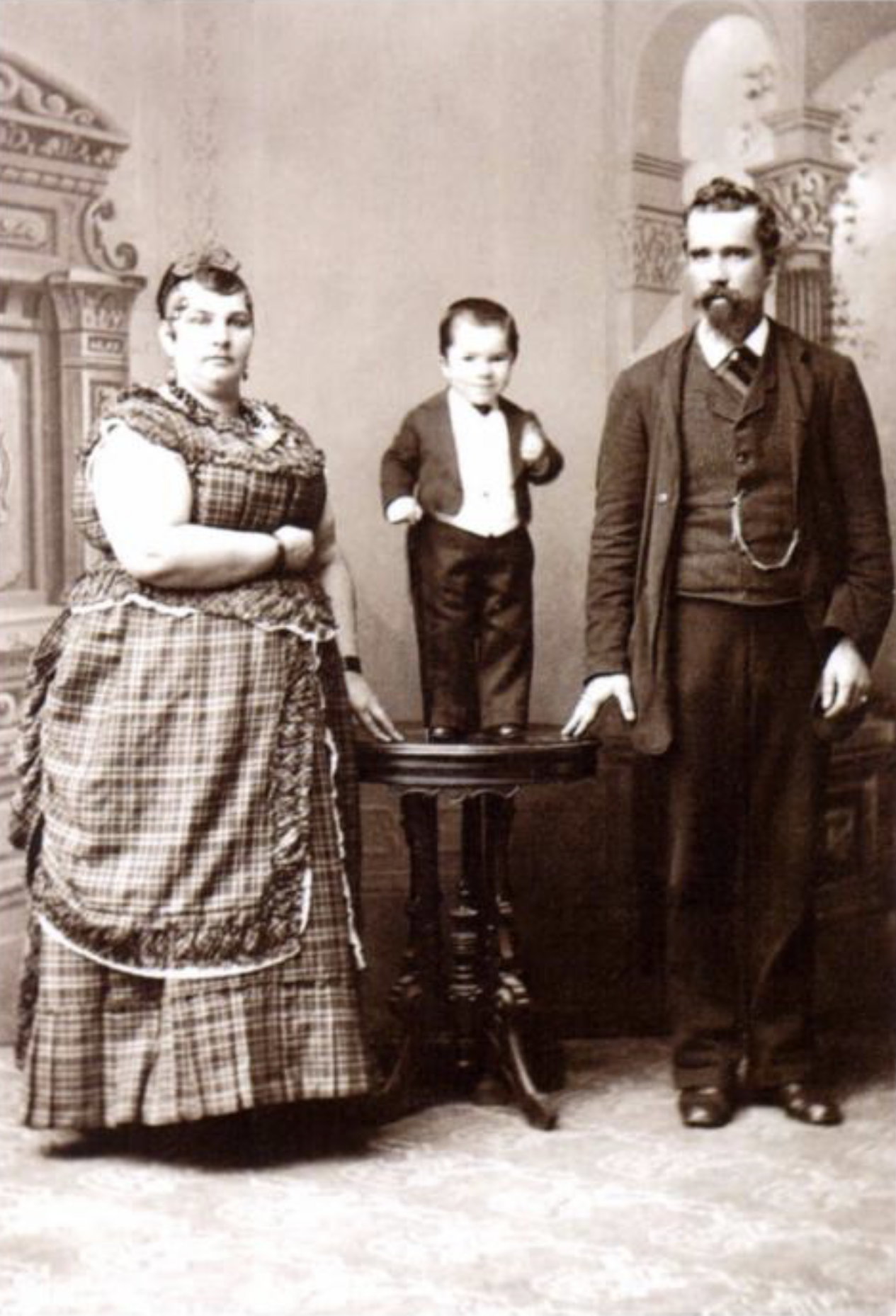
1882 photograph of dwarf General Willis Carver (center) with his parents. His mother Cora Carver (left) worked as a professional fat lady and was often displayed alongside her tiny son.

Lothrop decided to expand the size of his operation and acquired the 661, 663, and 665 Washington Street properties to significantly enlarge the size of both the theatre and the museum. The builder of the museum was H. Roberts. Asa Lowe & Co. did the mason work, the Chelmsford Foundry Co. did the iron work, artist J. A. Teeling painted several murals in the building, J. Kelley & Co. made stained-glass windows, Gill & Higgins provided French colored glass, and much of the interior design work was done by The Boston Wall Paper Co.

The much enlarged and essentially new facility reopened as the World's Museum, Menagerie, and Aquarium on Monday October 5, 1885. A variety program was presented in the theatre on opening day that featured African-American comedian Tom McIntosh, mentalist Madame Lee, singer Georgia Marsh, and many other performers of varying talents. It was reported that more than 50,000 people attended the museum during its first week of operation.

Extending an entire city block, the World's Museum consisted of four floors and could accommodate 7,000 people. It was wired with electricity and had many crystal chandeliers lit by colored lights. The first floor of the building contained a vestibule with a large fountain, a theatre that could seat 1,000 people, and an aquarium. The second floor consisted of two large halls containing a wide array of "curiosities".

The third floor consisted of a menagerie. The menagerie contained both animals on display in cages and performing animals. Some of the animals which performed included "Pendrinelli's trained monkeys", an elephant named Bijou who could perform tricks of varying kinds, "Baby Alice Dunbar and her den of performing snakes", and "Dr. Sawtell's Magnificent troupe of St. Bernards". Animals on display in the menagerie included sea lions, a leopard, sea turtles, a tapir, six flying foxes, monkeys, tigers, a lion, bears, alligators, parrots and other tropical birds, song birds from around the world, and several deer among other animals. A baby lion named Max was particularly popular with Boston children. A Boston Evening Transcript article on November 13, 1885, reported that it was the third largest collection of animals in the United States, with only the Central Park Zoo and the Philadelphia Zoo surpassing it in terms of animal numbers.

The World's Museum also included a freak show in its "hall of curiosities" with performers that the museum described as an "albino", "midgets", "lobster boy", "The Human Skeleton", "The Armless Man", and other people possessing biological rarities. Among the performers at the opening were Count Primo Magri, General Tom Thumb and Mrs. General Tom Thumb. The museum would rotate in other people. The giantess Lottie Grant and the conjoined twins Millie and Christine McKoy, billed as "The Two-Headed Nightingale", joined the roster of performers in November 1885. In February 1886 professional fat lady Madame Carver appeared alongside her son, the tiny person General Willis Carver in the hall. Other performers that worked in the hall of curiosities included tattooed lady Lillian Marco, tiny people Jennie Quigley and Major Tot, giant Colonel Routh Goshen, Captain Harry Decoursey, "The Tattooed Man", Krao, "The Greatest of Living Curiousities", albino sisters Florence and Mary Martin, the singing Seven Sutherland Sisters who all had very long hair, Belle Moody, "the Human Billiard Ball", and the bearded lady Annie Jones.

As with the former Boylston Museum, multiple variety act performances were presented daily and there was a rotating cadre of vaudeville entertainers engaged for these performances to keep audiences returning to the museum. Some notable performers who appeared at the World's Museum included comedian Sam Lucas, song and dance comedians Sheridan & Flynn, the multi-instrumentalist and singer Lillie Western, Grace Courtland, "The Witch of Wall Street", actors Palmer and Hayden, actress Ada Melrose, and the contortionist and clown Harry Wentworth.

The museum would also sometimes offer burlesque parodies of popular stage works of the period, such as Gilbert and Sullivan's The Mikado in December 1885. This production was later presented to accompany a large "Japanese bazaar" installed at the museum in February 1886. That same month opera singer Blanche Corelli came to the World's Theatre and brought an entire opera company with her. They performed Edmond Audran's La mascotte with Corelli in the title role to large crowds. This was followed by performances of H.M.S. Pinafore. Other legitimate theatre works presented at the World's Theatre included a production of Dion Boucicault's Andy Blake: or, The Irish Diamond in March 1886.

By July 1892 the theatre had been sold to F. P. Clough and was no longer in operation.

== Lyceum Theatre (1892–1908) ==
In July 1892 F. P. Clough began making significant alterations to the former World's Theatre building to transform it into the Lyceum Theatre. The walls of the theatre were rebuilt with new brick, and much work was done to improve the building's ventilation;. The number of exits were increased and careful attention was made to make the theatre fire proof; including the use of much more iron than in the World's Theatre. This included ornamental iron panels used as decorations on the walls of the theatre. The theatre also included white and gold frescos that were "relieved with blue and buff". The stage was 35 feet long, 35 feet wide, and 45 feet high. Austin Gibbon was hired as the theatre's first general manager and F.W. Johnson its first music director.

The theatre opened as the Lyceum Theatre on September 19, 1892. Its opening performance was a variety show which starred the blackface performer Billy Lester, the Irish comedians Spencer and Quigg, Spanish bolero dancers, jugglers, and a wide array of other acts. The theatre continued to periodically host vaudeville type performances. Some notable vaudeville entertainers to appear at the theatre included the comedy duo Flynn and Sheridan.

In addition to being used for vaudeville performances, the theatre was also used for legitimate theatre. In its first year of operation it was used by the Boston Comic Opera for its 1892–1893 season, and presented Native-American actress and playwright Gowongo Mohawk in her play Wep-ton-no-mah;

In early 1907 the Lyceum Theatre was occupied by the Rice & Barton's Gaiety Company. Later that year the theatre was occupied by a show organized by Sam A. Scribner which closed on May 16, 1908.

In June 1908 it was announced that the Lyceum Theatre would be demolished to make way for the construction of the Gaiety Theatre. A report in The Boston Globe on June 10, 1908, stated that some of the smaller adjacent properties to the Lyceum Theatre had already been demolished to make way for the theatre, and that the Lyceum Theatre was scheduled for demolition in the next few days with portions of the structure already been torn down.
