= Queenie Foote =

American performer (1857–1937)

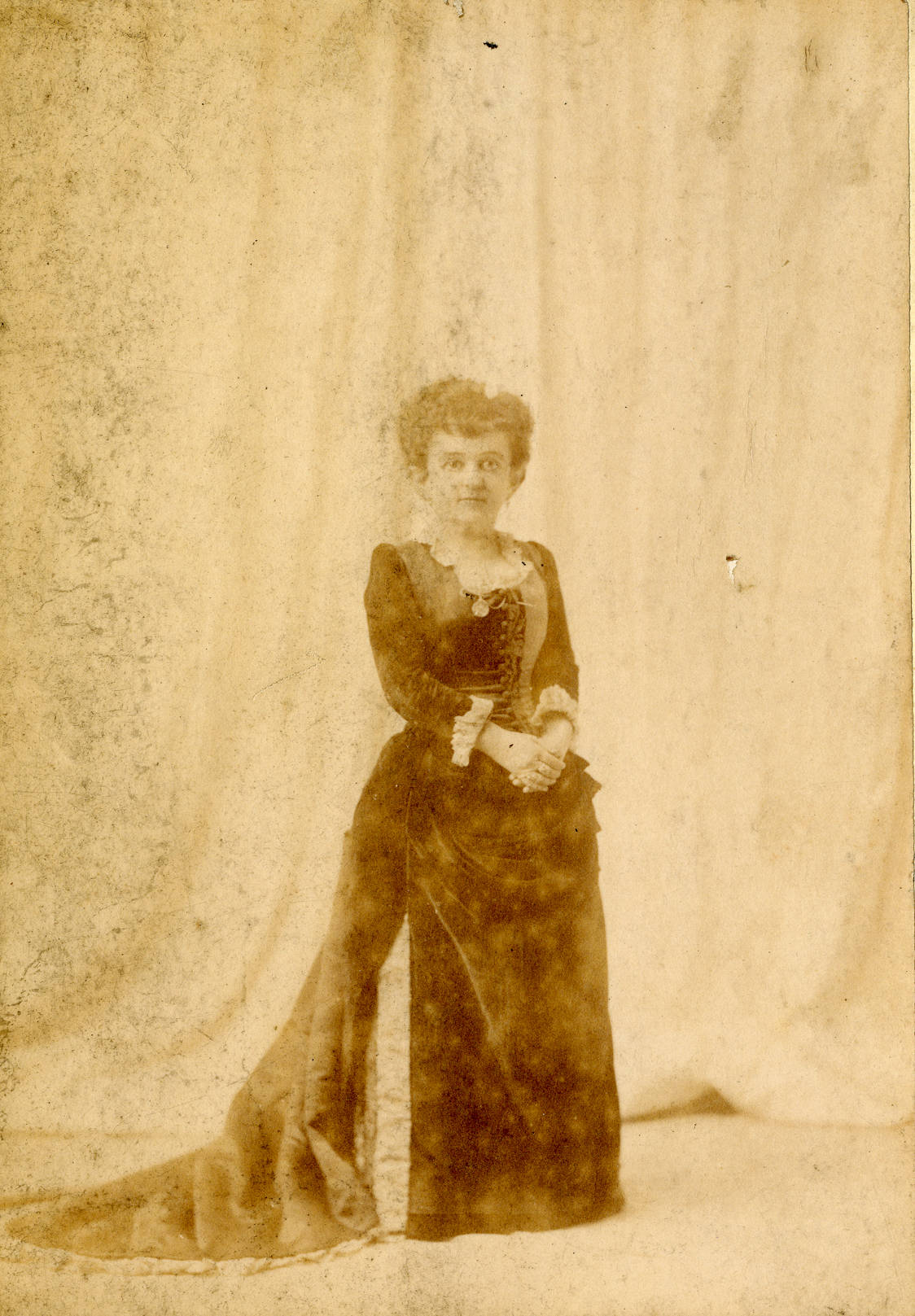
- Queenie Foote, from an 1890 photograph.
- Born: Eliza S. Nestel; 1857; Fort Wayne, Indiana, US
- Died: April 25, 1937 (aged 79–80); Fort Wayne, Indiana, US
- Occupation: Performer

Queenie Foote (1857 – April 25, 1937), born Eliza S. Nestel, was an American performer, sometimes also billed as The Fairy Queen.

== Early life ==
Eliza S. Nestel was from Fort Wayne, Indiana, the daughter of blacksmith Daniel Nestel and Henrietta Goebel Nestel. Both Nestel and her brother, Charles, had dwarfism. Her parents immigrated to the United States from the Kingdom of Prussia; they were both quite tall. She began making public appearances as a child with her brother Charles under the management of William Ellinger, and with their father as chaperone.

== Career ==
Foote and her brother Charles W. Nestel, known as "Commodore Foote", toured in the United States, Canada, Mexico, and Europe. They met with Abraham Lincoln at the White House in February 1864. While in Washington, she was the object of an anatomical study, along with her brother and others.

They met Queen Victoria. They were seen with the Lilliputian Comic Opera Company, working with other performers, including fellow little people Commodore Nutt, Admiral Dot, and Jennie Quigley. Charles rejected the "sideshow" label, saying "My sister and I played only the best of concert and dramatic stages, and neither of us every played in any circus or sideshow," adding "We were actors, not freaks."In 1895 she helped another brother sell jewelry in Ohio. She was injured in 1909; by 1912 they had retired to Fort Wayne.

== Personal life ==
Nestel died in 1937, aged 80 years, a few days after her brother died.
