= Jennie Quigley =

Scottish sideshow performer

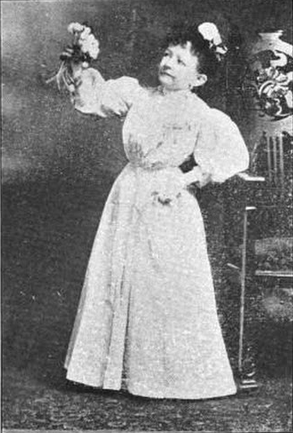
- Quigley from a 1914 publication
- Born: August 20, 1850; Glasgow, Scotland
- Died: March 11, 1936 (aged 85); Chicago, Illinois, U.S.
- Occupation: Sideshow performer
- Known for: Billed as "The Queen of Scotland" and "the Smallest Lady in the World" by P. T. Barnum.

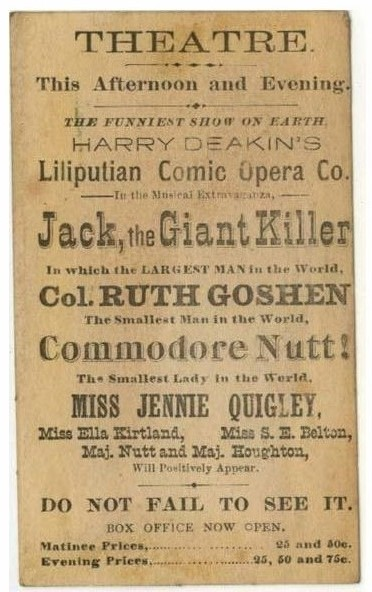
Playbill for Jack the Giant Killer, featuring Jennie Quigley

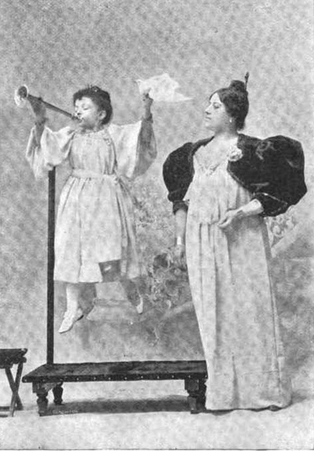
Jennie Quigley and hypnotist "Madame Mozart", from an 1897 publication.

Jennie Quigley (August 20, 1850 – March 11, 1936) was a Scottish sideshow performer in the United States. She was billed as "The Queen of Scotland" and "the Smallest Lady in the World" by P. T. Barnum.

== Early life ==
Jennie Quigley was born in Glasgow, the daughter of James Quigley and Jane Kerr Quigley. She moved to Brooklyn, New York with her mother and brother in 1861.

== Career ==
Quigley was hired by P. T. Barnum in 1863, while she was still quite young and not finished growing. He publicized her as "the Queen of Scotland" and "the Smallest Woman in the World." Early in her career she was described as being under two feet tall; at age 28, she was said to be 36 inches tall; by the time she retired in 1917, she was 41 inches tall.

Quigley toured with the Lilliputian Comic Opera Company from 1877 until at least 1901, working with other sideshow performers, including fellow little people Commodore Nutt, Charles W. Nestel ("Commodore Foote"), Admiral Dot, and Eliza Nestel ("Queenie Foote"). In 1887 her likeness was featured in advertisements for the "World's Museum" in Boston. After meeting hypnotist "Madame Mozart" in Denver, the two women devised an act together in 1897. In 1933 and 1934, though long retired, she was part of the "Midget Village" exhibit at Chicago's Century of Progress exposition, and celebrated her 83rd birthday in a large public gathering, as part of the festivities.

At least one audience member named a child after Jennie Quigley.

== Personal life ==
Jennie Quigley was initiated in 1876 as a member of the Order of the Eastern Star in Chicago. She died in 1936, aged 85 years, in the Chicago home of her nephew, Victor Quigley.
