= Hudson River (disambiguation) =

The Hudson River is a major river in the state of New York in the United States.

Hudson River may also refer to:

- Hudson River (Georgia)

== See also ==
- Hudson River Monster
- Hudson River Park
- Hudson River School
- Hudson River Trading
- Hudson River Wind Meditations
