= Linnaean Society of New England =

The Linnaean Society of New England (1814–1822) was established in Boston, Massachusetts, to promote natural history. The society organized a natural history museum and also arranged lectures and excursions for its members. In 1817 it became involved in the Gloucester sea serpent debate. Although the society itself did not last, its initial energy and rapid accomplishments helped shape the growing field of natural history in the early years of the United States.

== History ==
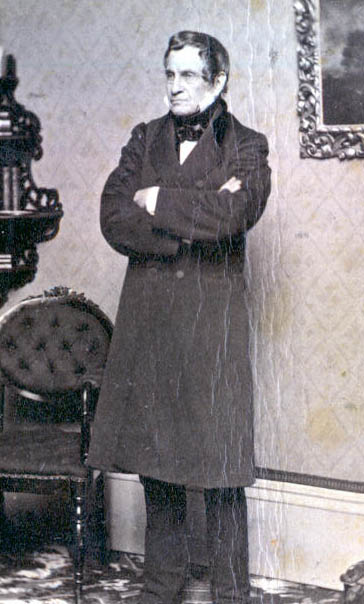
Jacob Bigelow

The society began December 8, 1814, "at the room of Dr. Jacob Bigelow." Founders included Bigelow; Walter Channing; Ezekiel D. Cushing; James Freeman Dana; George Hayward; LaFayette Perkins; Octavius Pickering; William Smith Shaw; Nathaniel Tucker; John Ware; and John White Webster. John Davis served as president. "Meetings were held weekly, on Saturday evenings. The members were divided into 6 classes: viz., for minerals; for plants and vegetables; for quadrupeds and birds; for fishes, reptiles, and serpents; for insects; and for vermes, corals, madrepores, &c." Initially, the society had a room "in Joy's Buildings" in Boston; they soon moved to Boylston Market. In January 1815, the society agreed to call itself the "Linnaean Society of New England" (instead of its previous name, "New-England Society for the Promotion of Natural History.") It officially incorporated in June 1820.

Affiliates of the society included: Thomas G. Chase; Parker Cleaveland; Samuel Luther Dana; Henry Alexander Scammell Dearborn; Oliver Fiske; Francis Calley Gray; Samuel Latham Mitchill; Nathan Read; and William J. Walker.

=== Excursions ===
In addition to meetings, the society organized relevant excursions. In the summer of 1816, members travelled to the mountains in New Hampshire and Vermont. "They ascertained the height of the Monadnock to be 3,450 feet; its summit composed of micaceous schistus. The Ascutney 3,106 feet, its summit of granite. The White Mountains 6,230 feet, the summit of gneiss, the sides micaceous schistus. The limit of forest trees at the height of 4,423 feet. These heights were ascertained by barometrical observations. They found few interesting minerals, but discovered 3 or 4 new species of plants."

=== Museum ===
Shortly after the formation of the society, it shared with the public its plans to create a museum of natural history. "The society, unwilling to raise expectations which might not be realized, or to announce objects beyond their power to effect, have chosen for the present to confine their views principally to the collection of a regular and systematick Museum of Natural History, in which Animals, Plants, and Minerals shall be kept in a good state of preservation, designated by their scientific and ordinary names, and arranged according to their classes and natural affinities. It is hoped that a collection thus formed, will be useful to students, and may hereafter be instrumental in throwing some light on the natural history of this country."

==== Solicitations for the collection ====
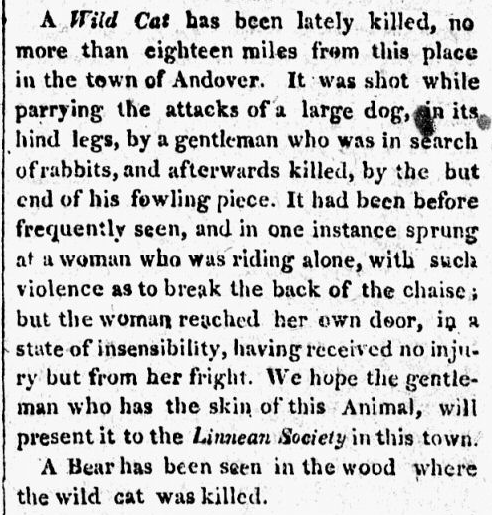
Item in the Boston Weekly Messenger, 1817, on a recently killed wildcat, suitable for donation to the Linnaean Society

The collection of the museum grew by donations from members and supporters. It was hoped that travellers abroad would bring back specimens. Society members "particularly request masters of vessels and other gentlemen bound on sea voyages, to preserve for them such curiosities as may fall in their way."" In addition, the new society wrote to their contacts abroad. Society members "have ... opened a considerable correspondence with a view to obtaining foreign specimens. The chief objects which they are desirous to possess are minerals, plants, and fresh seeds of rare species, quadrupeds, birds in pairs with their nests and eggs, fishes, serpents, insects, shells, coral, &c.""

It also was hoped that locals at home would contribute "birds, fish, &c. the common, and especially the rare, which are now and then brought to a town for sale. Many valuable articles have already been obtained in this manner, and by offering a trifling pecuniary inducement, individuals might be enabled to procure others which are not used for food, but which are very interesting to the naturalist." Indeed, "persons residing in the interiour of the country will confer an obligation on the society, by sending any ... objects which may appear to them curious or unusual. ... Printed directions for preserving birds, fishes, quadrupeds, plants, &c. may be received, gratis, at the Boston Atheneum, Tremont-street."

A newspaper notice of July 1820 advised the public that donations of natural history specimens could be dropped off at a drug store on Central Street. "The friends of this institution are informed that its members will receive and preserve specimens in the various departments of history, and for the convenience of those who have specimens to present, Mr. Thomas G. Chase, druggist, no.7, Central-street, has obligingly offered to receive them at his store. A note left with him, stating where specimens intended for the museum are deposited, will be duly attended to."

==== Specimens obtained ====
"Among the donations, the first one specified was a likeness of Mr. Roscoe, presented by Mr.Francis Boott. Commodore Stewart, of the frigate Constitution presented 2 living tigers. These tigers were somehow lost. ... A living bear from Commodore Chauncey; Chinese insects from B.P. Tilden; corals from Dr. Swift; minerals from Vesuvius; birds from France; birds from Africa; a series of English game-birds; a caribou; and, above all ... 'the most interesting and valuable specimen the country affords; namely, a large species of deer, commonly called the elk.'"

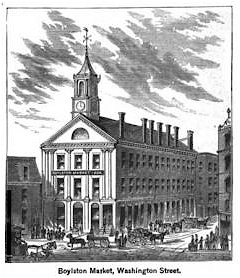

The museum itself, located in Boylston Hall, was open to the public: "strangers and others can have free access on application to any member or officer of the society." According to a contemporary description:

Among the quadrupeds may be mentioned the Lion, Tiger, Leopard, Catamount, Wolf, Bear, Stag, Sea-Elephant, and a great number of smaller species, principally native. The birds amount to nearly three hundred in number, and consist of elegant species in every order, and of every size, from the Albatross and the large Sea-Eagle of North America, to the minutest Humming birds of Cayenne. A majority of the birds are natives of this country, but there are many beautiful species from tropical countries ... The fishes are prepared in uniform half specimens fixed upon a white ground, and afford a fine display, being sufficiently numerous to nearly cover one end of the hall. The insects and shells amounting to some thousands in number, include many rare and elegant species, both native and foreign, and among them may be mentioned, a fine collection of insects from China, and of shells from the Isle of France and Calcutta. The mineralogical specimens already fill four large cabinets. ... The whole collection, with the exception of the fishes and a few other specimens, have been inclosed at a great expense, in mahogany cases with glass fronts. ... The specimens have been prepared by members of the society, and by an artist employed for the purpose [i.e. M. Duchesne].

=== Sea serpent ===
In 1817 the society investigated reports of sightings of an extraordinary "sea serpent" north of Boston, around Gloucester and Cape Ann, Massachusetts. Members of the society circulated systematic questionnaires, and wrote up a scientifically-informed report, published the same year. The report included information on Erik Pontoppidan's Norway sea snake, and on a smaller Cape Ann sea animal actually examined, "a remarkable serpent, supposed to be the progeny of the great serpent." To accommodate its findings the society established a new genus: Scoliophis Atlanticus. The smaller specimen was exhibited publicly.

At the time, controversy raged over the society's report. For example: "With respect to the little animal which was exhibited by Capt. Beach, and on which a committee of the Boston Linnaean Society established a new genus, under the imposing title of Scoliophis, concluding it to be the young of the sea-serpent, I understand that a celebrated French naturalist, now in Philadelphia, has ascertained that it is a common land snake of the U. States, of a harmless species, and that the undulations of the spine were merely the effect of disease." The editor of the Philadelphia newspaper that had printed this item also published his own remarks: "the evidence of the existence of the Sea-Monster is conclusive and irresistable." Eventually, experts concluded that the Linnaean Society's findings were incorrect. What had been thought to be a new species was in fact a black snake – Coluber constrictor.

=== Dissolution ===
The society faded out due to members' other priorities. In 1822 they agreed to "suspend the meetings, give up the rooms, and place the collection, or such part of it as can be preserved, in some place where it may occasion no further expense to the Society. ... The perishable specimens, such as stuffed skins and specimens in alcohol, were given to Mr. Greenwood, the proprietor of the New-England Museum." The remainder of the collection was offered to the Boston Athenaeum, which declined; and then to Harvard College, which accepted the offer and its terms. However, it soon became clear that Harvard would not fulfill the terms of the agreement. In 1830 the former society's specimens were reclaimed (--"a few empty glazed cases, or containing dilapidated monkeys and birds"--) and given to the newly formed Boston Society of Natural History.
