= Calvary Methodist Church =

Historic church in Massachusetts, United States

- U.S. National Register of Historic Places
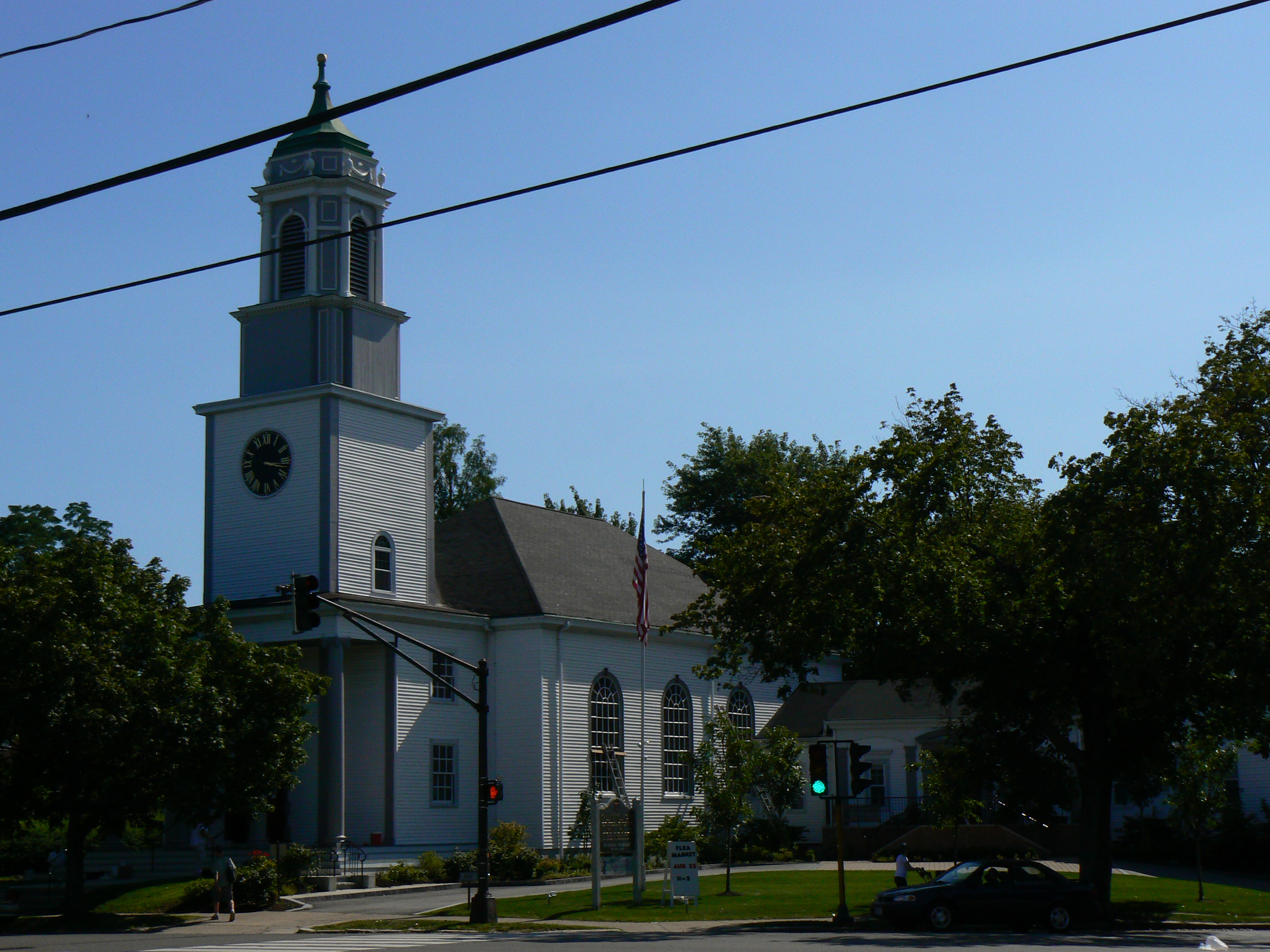
- A photo of the church, taken in 2008

- Location within Massachusetts Location within the United States
- Location: 300 Mass. Ave., Arlington, Massachusetts
- Coordinates: 42°24′33″N 71°8′49″W
- Area: less than one acre
- Built: 1923
- Architect: Multiple
- Architectural style: Greek Revival
- NRHP reference No.: 83003433
- Added to NRHP: June 23, 1983

Calvary Methodist Church is a historic Methodist church building at 300 Massachusetts Avenue in Arlington, Massachusetts. Built in 1919-23, the building is a near replica of Boston's King's Chapel, executed in wood. Its tower is topped by a belfry designed by architect Charles Bulfinch in 1809 and built for use on Boylston Market; it was rescued from demolition and given to the church in 1921. The building was listed on the National Register of Historic Places in 1983.

== Description and history ==
The Calvary Methodist Church is located on the southwest side of Massachusetts Avenue, southeast of Arlington center. It is a rectangular wood frame structure, with a projecting vestibule and tower. The main block has a hipped roof, and its side walls have four round-arch windows. The projecting is fronted by four Ionic columns, with a square stage above that houses a clock with a single face facing front, and small round windows on the other three sides. This stage is topped by a balustrade, and a flush-boarded stage with wide projecting sections and a dentillated cornice. Above this is an octagonal belfry, with four wide sides housing round-arched louvered openings with engaged columns at the corners. A stepped-back octagonal section tops the belfry, with a concave roof at the very top. A parish house, built in 1953, is attached to the church by a narrow passage.

The Methodist congregation first met in Arlington in 1916, and a plan for construction of a church for it soon followed. The present building was designed by James Macnaughton and William Perry, and construction began in 1919. The congregation had difficulty keeping up with the construction costs, and the builder threatened to sell off the partially-finished building for use as a theater. A town-wide appeal raised sufficient funds to cover the costs, and the building was completed in 1923. During the design process, Macnaughton had learned of Charles Bulfinch's planned cupola for Boston's King's Chapel, which was never executed. He learned of the existence of a Bulfinch-designed cupola that had been installed on the Boylston Market, a Bulfinch design built in 1810 and torn down in 1887. The cupola had been removed in 1886 and purchased by a brewery in Charlestown, which was itself slated for demolition after closing due to Prohibition. The owner agreed to donate the cupola to the church, on condition that its origin be properly credited.

== See also ==
- National Register of Historic Places listings in Arlington, Massachusetts
