= Sadie Martinot =

American actress (1861–1923)

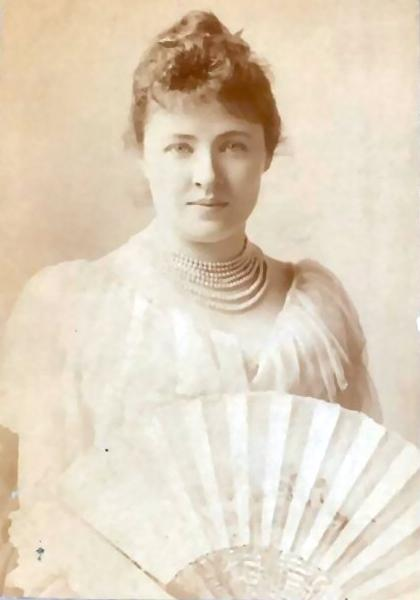
- Sadie Martinot, c. 1880s
- Born: Sarah Frances Marie Martinot; August 19, 1861; New York City, New York, U.S.
- Died: May 7, 1923 (aged 61); Ogdensburg, New York, U.S.
- Occupations: Actress and singer
- Spouses: Fred Stinson (m. 1879; died 1895) Louis F. Nethersole (m. 1901)

Sarah Frances Marie Martinot (August 19, 1861 – May 7, 1923) was an American actress and soprano singer who performed on stage in dramas, musical comedy and comic opera. Her career began at the age fifteen as Cupid in Ixion; or, the Man at the Wheel and, but for a few years absence, she remained active on stage in America and abroad until 1908. She was the first to play Hebe in an American production of H.M.S. Pinafore, the first Katrina in the comic opera Rip Van Winkle and the first to play the title role in an English adaptation of the operetta Nanon. Late in her life Martinot fell victim to mental illness and spent her last few years confined to psychiatric institutions.

== Early life ==
She was born Sarah Frances Marie Martinot in New York City on December 19, 1861, the daughter of William Alexander and Mary Lydia (née Randall) Martinot. Her father was the son of John P. Martinot, a French immigrant who founded a successful wholesale firm dealing in imported silk products. William Martinot worked for his father's firm and had served in the American Civil War and later as a New York City police detective who once brought charges of corruption against a NYPD police captain. Her mother was said to be of the family that once owned Randall's Island in Manhattan. Before taking to the stage at 15, Martinot was educated at area public schools and the Ursuline Convent in New Rochelle, New York. Some accounts have her birth name as Sally Martin or Sally Eagan, the daughter of an Irish-American single mother who worked hard to ensure her a good education. In March 1894 Martinot stated to the press that, though she would have been proud to have been raised under such a circumstance, she in fact was the daughter of Mary and William Alexander Martinot.

== Career ==
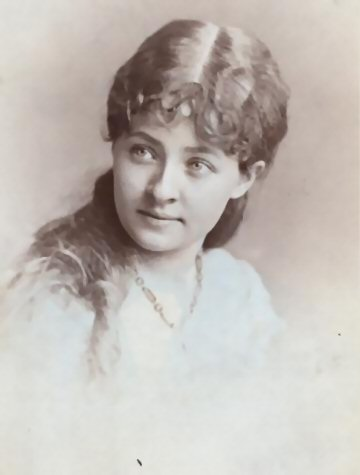
Sadie Martinot c. 1878

In 1876 Martinot joined Manhattan's Eagle Theatre as a $5-a-week walk-on player. Her debut came about in late August of that year when an injury prevented chorus girl Maude Branscombe from performing Cupid in that evening's performance of F. C. Burnand's Ixion. The next year she joined Adah Richmond's company at $18 a-week, touring in Chow Chow: or, A Tale of Pekin, in which she performed a popular imitation of Marie Aimee, singing Pretty as a Picture Later came a Christmas 1877 engagement at the Boylston Museum, Boston and a performance the following year at the city's Americus Club that led to an offer to join the Boston Museum stock company. That November she appeared at the Boston Museum in the original American production of Gilbert and Sullivan's H.M.S. Pinafore and, over the following few seasons, rose to be their leading soubrette. Martinot left The Boston Museum after actor-manager Dion Boucicault offered her a substantial raise to join him in England and her request for a modest salary adjustment was rejected by the Museum's management.

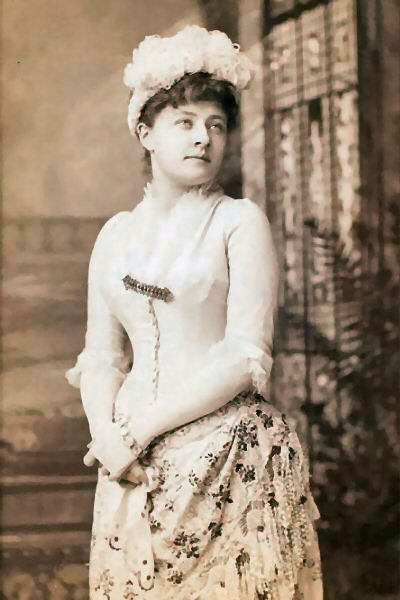
Sadie Martinot c. 1880s

Martinot made her London debut on Boxing Day, 1880, at the Alhambra Theatre as the Spirit of the Bracken in the three-act comic opera Mefistofele II. At the same theatre the following March, she played Celine in the Opéra bouffe Jeanne, Jeannette, et Jeanneton. On October 14, 1882, she created at the Royal Comedy Theatre, London, the role Katrina in the comic opera Rip Van Winkle.

By 1883 Martinot was back in New York with Boucicault for the inaugural season of his new Star Theatre (formerly Wallack's Theatre). Their first production premiered on March 26 with Boucicault's Vice Versa with Martinot in the role of Mrs. Clingstone Peach. Later one critic declared the piece a failure and Martinot a success. On April 12 the season continued with Martinot playing Moya in The Shaughraun; Dora on April 19 in The Omadhaun; and that May as Eily O'Connor in The Colleen Bawn.

At the Fifth Avenue Theatre in January 1884, Martinot played Portia in the farce Distinguished Gentleman and that August at the Union Square Theatre she was Florence Nightingale Fletcher in Queena. In April of the following year she played Sophie in Dakolar at the Lyceum Theatre and on June 29, 1885, at the Casino Theatre, she became the first to sing in English the part Nanon Patin in the operetta Nanon.

== Illness ==
In December 1885 Martinot sailed for an engagement in Florence, where after a short period she came down with a strain of malaria commonly called Roman Fever. A private train took her to Vienna, where she spent the next several years convalescing and, as her strength returned, pursuing European art and culture.

== Later career ==
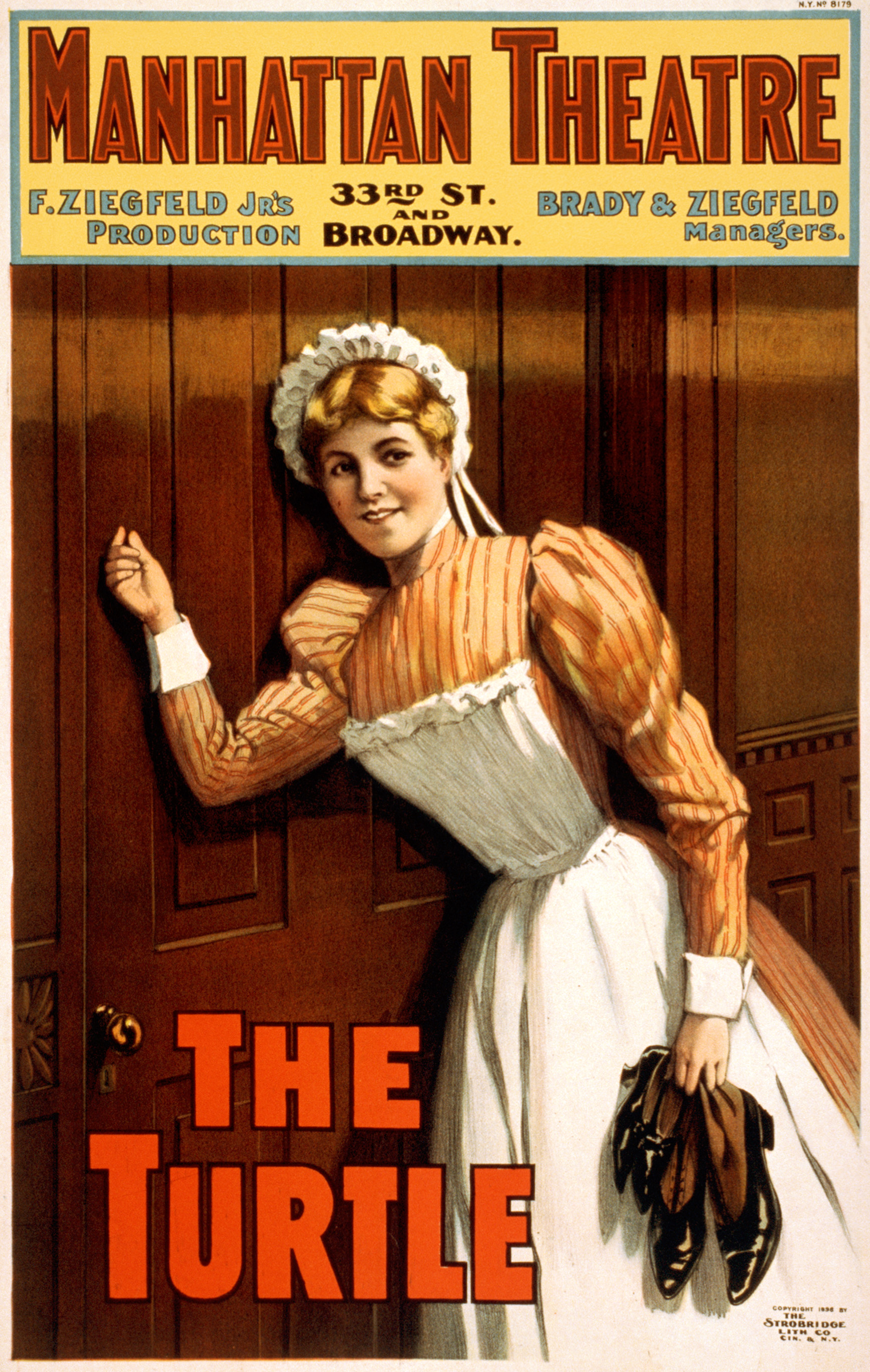
Poster for The Turtle (1898)

Martinot returned to New York to star in the much anticipated comic opera Nadjy, but after a disagreement with the Casino Theatre stage manager, she withdrew from the production before the piece debuted. Her first performance after returning from Europe was played in German at Amberg's German Theatre early in 1889 as Bettina in Das Maskottchen (The Mascot). At the Garden Theatre on September 27 of the following year she played Mrs. Horton in Hamilton Aide's Dr. Bill and at the same venue that October 6, Lois in Jerome K. Jerome's Sunset. Over the following two seasons Martinot starred in a national tour performing the title role in the Charles Frederic Nirdlinger play Pompadour and Dora in Victorien Sardou's Diplomacy. Martinot remained active in theatre, in New York or elsewhere, well into the first decade of the new century in roles such as:

Suzette in The Voyage of Suzette (1893)
Mrs. Darcey in The Passport (1894)
Lady Angela in Patience (1896)
Hattie in A Stranger in New York (1897)
Leonie in The Turtle (1898)
Lady Carnby in The Marriage Game (1901)
Paula in The Second Mrs. Tanqueray (1903)
Mary Erwin in Mary and John (1905)
Mrs. Temple in Mrs. Temple's Telegram (1906)
Lady Dover in Toddles (1908)

== Personal life ==
Martinot married twice, first to Fred Stinson (d. 1895), a theatrical manager, on March 30, 1879, in Boston, and then to Louis F. Nethersole (d. 1936), a theatrical manager, producer and press agent and a brother of actress Olga Nethersole. While it was reported she married Max Figman, a comedian-actor, with whom she fell into financial difficulty, her marriage record to Louis Nethersole on May 30, 1901, in Manhattan, New York, lists her name as Sarah F. Stinson. At the time of her death Martinot was thought to be divorced from Nethersole. Martinot was the author of a number of magazine articles over her career, a student of Wagnerian opera and an accomplished equestrian.

== Decline ==
On January 5, 1916, Martinot jumped unclad from a second story window of an apartment building on Fort Washington Avenue, New York. She did not, from press reports, appear seriously injured when she landed in an adjacent courtyard, though it was apparent she was mentally unstable. Martinot was transported to Washington Heights Hospital and then later in the day transferred to the Psychiatric Ward at Bellevue Hospital. In March 1918 Martinot was committed to the Manhattan State Hospital for the Insane and later that year moved to St. Lawrence State Hospital, Ogdensburg, New York. At some point early in 1918 Martinot escaped her confinement and was eventually found in Washington, D. C., disoriented and unable to recall her name. She died of heart disease five years later while still institutionalized at St. Lawrence Hospital.
