= William Gray (Massachusetts politician) =

American politician

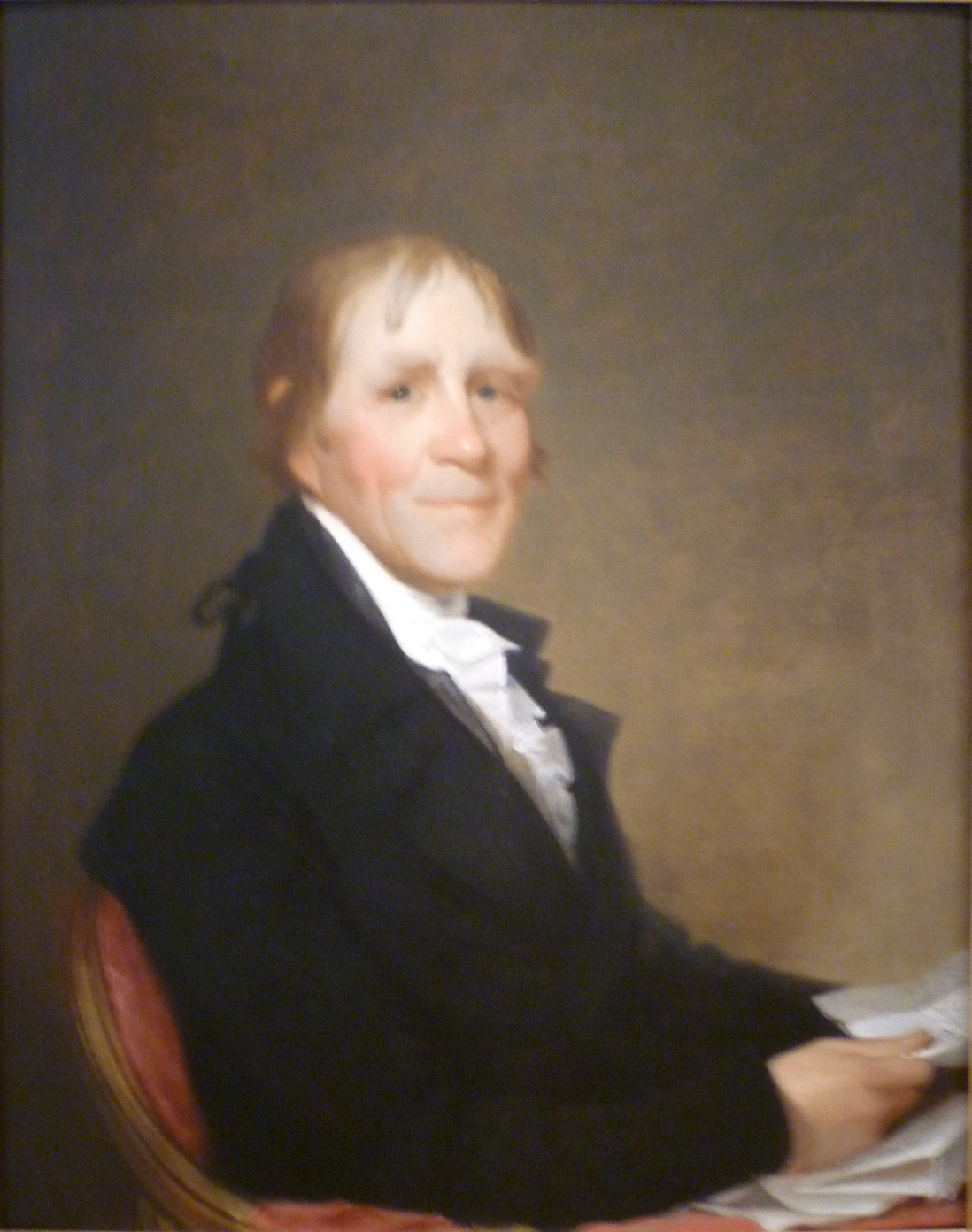
- Portrait by Gilbert Stuart

9th Lieutenant Governor of Massachusetts
- In office 1810–1812
- Governor: Elbridge Gerry
- Preceded by: David Cobb
- Succeeded by: William Phillips, Jr.

Member of the Massachusetts State Senate for Suffolk County
- In office January 12, 1812 – March 1813
- Preceded by: Benjamin Gorham

Member of the Massachusetts House of Representatives for Essex County
- In office 1785–1785

Personal details
- Born: June 27, 1750 (old style; July 8, 1750 new style) Lynn, Massachusetts
- Died: November 4, 1825 (aged 75) Boston, Massachusetts
- Resting place: Mount Auburn Cemetery
- Party: Democratic-Republican
- Spouse: Elizabeth Chipman
- Profession: Merchant

William Gray (June 27, 1750 (old style; July 8, 1750 new style)– November 4, 1825) was a Massachusetts merchant and politician. Born into a lower-class family in Lynn, Massachusetts, he managed to build his own business and rise through the state's political ranks, becoming the richest man in New England, and in the eyes of many the richest man in all of America. Prior to the War of 1812, William Gray had the largest private fleet in the United States with 60 square-rigged vessels.

Gray first served as a state senator, before becoming the ninth lieutenant governor of Massachusetts, serving from 1810 to 1812. He married Elizabeth Chipman (May, 1756 - September 24, 1823) in 1782. Elizabeth was a pioneer in philanthropy, volunteering a significant portion of her time to helping the poorest citizens of Boston.

In 1820, he was elected a member of the American Antiquarian Society

He owned Gray's Wharf in Charlestown. In Boston "he lived on Summer Street, in the mansion previously occupied by Governor Sullivan." For a time, Nathaniel Prime served as his coachman. He was also a part owner of the Dedham Manufacturing Company and was president of the Boston branch of the Bank of the United States from 1816 to 1820.

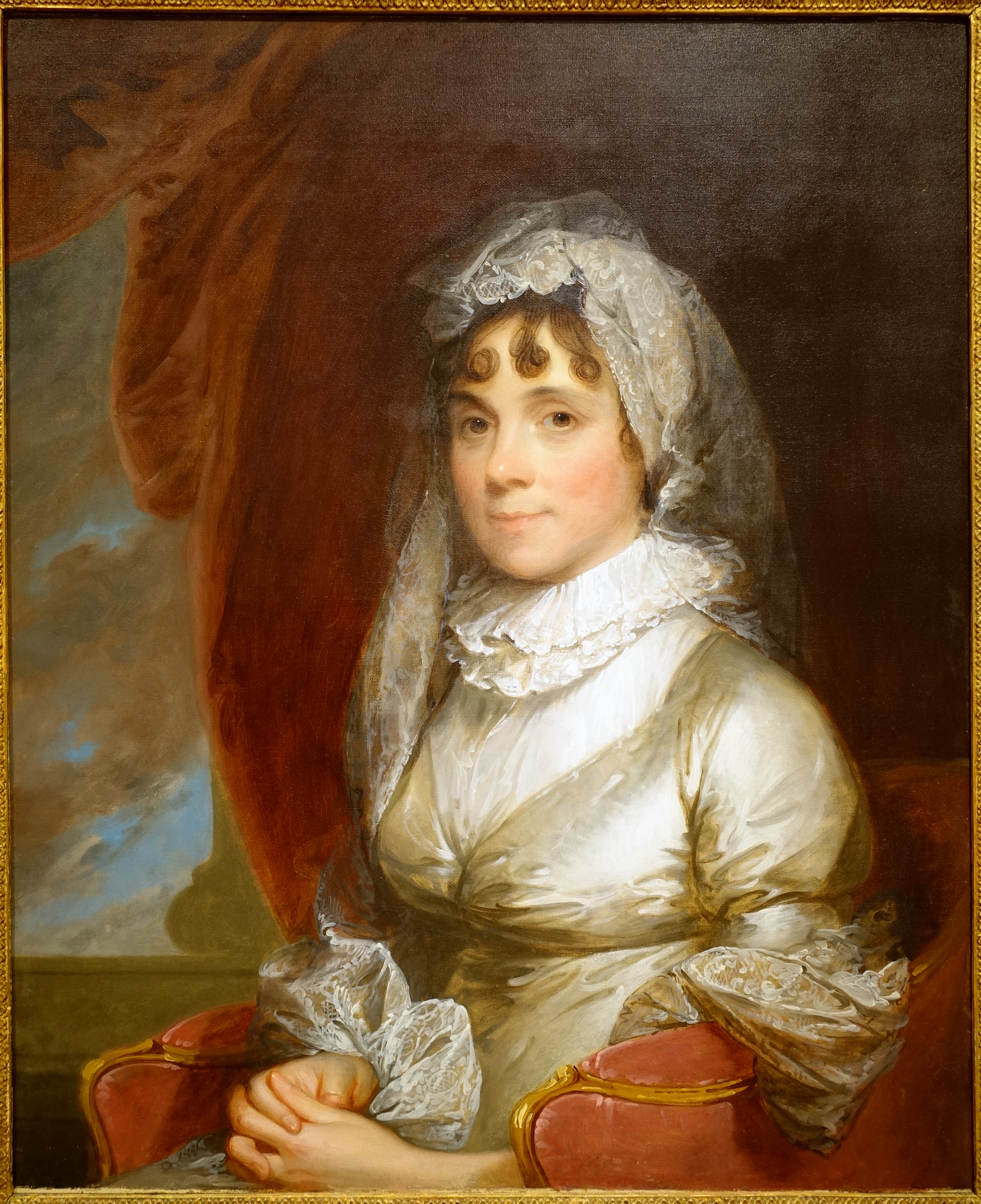
Elizabeth Chipman Gray (Mrs. William Gray) by Gilbert Stuart, c. 1800, oil on canvas - Peabody Essex Museum

Elizabeth and William had five sons and one daughter:

- William Rufus Gray (1783–1831), a merchant.
- Henry Gray, a merchant. (1784–1854)
- Lucia Gray Swett (1788–1844)
- Francis Calley Gray (1790–1856), a politician, writer, orator, art collector.
- John Chipman Gray, (1793–1881) a politician
- Horace (1801–1873), father of Supreme Court of the United States associate justice, Horace Gray, and of Harvard Law School professor, John Chipman Gray

Political offices
Preceded by David Cobb	Lieutenant Governor of Massachusetts; 1810–1812	Succeeded by William Phillips, Jr.
Preceded by Benjamin Gorham	Massachusetts State Senator; January 12, 1812–March 1813	Succeeded by
Preceded by	Member of the Massachusetts House of Representatives; 1785–1785	Succeeded by
