= Charles H. Yale =

American actor

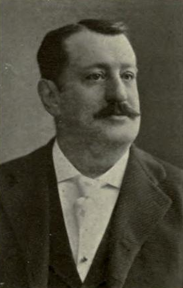
Portrait of Chas. H. Yale

Charles H. Yale (1856 – 1920) was an American theatre producer and performer. Early in his career he worked for the Boylston Museum in Boston, Massachusetts. In 1897 he formed a partnership in New York with David Henderson and W.J. Gilmore to produce "spectacular, operatic and musical plays." Among Yale's theatrical productions are The Sea King, The Devil's Auction and Twelve Temptations. He went bankrupt in 1910. He belonged to the National Theatrical Producing Managers Association. He died in Rochester, New York, in 1920.

== Gallery ==
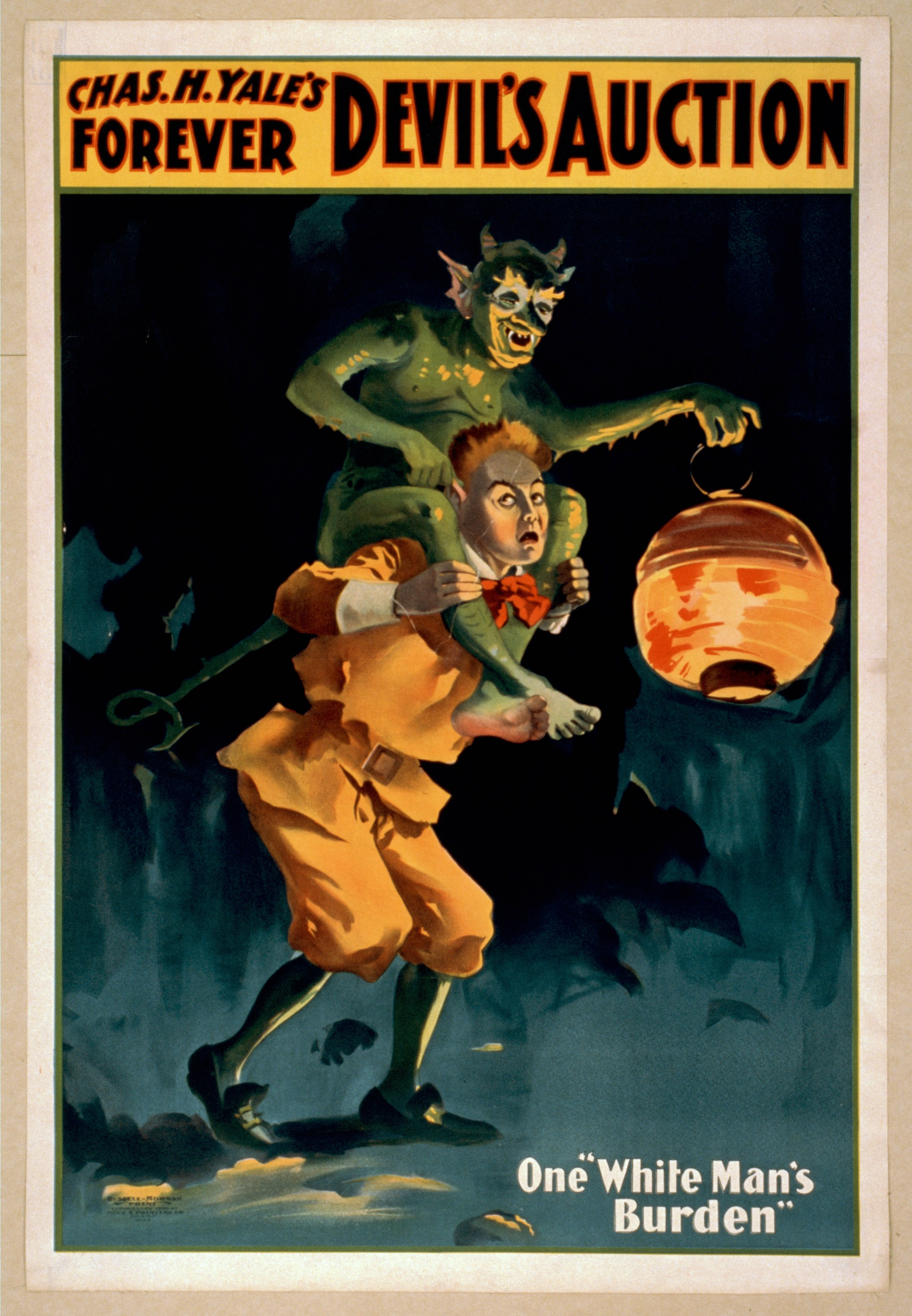

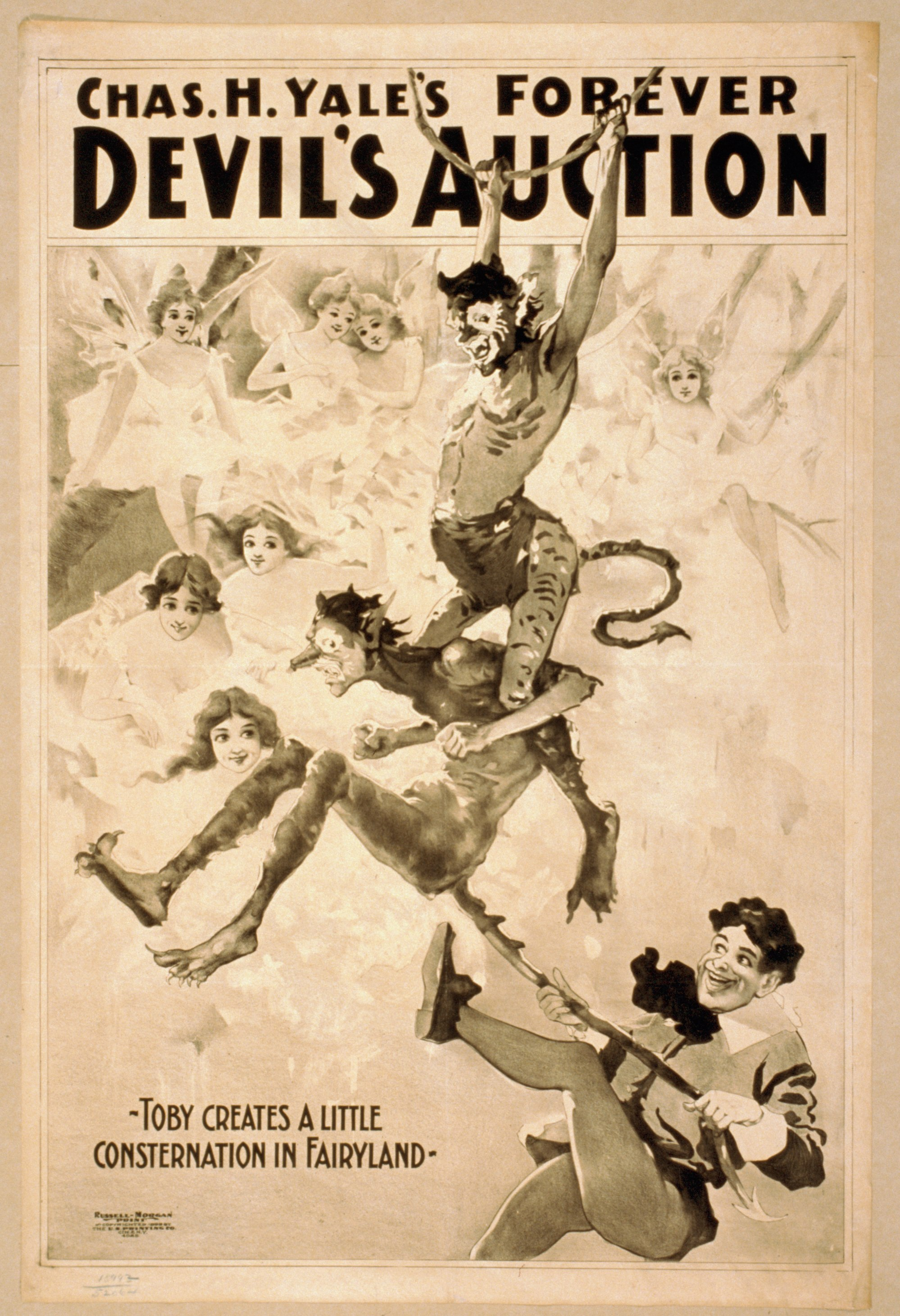

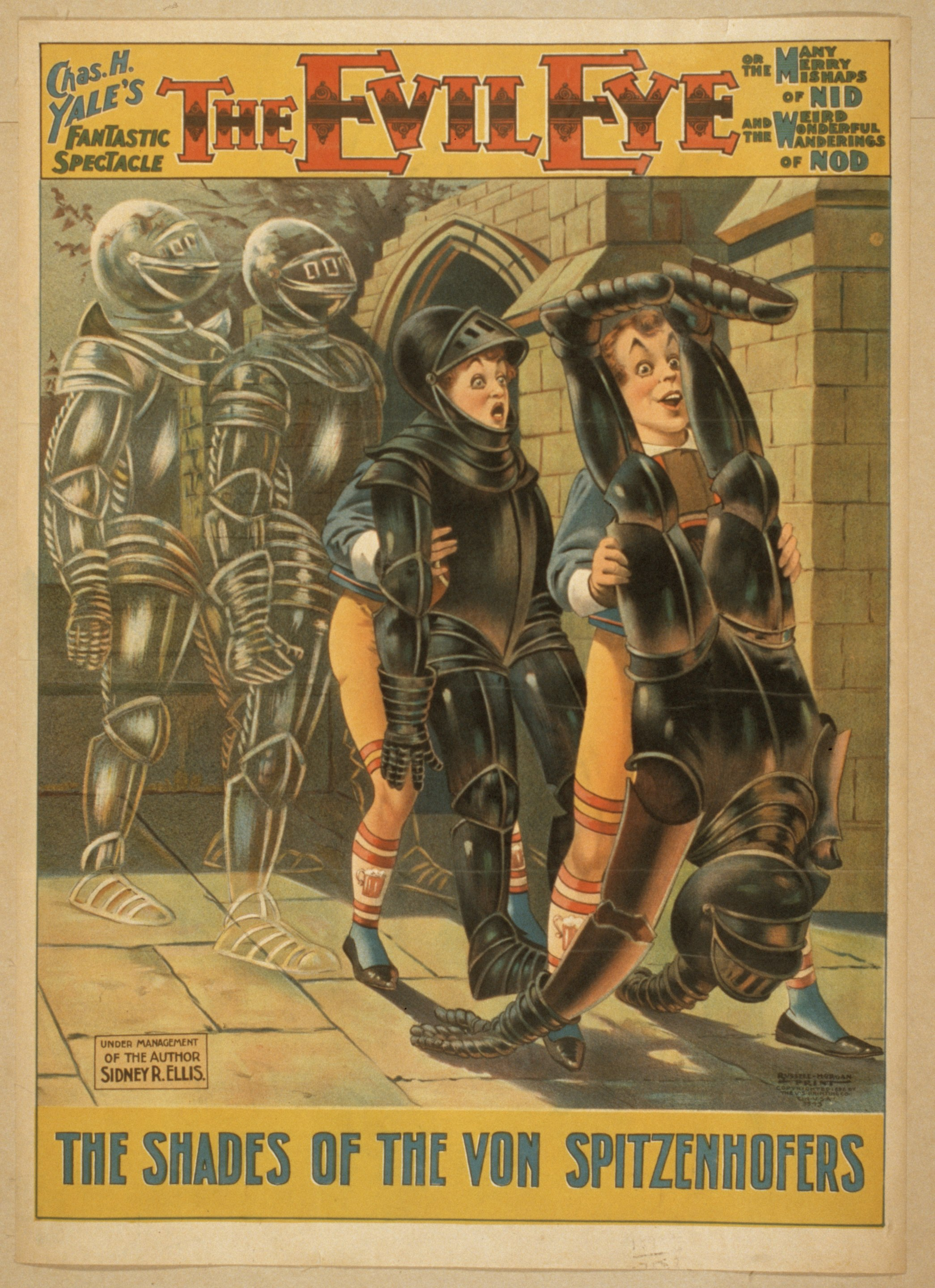

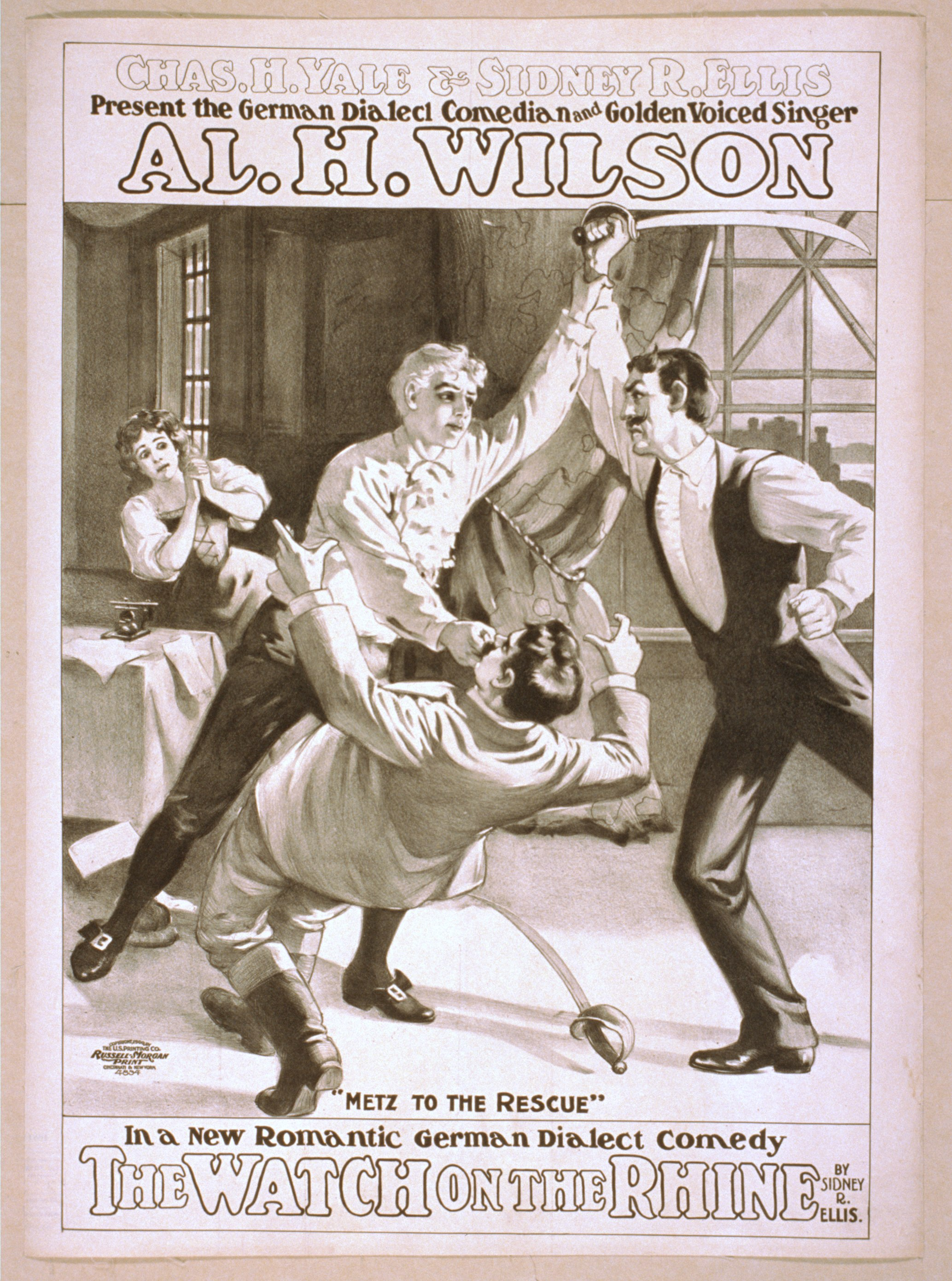

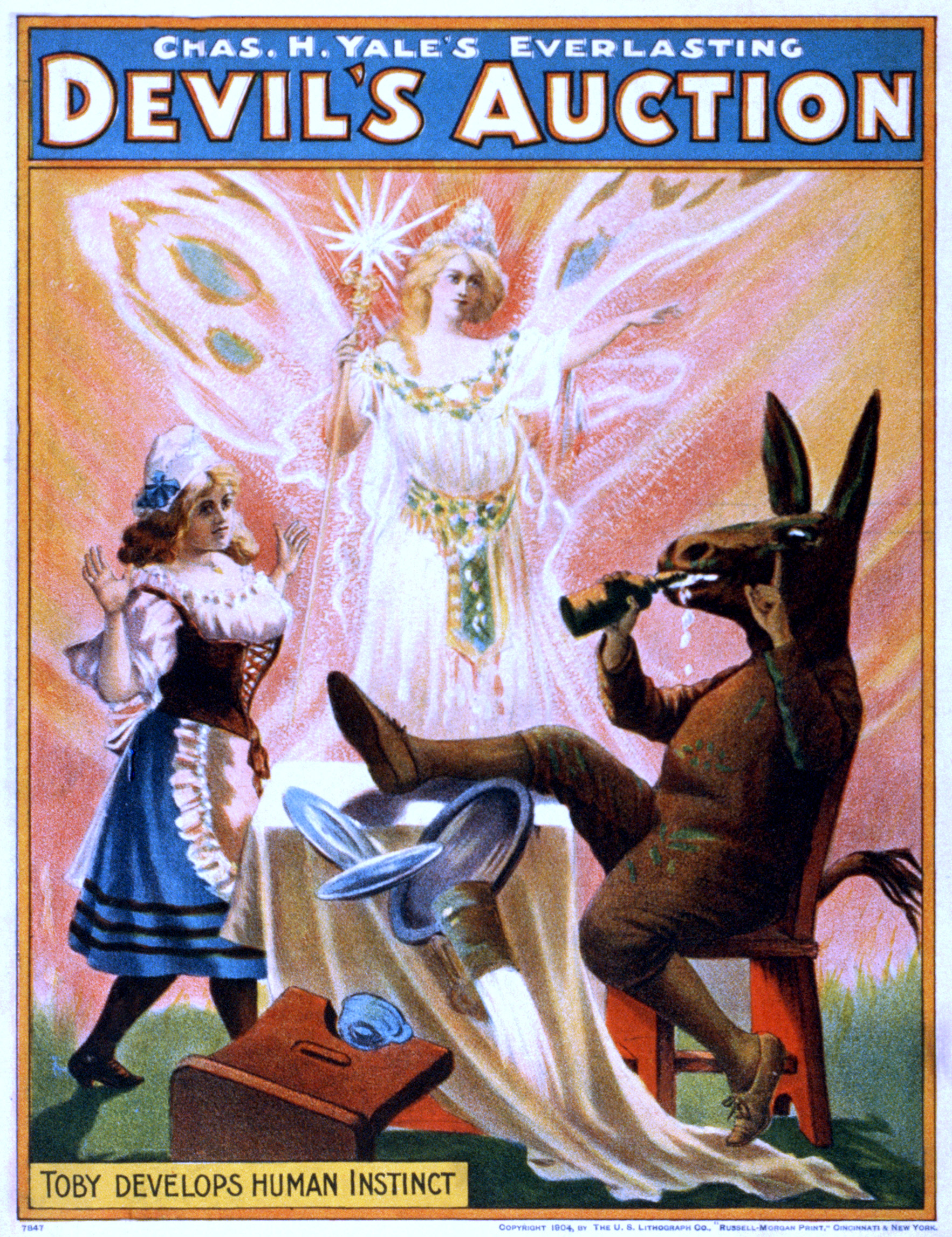

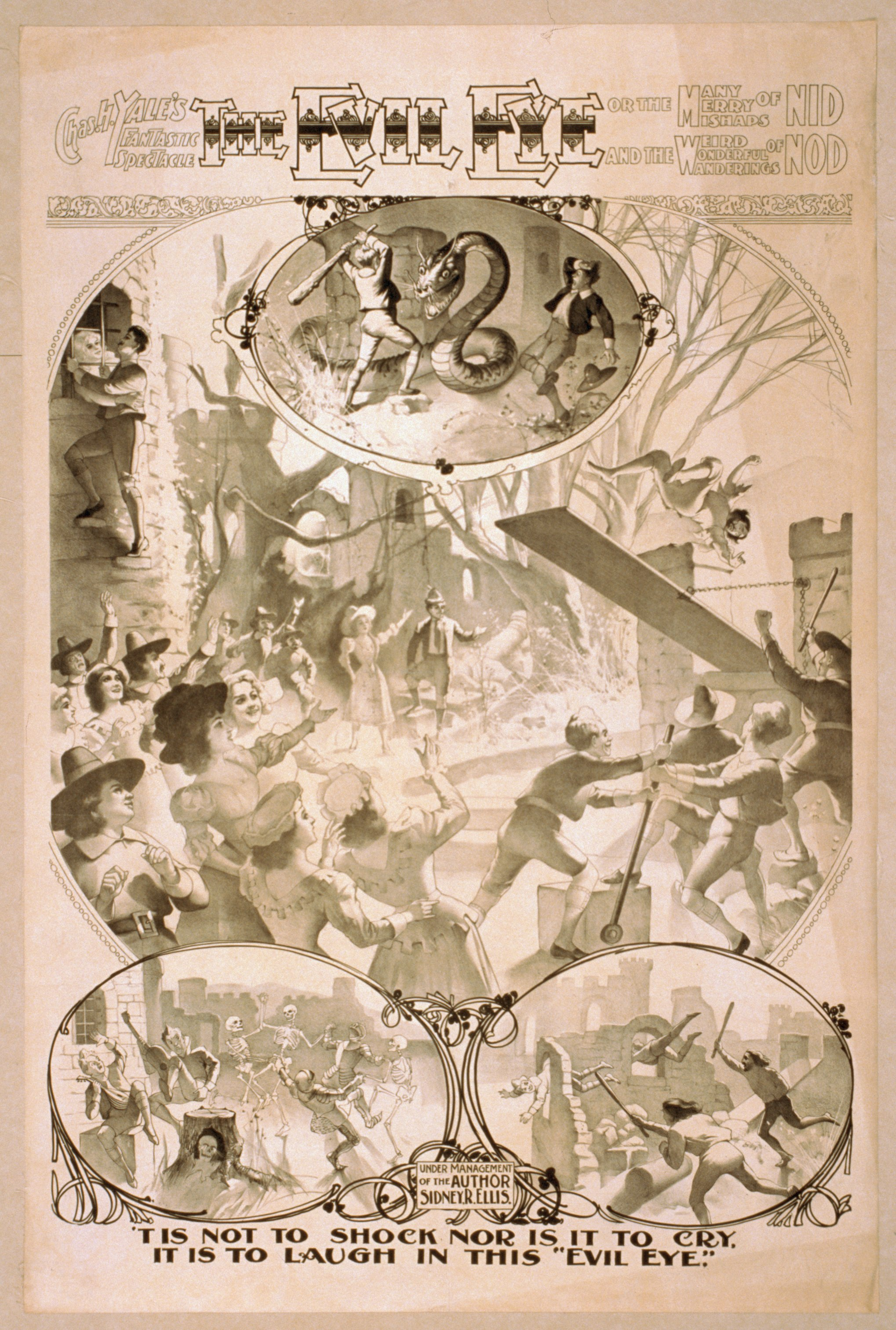

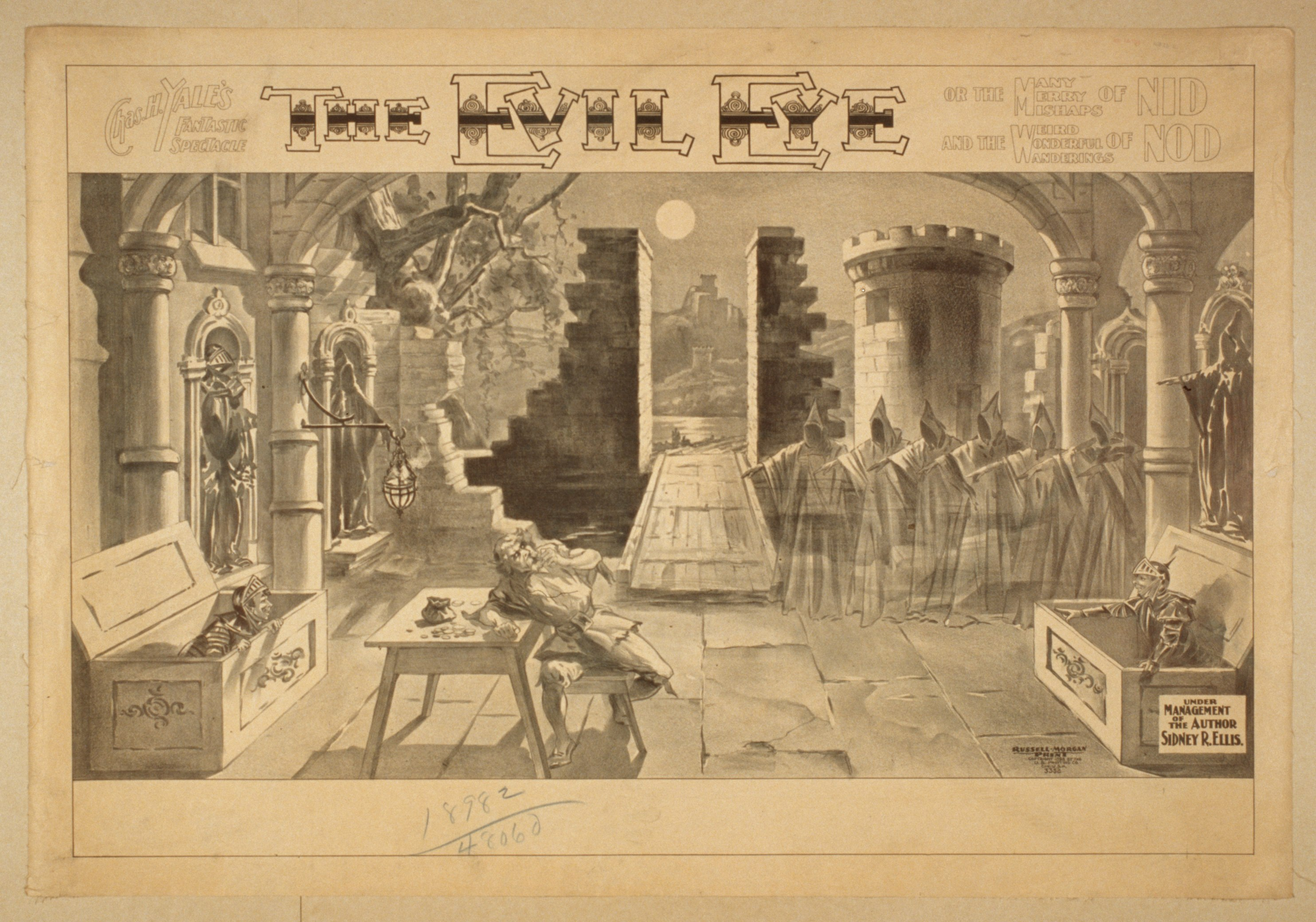

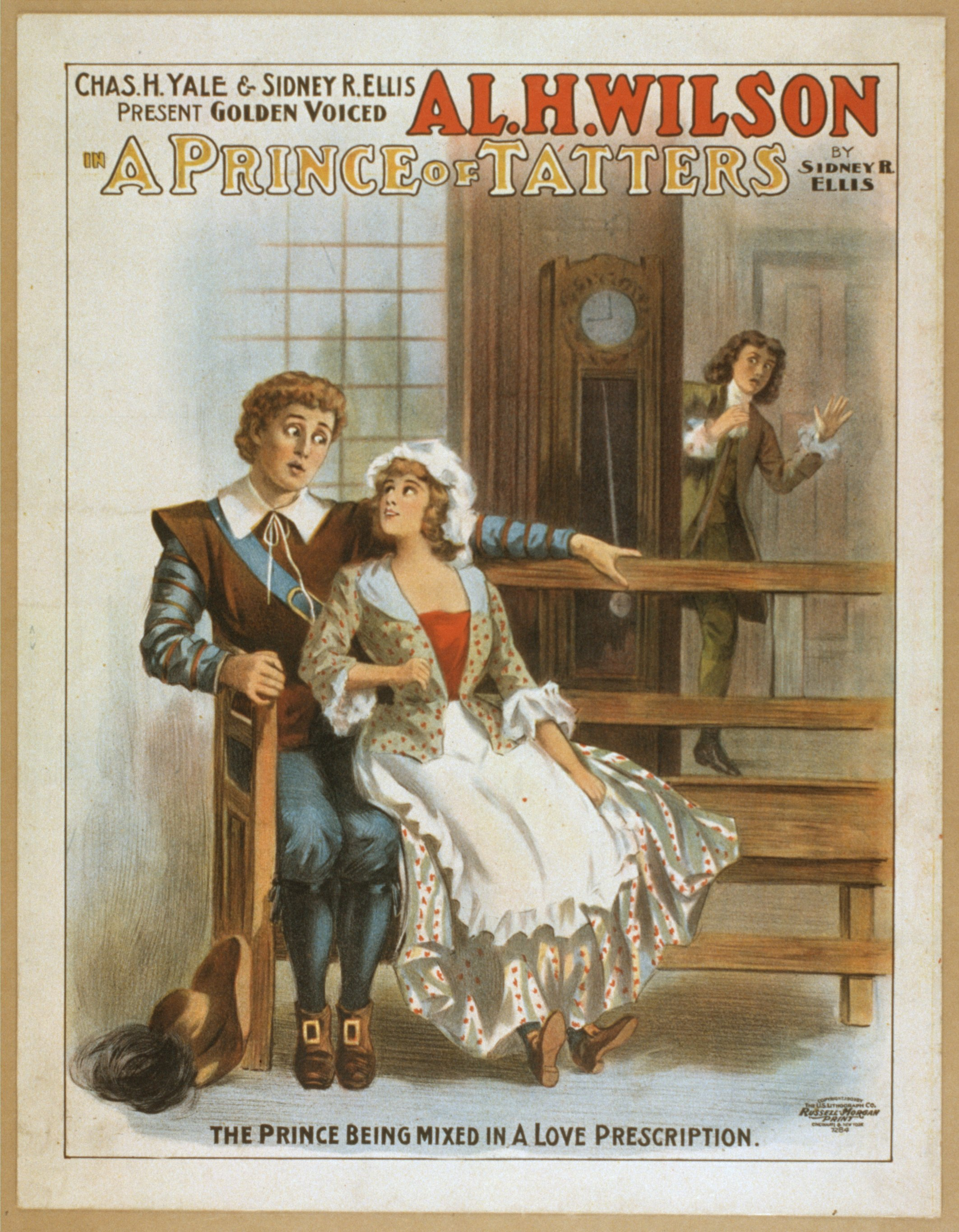
