= Gloucester sea serpent =

Alleged sea monster off Cape Ann, Mass.

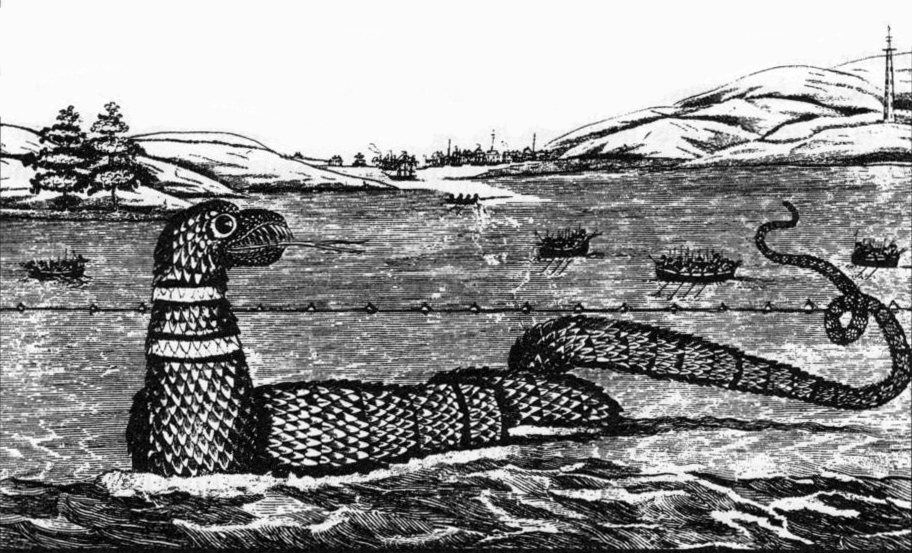
The Gloucester sea serpent of 1817, drawing in 1994 book Monsters of the Sea

The Gloucester sea serpent is a legendary creature reportedly seen around and off the coast of Gloucester, Massachusetts, and the greater Cape Ann area in the United States. The heyday of sightings began in August 1817 and continued into 1818–1819. Described as a massive serpent-like creature with humps along its back, the Gloucester sea serpent has been the subject of numerous alleged sightings and tales of encounters by fishermen and sailors. The earliest purported eyewitness account of such a creature off Cape Ann was recorded in 1638 by writer John Josselyn. Occasional reports have continued into the 21st century.

== History ==
Although the Indigenous People of Cape Ann had told the settlers about a sea serpent, one of the earliest modern recorded sightings of the Gloucester sea serpent was in 1817, when a group of fishermen reportedly saw a 60 ft (18 m) serpent-like creature with a head like a turtle swimming in the waters off the coast of Gloucester. The sightings continued sporadically throughout the 19th century, with many local fishermen claiming to have witnessed the creature while out at sea.

One of the most famous alleged sightings of the Gloucester sea serpent occurred in August 1817, when a group of men aboard the schooner Caravan reported seeing a large creature with a head like a serpent and a hump-backed body swimming alongside their vessel. The crew reportedly fired a cannon in the direction of the unknown animal, but it disappeared beneath the water and was not seen again.

Bernard Heuvelmans outlined sightings of the creature in his cryptozoology book In the Wake of the Sea-Serpents, originally titled Le Grand Serpent-de-Mer.

Several witnesses had reported seeing a stinger or spear protruding from the head of the creature, which has led skeptic Joe Nickell to suggest that the creature was, in actuality, a vagrant pod of narwhals.

== Description ==
Over the years, numerous sightings of the Gloucester sea serpent have been reported, with descriptions of the creature varying widely. Some have described it as a long snake-like creature, while others have claimed to have seen a hump-backed animal with a head like a horse, a seal, or a dinosaur. Because hundreds, and possibly even thousands of people have reported witnessing the creature, combined with the Linnaean Society's report, this alleged sea serpent is one of the most well documented on record. Despite the numerous sightings and tales of encounters, the existence of the Gloucester sea serpent remains a subject of debate and skepticism. Some have speculated that the creature could be a large species of eel, while others have suggested that it may be a hoax or the result of misidentifications of known marine animals.

In 2023, Karl Brandt suggested well-known sea serpent sightings, including those of the Gloucester sea serpent, could be explained by harpooned sperm whales held fast to their hunters’ overturned rowboats. The boats would accumulate debris at the surface which could stretch for hundreds of yards while appearing to be propelled through the water by unknown means.

Linnaean Society illustration

== In popular culture ==
Although the Gloucester sea serpent features in public imagery in the area, according to New England Legends host Jeff Belanger, local businesses have reportedly not extensively capitalized on the legend. During an interview conducted by journalist Arun Rath, Belanger noted that in contrast to the legend of Champ in Lake Champlain, he has "never seen Gloucester trying to cash [in] on it".

Charleston playwright William Crafts lampooned the reports of the serpent in his play The sea serpent; or, Gloucester hoax: A dramatic jeu d'esprit, in three acts, published in 1819.

== See also ==
- Champ – Alleged lake monster in Lake Champlain, United States
- Chessie – Legendary sea monster in the folklore of Chesapeake Bay
- Sea serpent – Type of sea monster described in religion, mythology, and folklore
- Linnaean Society of New England § Sea serpent
- Thomas Handasyd Perkins § Gloucester sea serpent
