= Francis Calley Gray =

American politician

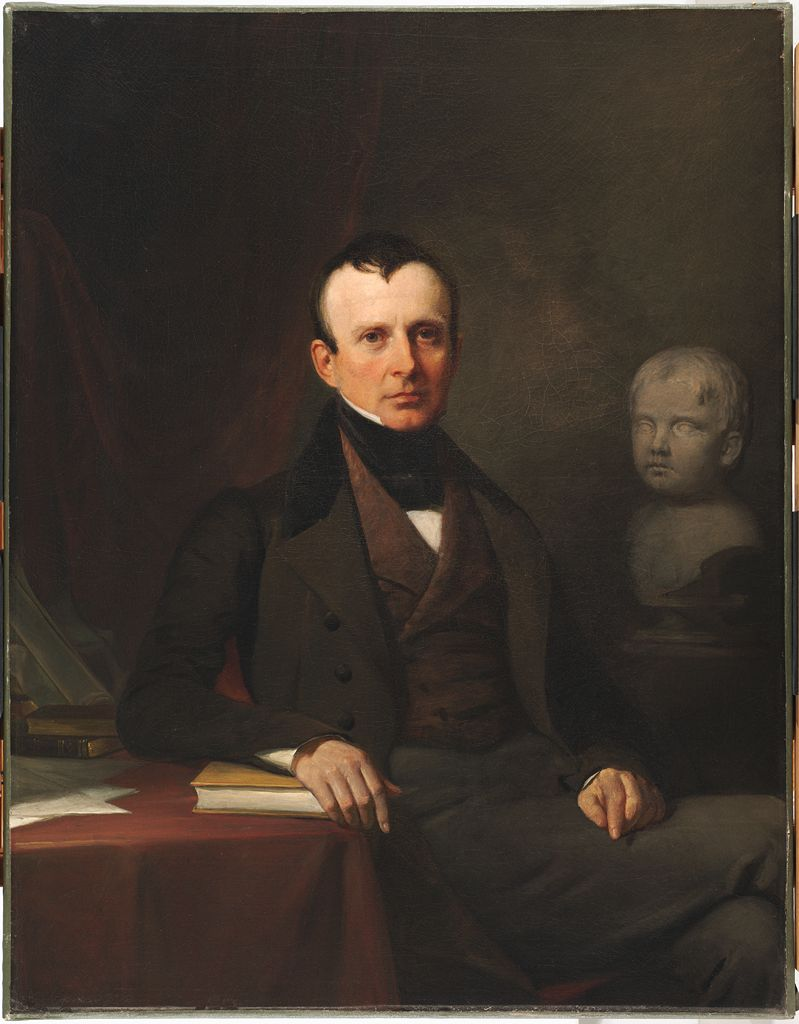
Francis Calley Gray, portrait by Francis Alexander

Francis Calley Gray (September 19, 1790 – December 29, 1856) was a politician from Massachusetts, United States. He was the son of Elizabeth and William Gray, he graduated Harvard University (1809) and went on to be John Quincy Adams's private secretary, a member of the Massachusetts House of Representatives, and president of the Boston Athenæum. Gray was elected a Fellow of the American Academy of Arts and Sciences in 1819, and a member of the American Antiquarian Society in 1820. Gray was a member of Harvard Overseers. When he died, he left many gifts to Harvard, including his collection of 3,000 engravings and $50,000 (equivalent to $1,791,667 today) to be put towards a museum of comparative zoology.

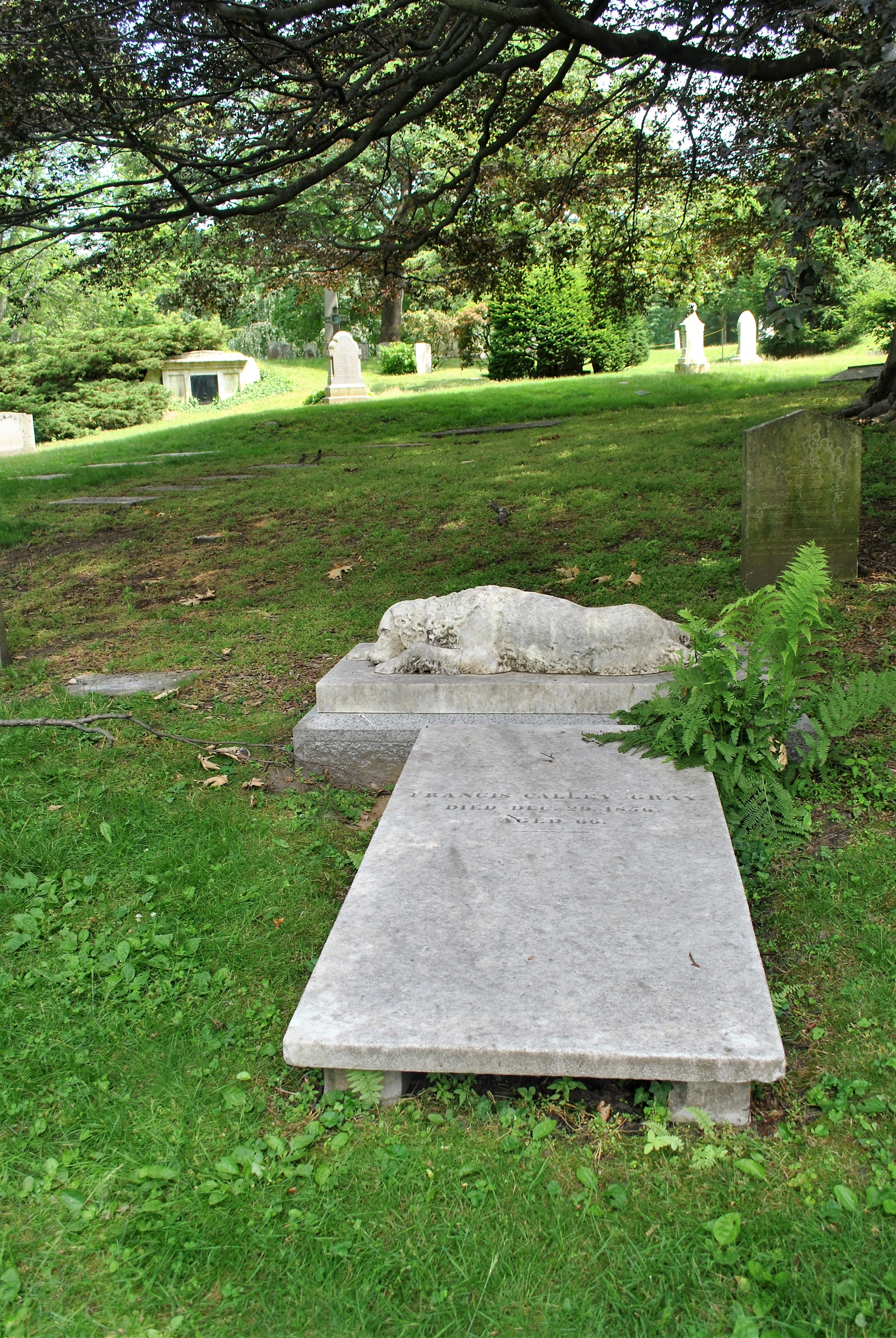
Mount Auburn Cemetery, Francis Calley Gray

He died in 1856 and is buried at Mount Auburn Cemetery, his tomb guarded by a sleeping dog.
