= Boylston Market =

Building in Boston, Massachusetts (1810–87)

Coordinates: 42.3521°N 71.0631°W

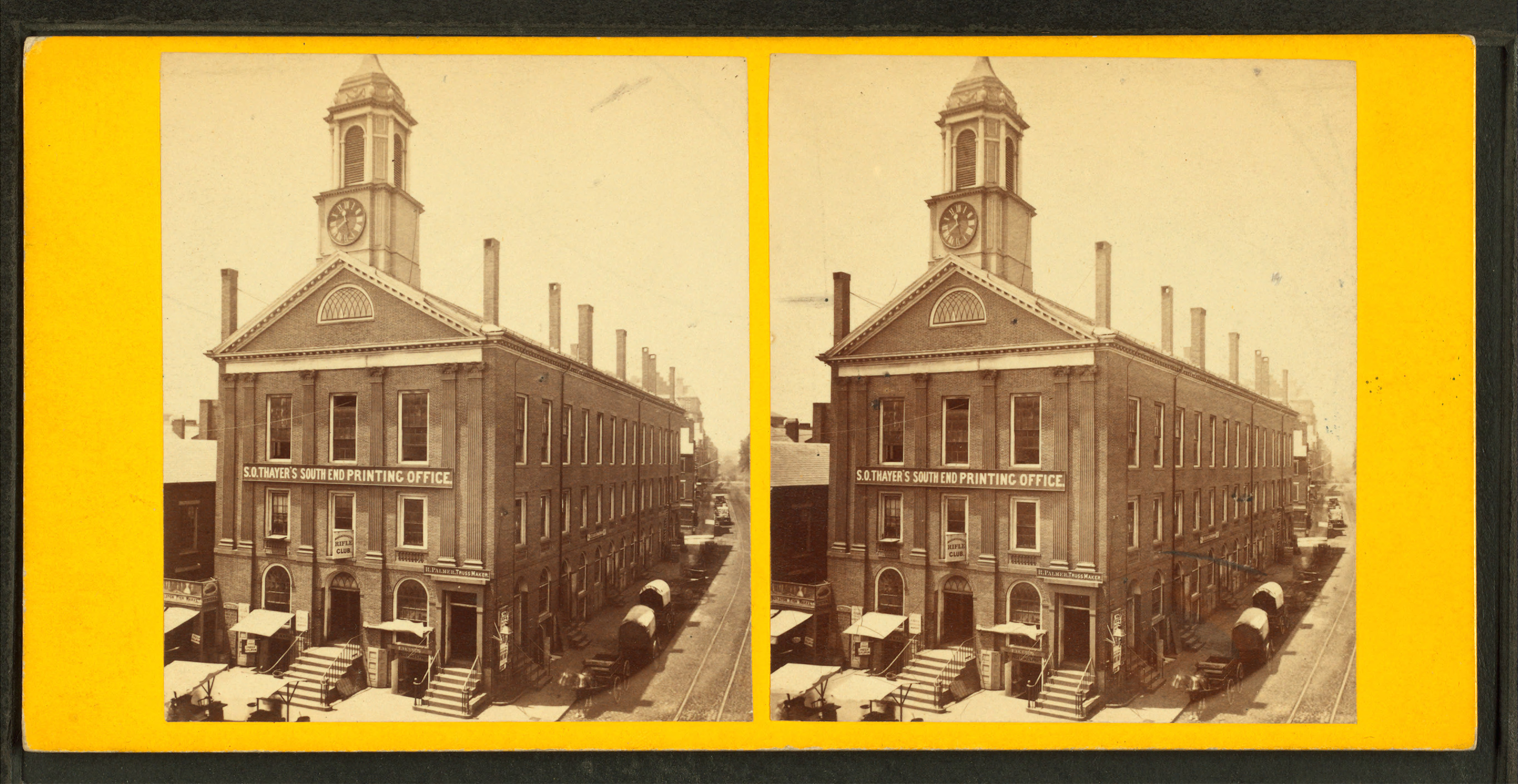
Boylston Market, 19th century; photo by John B. Heywood

Boylston Market (1810–1887), designed by architect Charles Bulfinch, was located in Boston, Massachusetts, on the corner of Boylston and Washington Streets. Boylston Hall occupied the third floor of the building, and functioned as a performance and meeting space.

== History ==
The Boylston Market Association developed the building. John Quincy Adams served as the association's first president. In 1809, the proprietors paid $20,560 for the land formerly belonging to Joseph C. Dyer (and to Samuel Welles before him). The new building "was named to honor the benevolent and philanthropic Ward Nicholas Boylston".

=== Design and development ===
Construction began in April, 1810, and was completed the same year. The 3-story building measured 120 feet long and 50 feet wide. "On the first floor are 12 stalls for the sale of provisions. The 2nd is separated by an avenue running lengthwise, on the sides of which are 4 spacious rooms. The 3rd story consists of a hall 100 feet in length with the entire width of the building. the central height of the ceiling is 24 feet. It contains an orchestra, and 2 convenient withdrawing-rooms adjoining."

"In 1859 an extension of 40 feet was made." "In 1870 the solid brick structure was moved back from the street eleven feet without disturbing the occupants."

=== Tenants ===
Early tenants included the Linnaean Society of New England, and Edward Savage's New York Museum, c. 1812, both "handsomely fitted with natural and artificial curiosities." The Handel and Haydn Society held concerts in the hall for several years. In 1845 some of the members of the Workingmen's Protective Union opened a shop on the 2nd floor. Other vendors in the market included butter & cheese dealers M.C. Strout and F.H. Thomas (c. 1877).

Special events in Boylston Hall included the New-England Anti-Slavery Convention, 1834; July 4 celebrations of the New England Anti-Slavery Society in the 1830s; and Corydon Donnavan's "Grand Serial Panorama of Mexico," c. 1848: "Capt. Donnavan, for several months a prisoner during the recent war in [Mexico], will deliver an explanatory discourse, relating many incidents of the war, Mexican life, manners, &c, as the painting passes before the audience."

=== Demolition ===
Boylston Market was demolished in 1887. In its place, the "Boylston Building" was erected. The belfry from the original Boylston Market structure went to the Bunker Hill Breweries in Charlestown, Massachusetts, and was moved to the Calvary Methodist Church in Arlington, Massachusetts, in 1921.

== In popular culture ==
Poet John Pierpont refers to the Boylston Market in his 1840 poem "The Drunkard's Funeral."

== Images ==
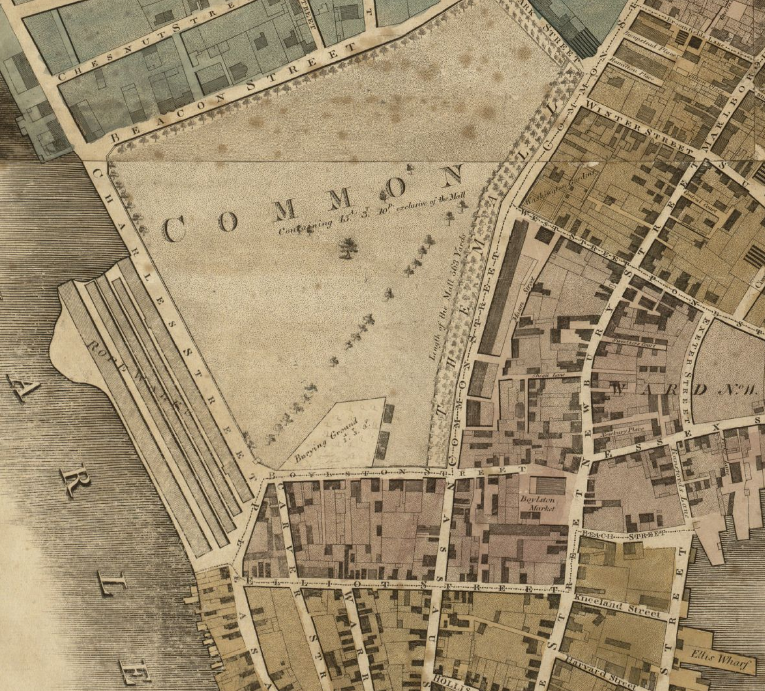
Detail of 1814 map of Boston, showing location of Boylston Market

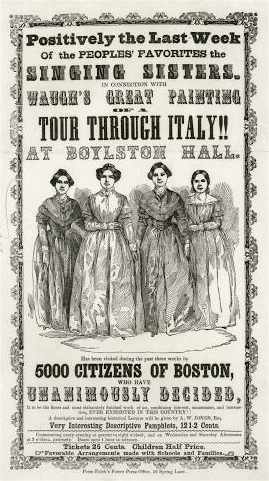
Samuel B. Waugh, and the Singing Sisters, at Boylston Hall, 1855

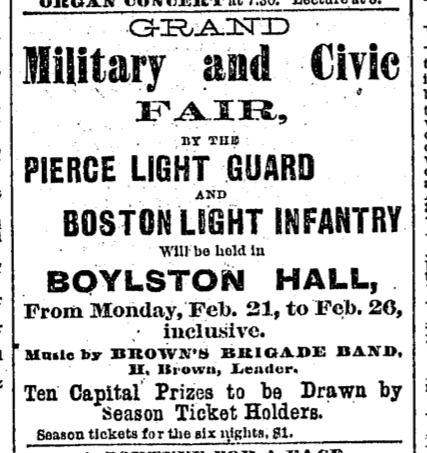
Announcement for "military & civic fair," 1881

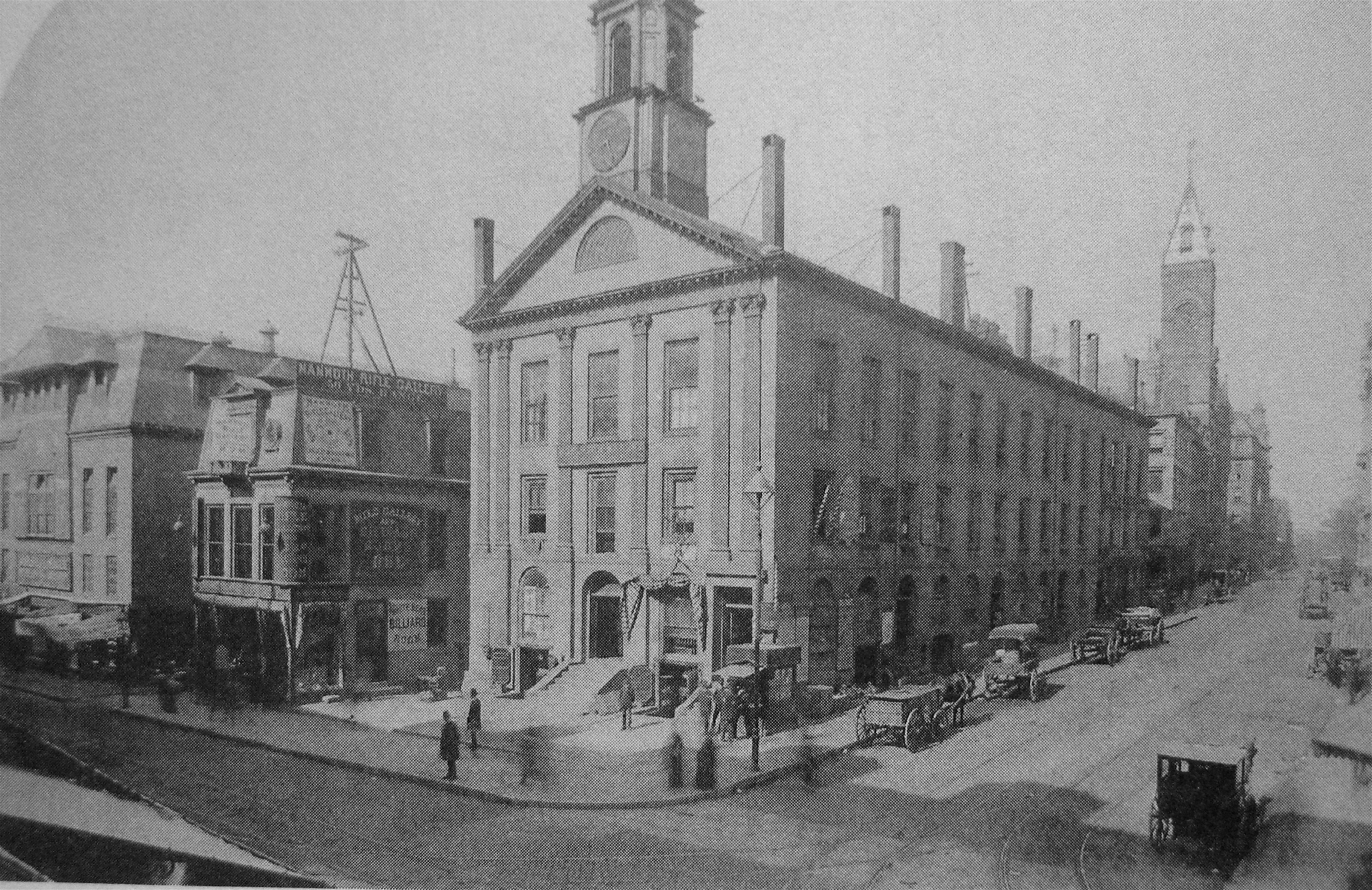
Boylston Market

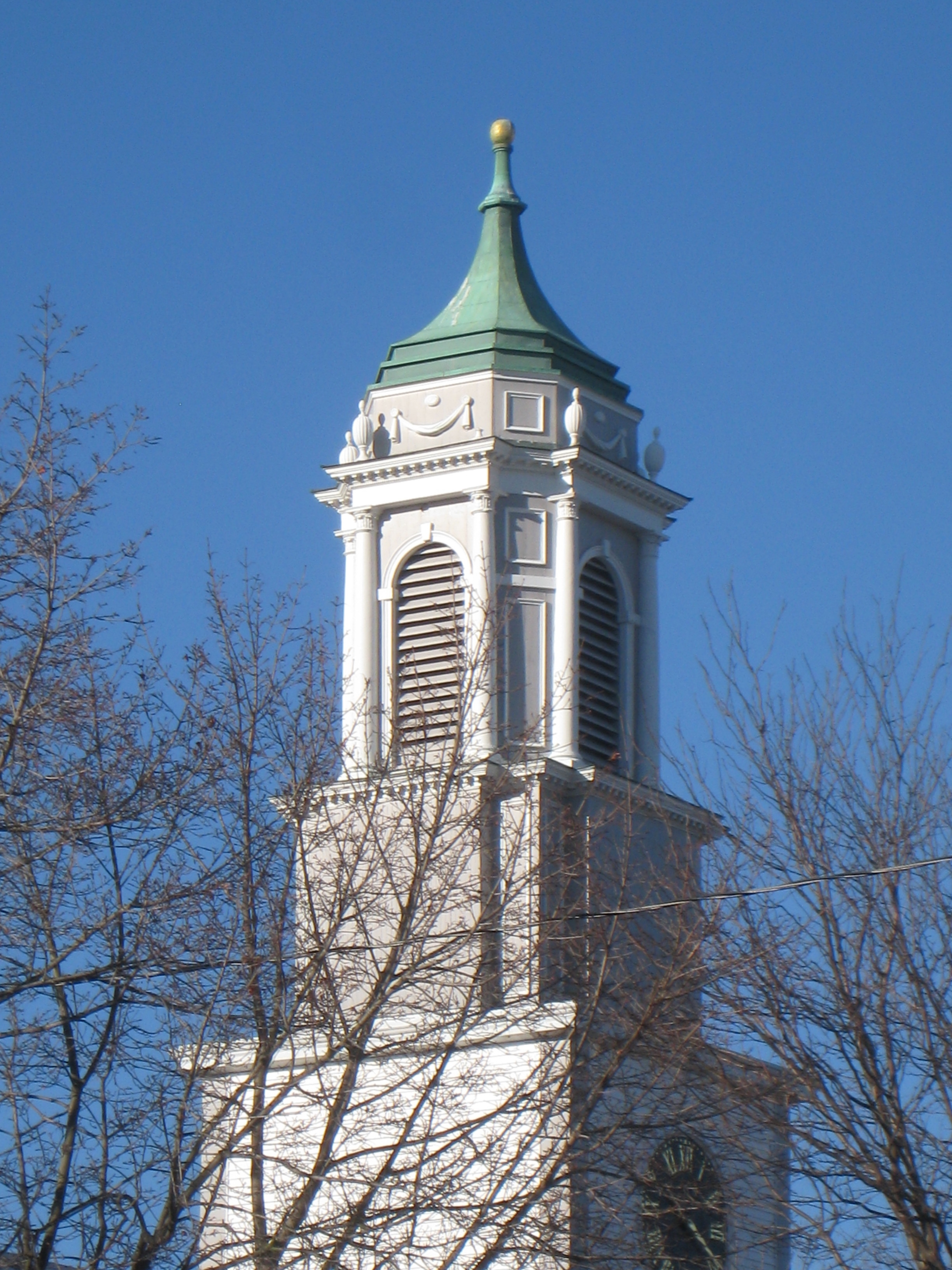
Former belfry of Boylston Market, now part of the Calvary Methodist Church building, Arlington, Massachusetts (photo 2009)
