= Chessie (sea monster) =

Legendary sea monster in the folklore of Chesapeake Bay

Whimsical costume of Chessie the Chesapeake Bay Monster at the 4th annual Maryland Faerie Festival, 2008.

In American folklore, Chessie is a sea monster said to live in the midst of the Chesapeake Bay. Claims of sightings appear in local media and regionally-themed books from 1936 onward. Over time, the figure developed into an environmental icon. Chessie is associated with the ecological health of the Chesapeake Bay, continuing to play a role in modern popular culture.

== Claims of sightings ==
The earliest purported sighting of a Chessie-like creature was allegedly from a military helicopter flying over Bush River in 1936. "Something reptilian and unknown in the water" was observed by the helicopter's crew. However, a Chessie sighting from a helicopter in 1936 seems unlikely, if not impossible, as the earliest Sikorsky helicopter flight was near Stratford, Connecticut in 1939.

According to Matt Lake in Weird Maryland, two perch fishermen, Francis Klarrman and Edward J. Ward, spotted something in the water near Baltimore in 1943:

This thing was about 75 yards [70 m] away, at right angles from our boat. At first, it looked like something floating on the water. It was black and the part of it that was out of the water seemed about 12 feet [3.5 m] long. It has ahead about as big as a football and shaped somewhat like a horse’s head. It turned its head around several times — almost all the way around.

In 1978, witnesses claimed to have seen Chessie near Southern Maryland's Calvert Cliffs State Park and in the Potomac River in Westmoreland County, Virginia.

A sketch of an unknown sea creature, drawn by boater Trudy Guthrie, was published by the Evening Sun in September 1980. It was later identified as a manatee from Florida. Manatees are occasionally sighted in the area. Unlike the reports of a serpentine creature, manatees create a "smooth 'footprint'... as they move" rather than undulating from side to side.

In 1982, Robert and Karen Frew supposedly videotaped Chessie near Kent Island. Their video shows a brownish object moving side to side like an aquatic snake.

Another claim of a sighting of the beast occurred in 1997, off the shore of Fort Smallwood Park, very close to shore.

The most recent reported sighting occurred on April 5, 2014, at 1:40 am. While parked on the side of Arundel Beach Road directly next to the Magothy River "when the tide was really high", a Maryland resident and his friend reportedly saw Chessie less than 5 feet (1.5 m) away from his car. He described it as a snake-like creature 25–30 feet (7.5–9 m) in length, without fins, topped with a slender football-shaped head, and black in color, although he wasn't able to discern whether it had scales or leathery skin. The creature did not rise out of the water, but the head and tail end "just breached the surface" of the water as it moved "with a serpentine motion". The witness first questioned himself if it was two separate animals traveling behind one another, but soon realized that it was one creature because of the pattern it created on the water's surface. There are no known snakes in Maryland that get anywhere close to 25 feet long. Although no photo was obtained because the witness was "so busy trying to figure out what the hell I was looking at" that he did not think to take a picture with his cell phone, the witness was so moved he called the Maryland Department of Natural Resources soon after the sighting.

== Environmental icon ==
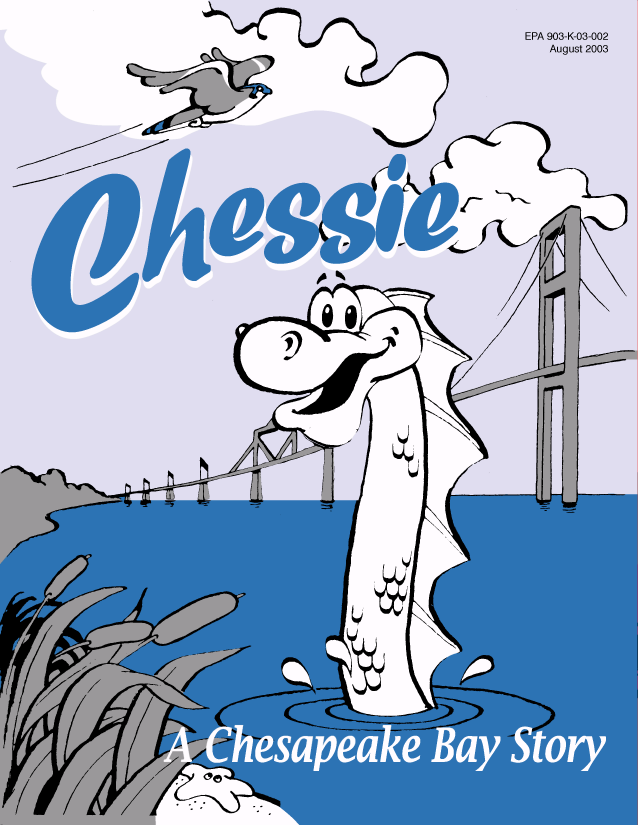
Coloring book published by the U.S. Fish and Wildlife Service in 1986

Chessie, as an environmental icon for the Chesapeake Bay, was used by the U.S. Fish and Wildlife Service for its educational coloring book in 1986, Chessie: A Chesapeake Bay Story. The coloring book focuses on the Chesapeake Bay and protecting its resources. A second coloring book, Chessie Returns was published in 1991. This follow-up book is a prequel that assumes that the monster is female.

In the 1980s, Chessie became a symbol for environmental advocacy in Maryland. Illustrations of the monster in newspapers and government publications, accompanying articles about environmental issues, gave the monster a friendly appearance. Eric Cheezum wrote, in Discovering Chessie: Waterfront, Regional Identity, and the Chesapeake Bay, "The friendliness of the monster, too, could not help but convey the sense that the Bay was a harmless victim of pollution."

== Popular culture ==
A manatee rescued from the Chesapeake's cold water in October 1994 was nicknamed “Chessie” before it was returned to Florida. In 1995, Chessie the manatee swam back to the Chesapeake Bay, then swam up to Rhode Island, being tracked by a satellite tag on its fluke. Manatees are unusual so far from Florida but this one has revisited the Chesapeake several times since then. Chessie was photographed in the Patapsco River in 2010 (unconfirmed) and again near the shore of Calvert County on July 12, 2011 (confirmed by U.S. Geological Survey biologists).

A statue of the Chesapeake monster advertised the entrance to the now closed Ripley's Believe It or Not! museum at Baltimore's Inner Harbor pavilions. According to a company spokesperson, Chessie was chosen for the facade because it is "very much a myth of the area".

The Cambridge, Maryland-based RAR Brewing features Chessie on many of the beer cans produced by the brewery.

The minor league baseball team Chesapeake Baysox has a green monster mascot named Louie, whose design is based on the Chesapeake Bay Monster.

== Bibliography ==
- Okonowicz, Ed (2012). Monsters of Maryland. Mechanicsburg, PA: Stackpole Books. ISBN 978-0-8117-1034-3.
