= Admiral Dot =

American circus performer

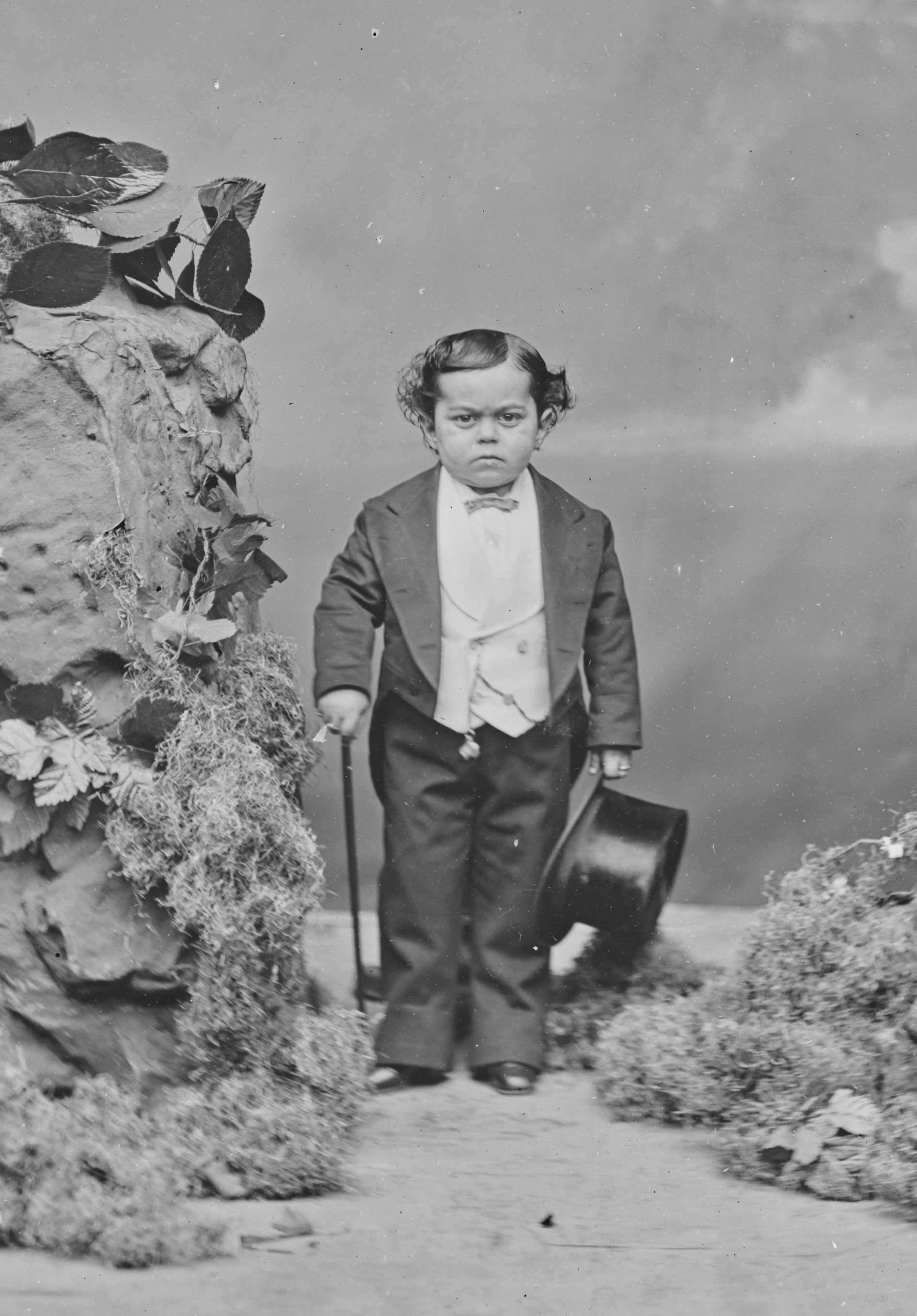
- Admiral Dot c. 1860-1870
- Born: Leopold S. Kahn; 1859 or 1863; San Francisco, California, U.S.
- Died: October 28, 1918; White Plains, New York, US
- Spouse: Lottie Naomi Swartwood

Admiral Dot (1859 or 1863 – October 28, 1918), born Leopold S. Kahn and briefly displayed as the Eldorado Elf, was a dwarf performer for P. T. Barnum.

== Early life ==
Leopold S. Kahn was born in San Francisco, California, in either 1859 or 1863. He was the son of Gabriel Kahn and Caroline Kahn. Caroline gave birth to ten children, although only three survived infancy.

Kahn was raised in a family that included several children with dwarfism. Two of his younger brothers, who were also performers with dwarfism, later became known professionally as Major Atom and General Pin; both were born in 1881. The family's circumstances drew public attention in 1883 when, after General Pin turned two years old, Caroline was declared insane and jailed for attempting to drown him.

== Career ==
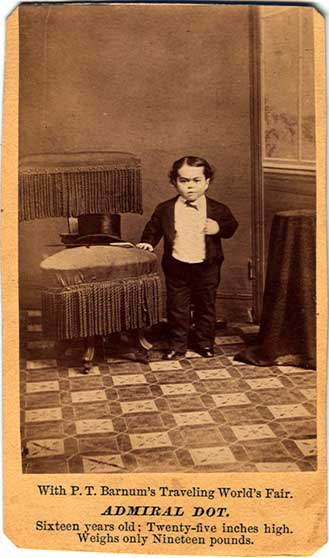

As a young boy, Leopold S. Kahn was discovered by showman P. T. Barnum during Barnum's visit to San Francisco in 1869. Barnum later wrote that Kahn was smaller than General Tom Thumb had been when he was first discovered and described him as "handsome, well-formed and captivating." Barnum gave Kahn the stage name Admiral Dot, dressed him in a naval officer's uniform, and arranged a private preview for newspaper editors at San Francisco's Cosmopolitan Hotel before his public debut.

Kahn made his debut at Woodward's Gardens in San Francisco, where he attracted large crowds during a three-week engagement before travelling east with Barnum's exhibition.

Beginning in 1877, Kahn performed with the American Lilliputian Company. During the 1890s, he toured with the circus of Adam Forepaugh, one of Barnum's principal competitors.

After approximately 25 years in the circus and sideshow business, Kahn retired from performing and settled in White Plains, New York, where he and his wife, Lottie Naomi Swartwood, operated the Admiral Dot Hotel.

== Marriage and family ==
Kahn married dwarf Lottie Naomi Swartwood on August 14, 1892. They had two children: a daughter, Hazel Kahn Golden (1892-1918) and a son, Gabriel Kahn (1896-1982).

== Death ==
Kahn died of the 1918 influenza pandemic at his home in White Plains, New York on October 28, 1918, aged 59 years.
