= List of former theatres in Boston =

The following is a partial list of former theatres in Boston, Massachusetts, United States. It includes multi-purpose public spaces that functioned at least in part as venues for theatrical performances, including vaudeville. Most venues also served at one time or another as concert halls, lecture halls, meeting spaces, etc. Some operated as dime museums, and some as motion picture houses. Some of the buildings that formerly housed theatres have survived to the present day. However, most of the buildings no longer exist.

== Former theatres in Boston ==
Name	Year established	Year closed	Location	Notes	Image
Adelphi Theatre	19th century		Washington Street		
Alhambra	1878				
Allston Hall	19th century		Tremont Street		
Allston Theatre	20th century		Brighton Avenue		
Apollo Theatre	20th century		Washington Street		
The Arena	19th century		Chandler Street		
Arlington Theatre	20th century		Tremont Street		
Austin and Stone's Dime Museum	1883		Tremont Row		
Austin's Nickelodeon	1888	1891 circa	Court Street		
Barnum's Aquarial Gardens	1862	1863	Washington Street		
Beach Street Theatre	19th century				
Beacon Theatre	20th century		Tremont Street		
Beethoven Hall	1874	1878	Washington Street		
Bijou	1882	1943	Washington Street		
Board Alley Theatre	1792	1793	Hawley Street		
Boston Aquarial and Zoological Gardens	1860	1862	Central Court		
Boston Arena	20th century		Street Botolph Street		
Boston Hippodrome	20th century		Tremont Street		
Boston Museum	1841	1903	Tremont Street		
Boston Olympic Theatre	1845		Court Street		
Boston Opera House	1909		Huntington Avenue		
Boston Theatre	1854	1925	Washington Street		
Bowdoin Square Theatre	19th century		Bowdoin Square		
Bowdoin Theatre	1858 circa				
Boylston Hall	1810	1887	Boylston and Washington Streets		
Boylston Museum	1875	1885	667 Washington St at the corner of Boylston and Washington streets.	Founded by George E. Lothrop in 1875. Opened May 1875 as the Boyston Museum, both a variety theatre and dime museum. Later known as the Star Novelty Theatre at the New Boylston Museum. Lothrop acquired the 661, 663, and 665 Washington St properties, and the theatre and museum were substantially expanded into the new World's Museum (1885-1892); also a theatre and dime museum.	
Buckley's Minstrel Hall	1863		Corner of Summer and Chauncey Streets	AKA Buckley's New Minstrel Hall and Aquarial Gardens. AKA Buckley's Serenaders	
Casino Theatre	19th century		Hanover Street		
Casino Theatre	1909				
Castle Square Theatre	1894	1932	Tremont Street		
Chickering Hall	1883	1890s	Tremont Street		
Chickering Hall	1901	1912	Huntington Avenue		
Cobb Theatre	20th century		Washington Street		
Columbia Theatre	1891	1957 circa	Washington Street		
Columbian Museum	1795	1825	Tremont Street		
Concert Hall	1752	1869	Hanover Street; 42.360414°N 71.060342°W		
Continental Theatre	1860s		Washington Street		
Copley Theater	20th century		Dartmouth Street		
Cort Theatre	1914	1915	Park Square		
Donnelly Theatre	March 12, 1922	1968	205 Mass. Ave.	formerly Back Bay Theatre, Jimi Hendrix may have played here with Little Richard's band	
Dudley Street Opera House	19th century		Dudley Street		
Dudley Theatre	20th century		Washington Street		
Eagle Theatre	1840s		Haverhill and Traverse Streets		
Eagle Theatre	20th century		Washington Street		
Egleston Theatre	20th century		Washington Street		
Everett Square Theatre	20th century		Fairmount Avenue		
Exeter Street Theatre	1914	1984	Exeter Street		
Faneuil Hall	18th century				
Federal Street Theatre	1794	1852	Federal Street; 42.355547°N 71.056522°W		
Fenway Theatre	20th century		Massachusetts Avenue		
Forest Garden	1879 circa		Roxbury		
Franklin Park Theatre	20th century		Blue Hill Avenue		
Gaiety Theatre	1878	1882	Washington Street	Became the Bijou Theatre	
Gaiety Theatre	1908	1949	Washington Street		
Gem Theatre	20th century		Meridian Street		
Germania Theatre	1876				
Globe Theatre	1871	1894	Washington Street		
Globe Theatre	1903		Washington Street		
Gordon's Old South	20th century		Washington Street, near Milk Street		
Gordon's Olympia Theatre	20th century		Washington Street		
Grand Dime Museum	19th century		Dover Street		
Grand Museum	19th century		Dover Street and Washington Street		
Grand Opera House	1888	1930s	Washington Street		
Grand Theatre	1896				
Gray's Opera House	1878				
Halleck's Alhambra	1880		City Point		
Harmony Hall	19th century		724 Washington Street		
Harrington's Museum	1840	1842	Court Street		
Haymarket Theatre	1796	1803	Tremont Street		
Hollis Street Theatre	1885	1935	Hollis Street		
Horticultural Hall	1845	1860	School Street		
Howard Athenaeum	1845	1953	Howard Street; 42.359167°N 71.060278°W		
Huntington Avenue Theatre	20th century		Huntington Avenue		
Ideal Theatre	20th century		Dudley Street		
Jane English's New Tremont Theatre	19th century		Tremont Street		
Keith and Bacheller's New York Dime Museum	1883				
Keith's Theatre	1894		Washington Street		
Keith-Albee Boston Theatre	1920s		Washington Street		
Lancaster Theatre	20th century		Lancaster Street		
Lion Theatre	1836	1839	Washington Street	Became the Melodeon	
Lothrop's Grand Museum	19th century		Dover Street		
Lyceum Theatre	1892		Washington Street		
Magnet Theatre	20th century		Washington Street		
Melodeon	1839	1878	Washington Street	Became the Gaiety Theatre	
Metropolitan Theatre	1925		Tremont Street	See Wang Theatre	
National Theatre	1836	1863	Portland Street, West End		
National Theatre	1911	1978	Tremont Street, South End		
New Dime Museum	1882				
New England Museum	1818	1840 circa	Court Street		
Nickelodeon	20th century		Hanover Street		
Nickelodeon Musee and Parlor Theatre	1894		Hanover Street		
Novelty Theatre	19th century		Dover Street		
Oakland Garden	1879 circa		Roxbury		
Ocean Garden	1880				
Olympic Saloon	1841				
Ordway Hall	1852		Washington Street		
P. T. Barnum's Museum and Aquarial Gardens	19th century		Washington Street		
Palace Theatre	19th century		Court Street		
Palais Royal	1878				
Park Garden	1879				
Park Square Theatre	1915	1921	Park Square		
Park Theatre	1879		Washington Street		
Plymouth Theatre	1911	1957	Stuart Street		
Pompeiian Amphitheater	19th century		Huntington Avenue		
Puritan Theatre	1905 circa	1960s	Washington Street		
RKO-Boston	1930s	1950s	Washington Street, corner Essex Street		
Scenic Temple	20th century		Berkeley Street and Warren Avenue		
School-Street Opera House	19th century		School Street		
Scollay Square Olympia Theatre	20th century				
Scollay Theatre	1913	1962	Tremont Row		
Seville Theatre	1930 circa	1970 circa	East Boston		
Siege of Paris Opera House	1879				
Selwyn's Theatre	1867	1870	Washington Street		
Selwyn Theatre	1921		Park Square		
Shawmut Theatre	20th century		Blue Hill Avenue		
St. James	20th century		Huntington Avenue		
Star Theatre	20th century		Tremont Row		
St. James Theatre	19th century		Washington Street		
Suffolk Drive-In	1955 circa	1970 circa	East Boston		
Superb Theatre	20th century		Columbus Avenue		
Theatre Comique	1860s		Washington Street		
Theatre Comique	1906		Tremont Row		
Toy Theatre	1914		Dartmouth Street		
Tremont Theatre	1827		Tremont Street		
Tremont Theatre, Studio Building	1860s		Tremont Street		
Tremont Theatre	1889		Tremont Street		
Union's Opera House	1879				
Unique Theatre	20th century		Washington Street		
Vaudeville Saloon	1840				
Waldron's Casino	20th century		Hanover Street		
Washington Gardens	19th century		Common Street		
Washington Hall	1833		Washington Street		
Washington Theatre	20th century		Washington Street		
Washingtonian Hall	1842		Court Street		
Williams Hall	1855 circa		Washington Street		
Windsor Theatre	1881 circa		Dover Street		
World's Museum	1885	1892	661-667 Washington Street	The successor to the theatre and dime museum Boylston Museum which existed at 667 Washington St. The adjacent properties were purchased by the Boylston Museum's owner, George E. Lothrop, for the purposes of expanding both the theatre and museum. The newly expanded enterprise opened as the World's Museum on November 9, 1885. It is also known as the World's Theatre. It was sold and became the Lyceum Theatre in 1892.	
The Zoo	1896		Boylston Street		
