= Gaiety Theatre, Boston =

Gaiety Theatre, Boston may refer to:

- Gaiety Theatre, Boston (1878), Boston, Massachusetts,
- Gaiety Theatre, Boston (1908), Boston, Massachusetts
