= Horatio J. Homer =

American police officer (1848–1923)

Horatio Julius Homer
- Born: May 24, 1848; Farmington, Connecticut
- Died: January 9, 1923 (aged 74); Boston, Massachusetts
- Resting place: Evergreen Cemetery
- Spouses: Sophia A. Williams; Lydia Spriggs
- Children: Horatio Homer, Jr. David L. Homer

Horatio J. Homer (May 24, 1848 – January 9, 1923) was an American police officer. Notable for being Boston's first African American police officer, he was hired by the Boston Police Department in 1878 and served on the force for 40 years.

== Early life ==
Homer was born in Farmington, Connecticut, on May 24, 1848, to Sarah Fields and Charles Homer. He attended public schools in Farmington until he was twelve. At the age of 14, he left the farm and took a job as a hotel bellhop in Waterbury, Connecticut. During his youth he traveled quite a bit and held a variety of jobs, including steward on a steamboat that ran between Boston and Bangor, and a Pullman porter on a car that ran between Philadelphia and Pittsburgh.

He moved to Boston in 1873 and worked as a waiter, first at the Commonwealth Hotel on Washington Street and later at the Hotel Brunswick at Boylston and Clarendon. In 1878 he began working as a janitor at the Globe Theatre on Washington Street.

== Police career ==
While working at the Globe Theatre, Homer met a group of influential men who suggested he become a police officer. One of those men was probably John J. Smith, who was serving on the Boston Common Council at the time and is credited with getting Homer appointed to the police department. Homer was appointed on December 24, 1878, by Police Commissioner Henry S. Russell. He was connected to Station 4, but spent most of his time guarding the entrance to the Office of the Police Commission in Pemberton Square.

Homer passed the civil service examination on September 11, 1895. The day before the exam, he was profiled in the Boston Daily Globe, in which a reporter wrote, "That he will pass the examination there is no doubt, for he is exceedingly well versed in police duties." He was promoted to the rank of sergeant by Police Commissioner Martin on September 23.

In the course of his 40-year career, Homer saw Boston's police force grow from 746 men to 1,700. He met every president from Rutherford B. Hayes to Woodrow Wilson, and served as an escort for a number of foreign ambassadors. He was known for his diplomatic and courteous demeanor. Remarkably, he only had to resort to violence once: when an unwelcome visitor refused to leave the police commissioner's office, Homer took him by the neck and threw him out. Six more black officers were hired during Homer's tenure, on his personal recommendation. He retired from the force on January 29, 1919, at the age of 70.

== Personal life ==
When he was seventeen, Homer married Sophia A. Williams of Haddam, Connecticut; Sophia died in 1902. He married Lydia Spriggs of Deer Creek, Maryland, on November 3, 1903. The couple had two sons, Horatio Jr. and David Lawrence.

Homer was a gifted musician, proficient in a wide variety of instruments including the violin, viola, cello, double bass, flute, clarinet, trombone, guitar, mandolin, phonoharp, and piano. He had a remarkable and possibly eidetic memory, and enjoyed studying history, science, poetry, and languages, as well as collecting coins and creating art with cancelled postage stamps. He was an active member of the Fraternal Association, a charitable group of local black businessmen and civic leaders.

He died at his home at 82 Humboldt Avenue in Roxbury on January 9, 1923, aged 74. Following a funeral at the Ebenezer Baptist Church, he was buried at the Evergreen Cemetery in Brighton.

== Memorials ==
Homer was featured in several Boston Daily Globe articles during his lifetime, but was largely forgotten by the public after his death. In 2010, his historic role was rediscovered by police archivist Margaret Sullivan and Boston Police Officer Robert Anthony, the Department's historian. Later that year, police and city officials arranged to have a headstone installed at his grave, Sgt Horatio J. Homer and his wife, Lydia, who, for the past 87 years rested in an unmarked grave and forgotten. They held a memorial service attended by over 400 officers. A plaque in his honor hangs at the Area B-2 police precinct in Roxbury.

== See also ==
- History of African Americans in Boston
