= Boston Theatre (disambiguation) =

Boston Theatre may refer to:

Boston, Massachusetts, USA

- Federal Street Theatre (1793-1852), also known as the Boston Theatre, corner of Federal St. and Franklin St.
- The Boston Theatre (1854-1925), no.539 Washington St.
- Keith-Albee Boston Theatre (1925-1930s), no.616 Washington St., corner of Essex St.
