= Bijou Theatre (Boston) =

Coordinates: 42°21′15.52″N 71°3′44.26″W

- Bijou Opera House, Bijou Dream Theatre, B.F. Keith's Bijou Theatre, RKO Bijou Theatre, Intown Theatre
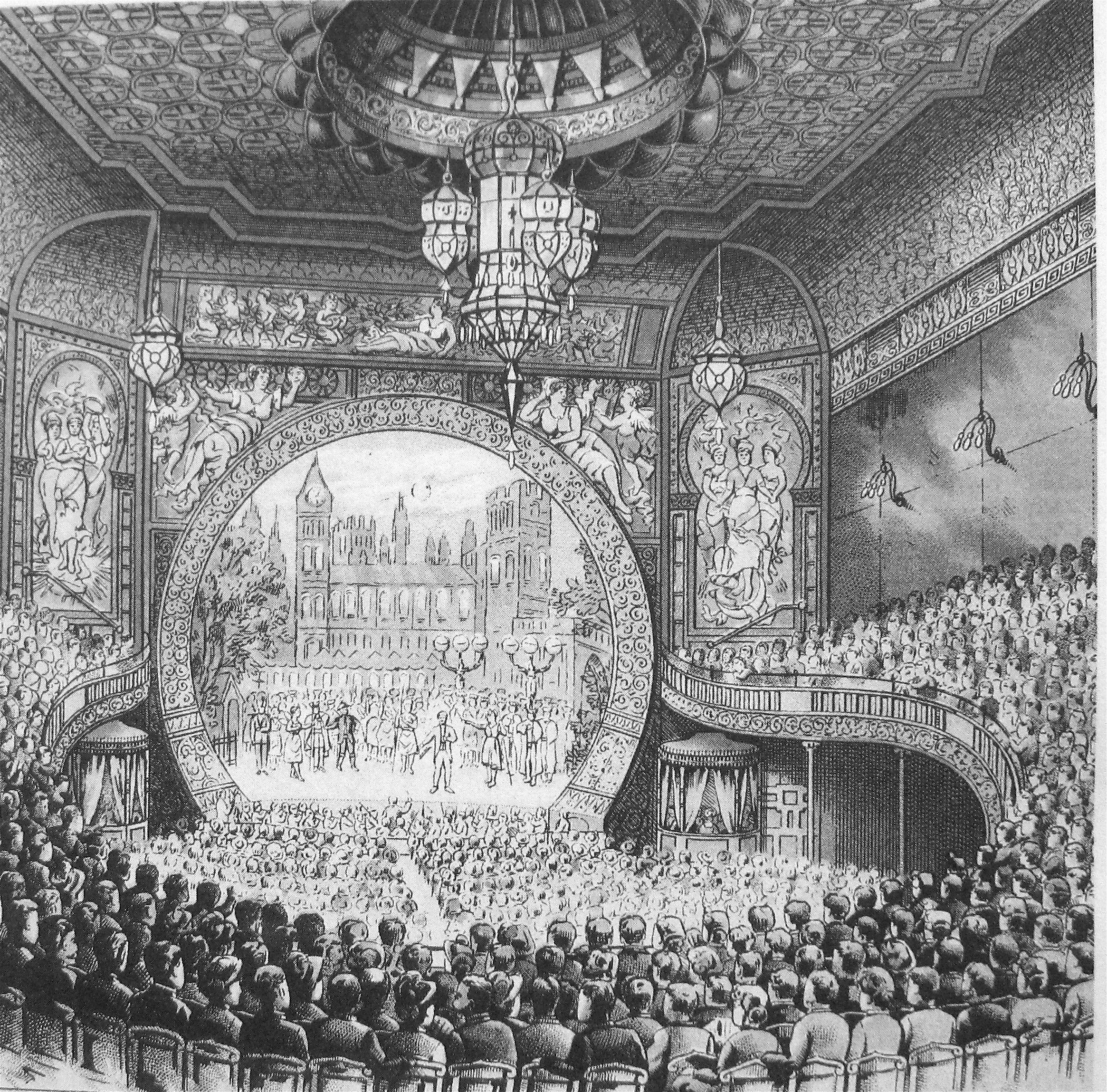
- Bijou interior, 19th century
- Interactive map of Bijou Theatre
- Address: 545 Washington Street; Boston, Massachusetts; United States
- Operator: Emerson College

Construction
- Opened: December 11, 1882
- Closed: 1943
- Years active: 1882-1943
- Architect: Bradlee, Winslow & Wetherell

The Bijou Theatre (1882–1943) in Boston, Massachusetts, occupied the second floor of 545 Washington Street near today's Theatre District. Architect George Wetherell designed the space, described by a contemporary reviewer as "dainty." Proprietors included Edward Hastings, George Tyler, and B.F. Keith. Around the 1900s, it featured a "staircase of heavy glass under which flowed an illuminated waterfall." The Bijou "closed 31 December 1943 and was razed in 1951." The building's facade still exists. It is currently a pending Boston Landmark by the Boston Landmarks Commission.

== Background ==
The building was constructed in 1836 as The Lion Theatre, and in 1839 was renamed The Melodeon. In 1878, the name was changed to The Gaiety. It was also named The Mechanics Institute, Melodeon Varieties, and the New Melodeon. The Gaiety was purchased by George H. Tyler (who also ran The Park Theatre) and by Frederick Vokes, who had renovated the Gaiety, and wanted to rename it the Bijou Theatre. Vokes would relinquish his share, and Tyler would replace him with E.H. and T.N. Hastings. The Bijou officially opened on December 11, 1882.

== The Bijou ==
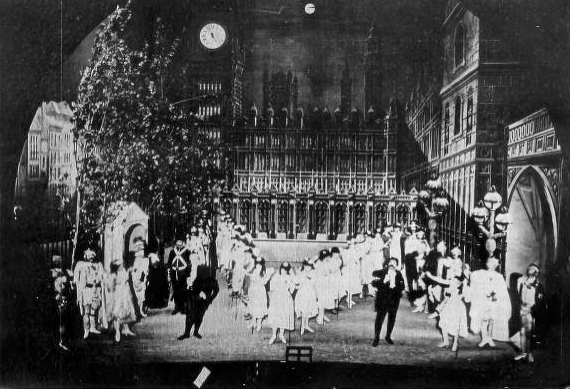
Gilbert and Sullivan's Iolanthe at the Bijou, 1884

The new theatre opened on December 11, 1882 with the Arthur Sullivan and W.S. Gilbert (Gilbert and Sullivan) comic opera Iolanthe. By September 27, 1886, the theatre became owned by B.F. Keith and George R. Batcheller. On March 24, 1894, Keith opened a theatre next the Bijou named "B.F. Keith’s Theatre". In 1901, it was renamed the "Bijou Opera House". The Bijou would later be named "Bijou Dream" when it became a movie house in 1927, and also became known as Intown sometime after that.

The Bijou was a distinct theatre for a couple of reasons. The Bijou was the first theatre in the United States to be elementarily lighted by electricity, which Thomas Edison personally installed and supervised. It also was unique for the fact that it did not have a traditional exit to the outside. Since it was on the second floor, the exits led to the lobbies of the two surrounding theatres, the B.F. Keith Theatre (later the Normandie and Laffmovie) and the newer Keith Memorial (later known as the Savoy and is now the Boston Opera House). After the tragic 1942 Cocoanut Grove fire (492 deaths), Boston heavily enforced new fire laws, and since the Bijou did not have adequate exits, it was forced to close.

The Bijou was razed to the orchestra and stage floors, which became the roof of the stores below. Most of what remained of the Bijou building was demolished in 2008, but Emerson College bought the property and plans to make the Bijou and Paramount Theatre into theatres and dormitories.

== Images ==
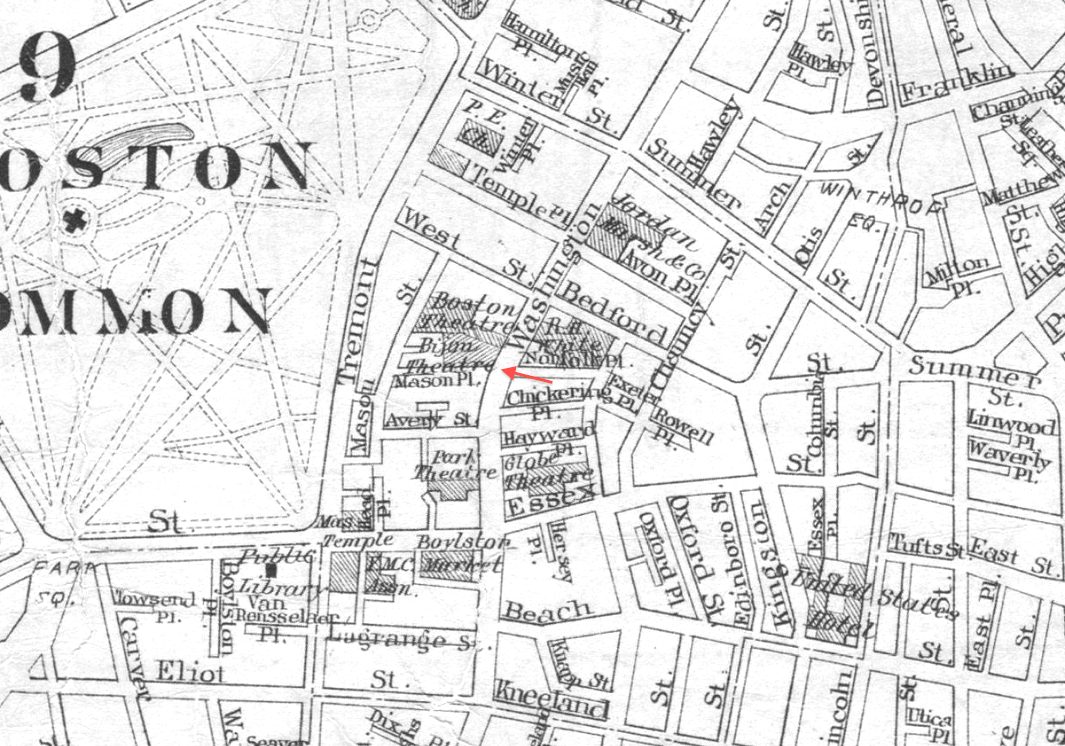
Detail of 1886 map of Boston, showing the Bijou adjacent to the Boston Theatre

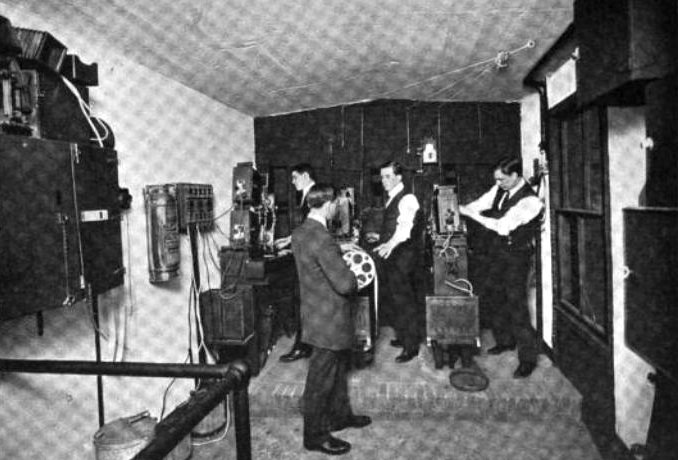
Film projection room, 1911

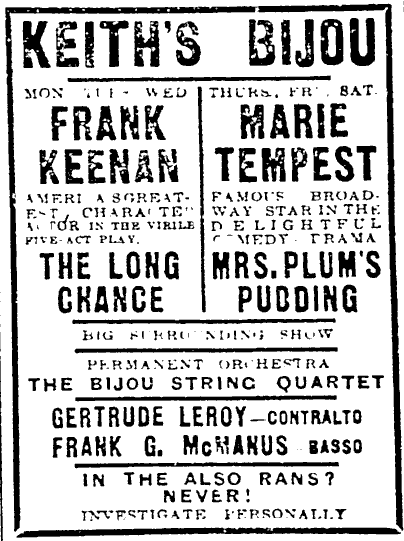
Advertisement, 1915, for Frank Keenan, Marie Tempest, Bijou String Quartet

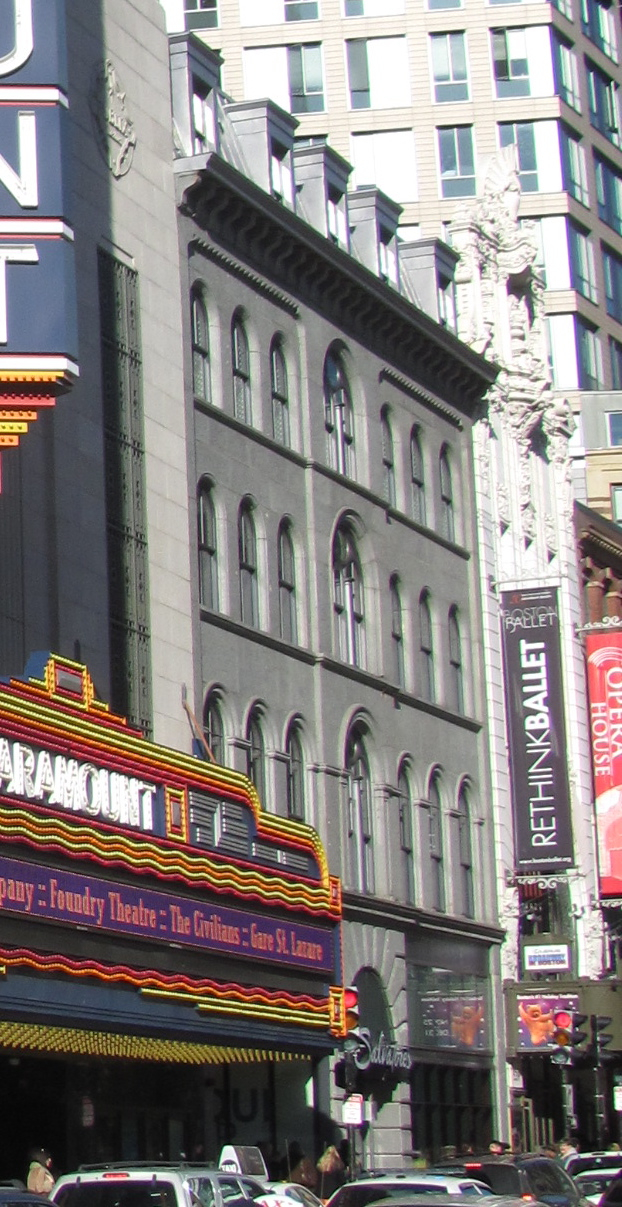
Facade of former Bijou in 2011; between Paramount Theatre (at left), and Boston Opera House (at right)

== Variant names ==
- Bijou Opera House
- Bijou Dream Theatre
- B.F. Keith's Bijou Theatre
- RKO Bijou Theatre
- Intown Theatre
