= Beethoven Hall (Boston) =

Coordinates: 42°21′9.86″N 71°3′45.35″W

Beethoven Hall (1874–78) was an auditorium in Boston, Massachusetts, that hosted musical performances and other entertainments in the 1870s. It sat on Washington Street, near Boylston Street, in today's Boston Theater District/Chinatown neighborhood. The architect was William Washburn, who had also designed the first National Theatre and the second Tremont Temple.

In 1879 the renovated hall re-opened as the Park Theatre. The building survived until 1990, when it was razed.

== Performances ==
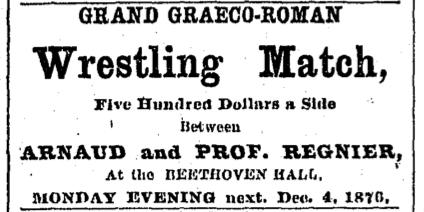
Advertisement for wrestling match "between Arnaud and Prof. Regnier," Beethoven Hall, Boston, 1876

- Annie de Montford, mesmerist
- Charlotte Cushman
- Mrs. Adelia Dauncey Maskell ("celebrated English Star Reader")
- Berger Family and Sol Smith Russell
- Buckley's Serenaders
- Callender's Georgia Minstrels
- Marius Cazeneuve's "grand soirees of prestidigitation and anti-spiritualistic seances"
- Buffalo Bill combination
- Tomasi's Grand Juvenile English Opera
- Brown's Brigade Band
- Lingards and Company
- G.B. Bunnell's "living human wonders from the New American Museum, New York City"
