= Boston Theater District =

- Washington Street Theatre District
- U.S. National Register of Historic Places
- U.S. Historic district
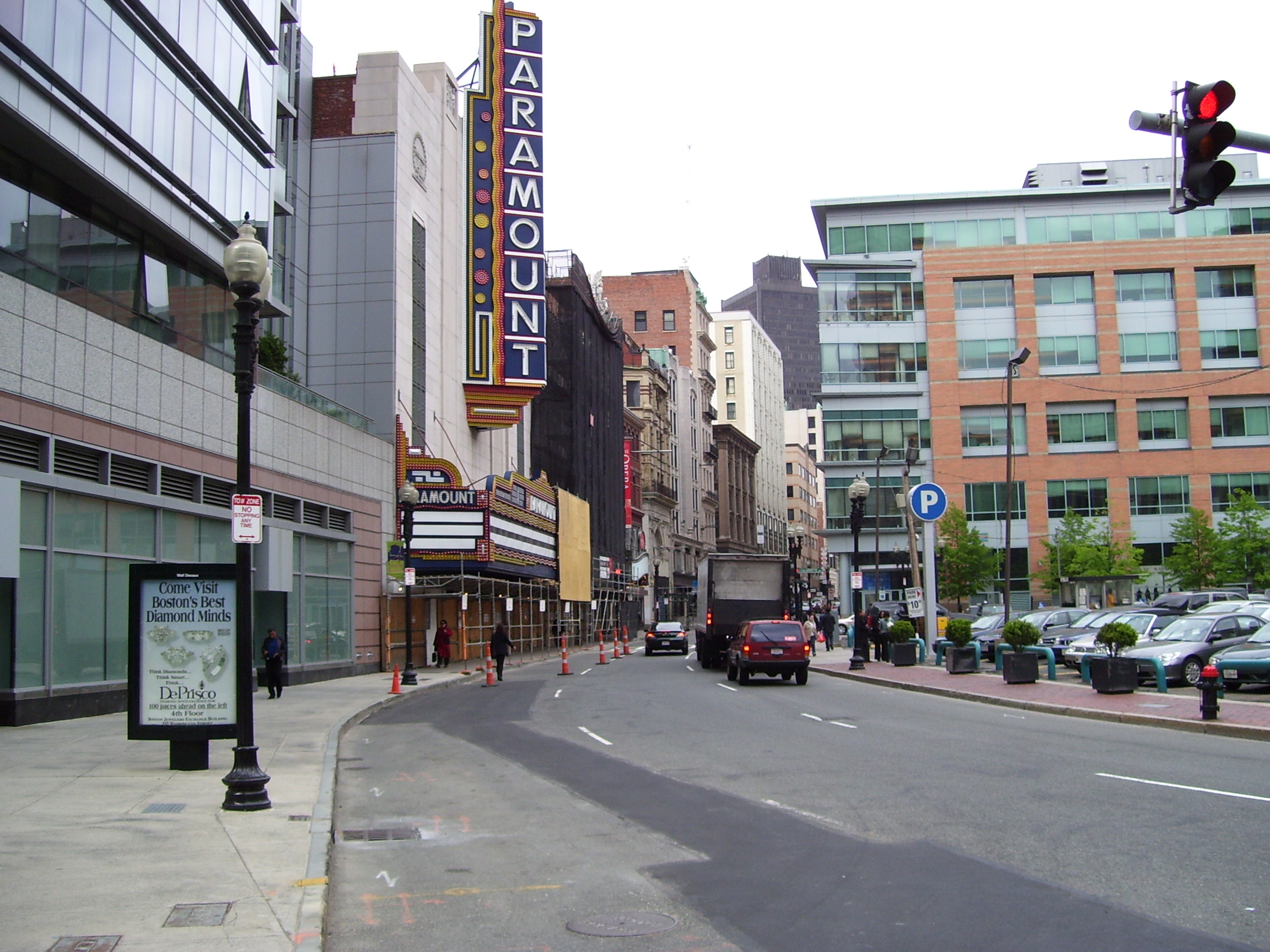

- Location within Boston Location within Massachusetts Location within the United States
- Location: Boston, Massachusetts
- Coordinates: 42°21′14″N 71°3′46″W
- Built: 1870
- Architectural style: Late Gothic Revival, Italianate
- NRHP reference No.: 79000370
- Added to NRHP: March 19, 1979

The Boston Theater District is the center of Boston's theater scene. Many of its theaters are on Washington Street, Tremont Street, Boylston Street, and Huntington Avenue.

== History ==
Plays were banned in Boston by the Puritans until 1792. Boston's first theater opened in 1793. In 1900, the Boston Theater District had 31 theaters, with 50,000 seats. In the 1940s, the city had over 50 theaters. Since the 1970s, developers have renovated old theaters.

== Revitalization ==
Suffolk University bought the Modern Theater in 2008. It has since reopened and hosts a variety of performances. For their efforts, Suffolk won a Preservation Honor Award from the National Trust for Historic Preservation in 2011.

Emerson College now uses the Paramount Theater as a "mixed-use residential, academic, and performance venue."

== Washington Street Theatre District ==
The Washington Street Theatre District, consisting of seven buildings on the west side of Washington Street (numbers 511-559), was listed on the National Register of Historic Places in 1979. Buildings in the district include the Boston Opera House, built on the site of the city's second theater. Its entrance hall is the city's only surviving work of noted theater designer Thomas W. Lamb. Also in the district are the 1932 Paramount Theatre and the Modern Theatre. These theaters and their predecessors have displayed the gamut of theatrical entertainment across more than two centuries, including vaudeville, comedy, and film.

== Theaters ==
- Boch Center:

- Shubert Theatre
- Wang Theater

- Berklee Performance Center
- Boston Opera House
- Charles Playhouse
- Cutler Majestic Theatre
- Colonial Theatre
- The Lyric Stage Company of Boston
- Modern Theatre
- Orpheum Theatre
- Paramount Theatre
- Wilbur Theatre
- Huntington Theatre Company

== See also ==
- List of former theatres in Boston
- Boston Theater Critics Association
- Boston Theater Marathon
- Buffalo Theater District
- Cleveland Theater District
- Houston Theater District
- Broadway Theater District (Los Angeles)
- Theater District, Manhattan
