= Gaiety Theatre (Boston, 1908) =

Coordinates: 42°21′6.27″N 71°3′46.04″W

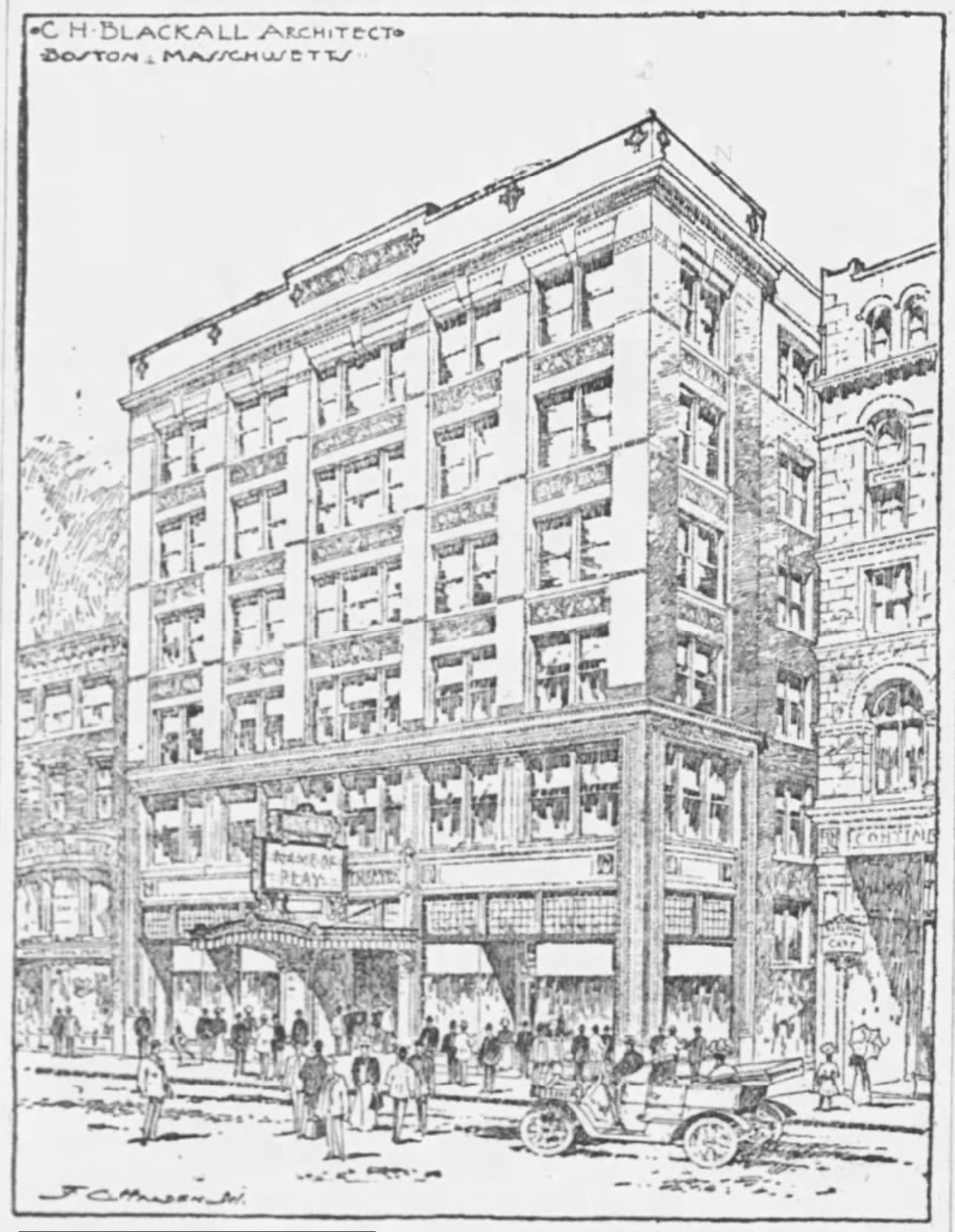
Sketch of the Gaiety Theatre drawn by architect C. H. Blackall. Published before the theatre's construction in The Boston Globe on June 10, 1908.

The Gaiety Theatre (1908–1949) or Gayety Theatre of Boston, Massachusetts, was located at no.661 Washington Street near Boylston Street in today's Boston Theater District. The theatre was designed by architect Clarence H. Blackall. The Lyceum Theatre was demolished in June 1908 to make way for the Gaiety Theatre which was built on the same site.

The Gaiety Theatre featured burlesque, vaudeville and cinema. Performers included Clark and McCullough, Solly Ward, and Lena Daley; producers included Charles H. Waldron, Earl Carroll, and E.M. Loew. In 1949 it became the "Publix Theatre." The building existed until its razing in 2005.

== Images ==
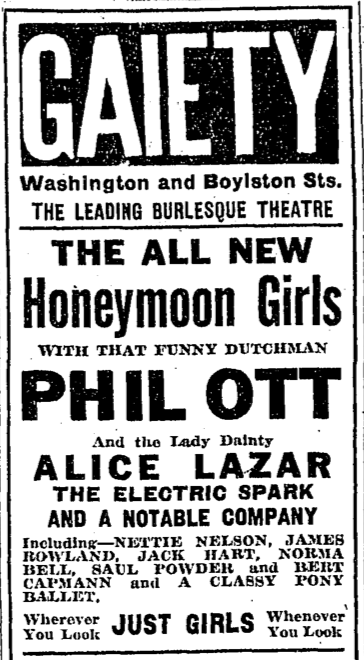
Advertisement, 1915: "Honeymoon Girls with that funny Dutchman Phil Ott and the lady dainty Alice Lazar the electric spark"

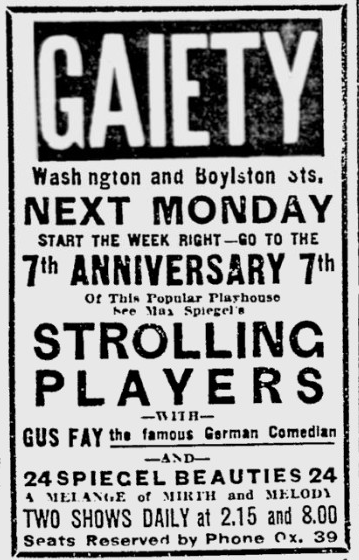
Advertisement, 1915: "Max Spiegel's Strolling Players with Gus Fay the famous German comedian"

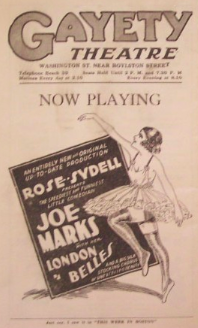
Advertisement, 1920: Rose Sydell, Joe Marks, London Belles
