= Chinese Museum (Boston) =

Former museum in Boston, Massachusetts

Coordinates: 42°21′22.97″N 71°3′36.27″W

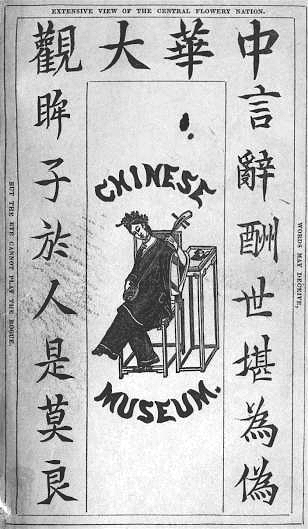
Cover of guidebook to the museum, 1845

The Chinese Museum (1845–1847) in Boston, Massachusetts, showed to the public some 41 cases displaying approximately 800 objects related to Chinese fine arts, agriculture, costume, and other customs. It was located on Washington Street in the Marlboro Chapel (between Bromfield and Winter Streets).

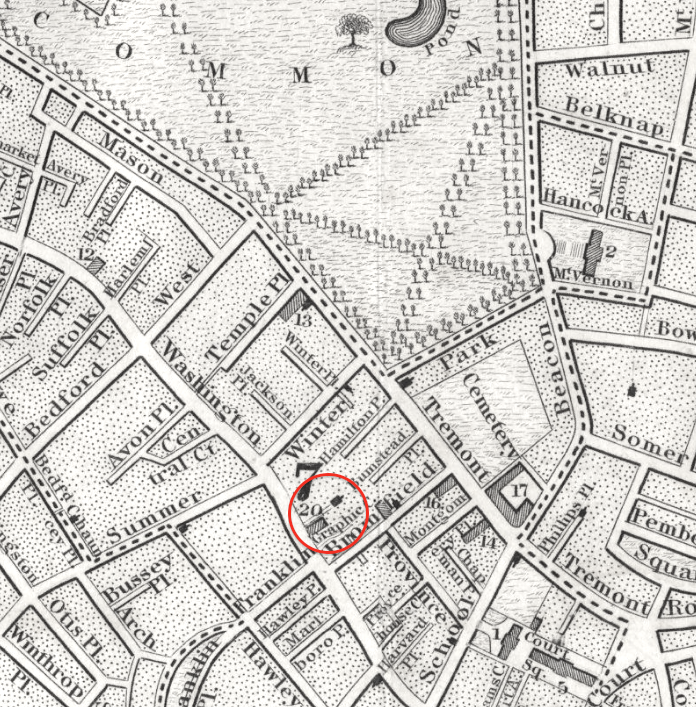
Detail of 1844 map of Boston, showing vicinity of the museum off Washington Street

Items exhibited included:

- "Long-gans. 'Dragon's eyes': so called from their resemblance to the ball of the eye: a favorite fruit with the Chinese, but not suited to the palate of 'barbarians.'"
- "Vermicelli, made and extensively used by the Chinese in soups, of which they are fond and make a great variety."
- "Nanking machine toys of different construction. These toys contain machinery inside, and when wound up possess the power of locomotion for a short time."
- "Different kinds of caps worn by gentlemen in winter."
- "Enameled Jos vase to hang on the wall beneath the painting of an idol. This is made in the form of half an oo-loo or bottle gourd, a Chinese emblem of longevity."
- "Ee-een. The two stringed fiddle. The rebeck of the Chinese."
- "Tai-Kam. The bass fiddle. This is very much like the ee-een, except that the drum is made of cocoa nut shell instead of bamboo, and its notes are gruffer."
- "Facsimile of an apartment in a wealthy Chinaman's dwelling. ... A large and beautiful screen made of paintings on glass; chairs and tables made of king wood with variegated marble tops, superbly embroidered door screen, vase containing a peacock feather fan of 200 eyes, fruit upon the table, scrolls on the wall, lanterns suspended from the ceiling, &c. &c."

By 1847 the museum "ceased to be attractive and profitable, and ... was removed to Philadelphia."
