= Germania Musical Society =

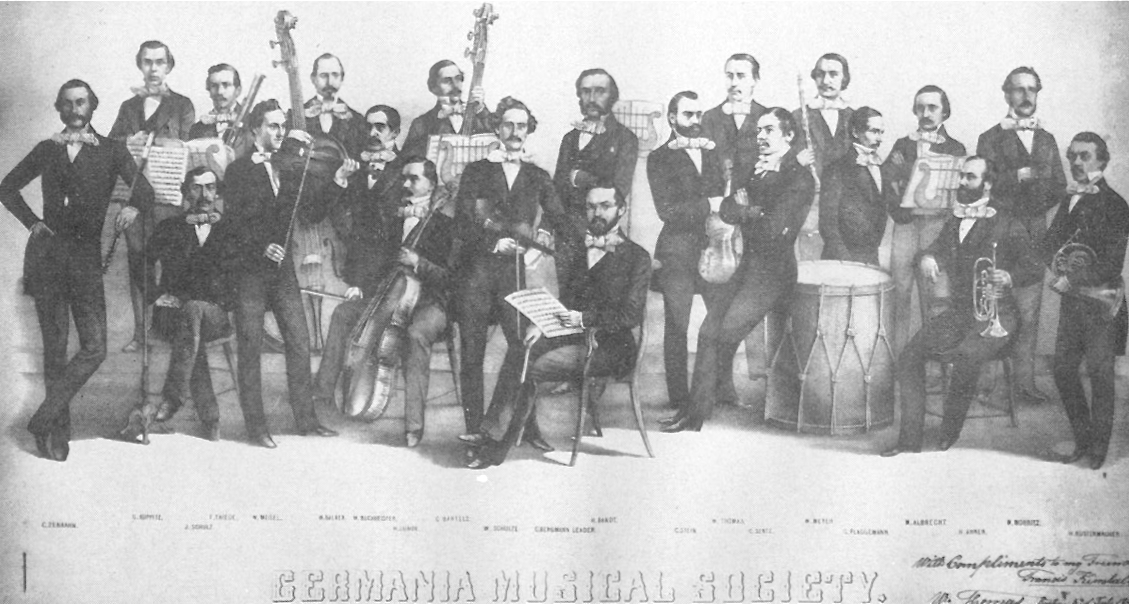
Germania Musical Society

The Germania Musical Society (1848–1854) was an orchestra that performed in the United States in the mid-19th century. Its musicians emigrated from Germany after a successful tour of England. Carl Lenschow and Carl Bergmann served as directors. The group toured throughout the country. Concerts took place in the Melodeon and the Music Hall, Boston; Brinley Hall and City Hall, Worcester, Massachusetts; Astor Opera House, New York City; Metropolitan Hall, New York City; Ocean Hall, Newport, Rhode Island; Westminster Hall, Providence; and elsewhere.

The group met with particular success in Boston, where they performed Mendelssohn's "Overture" to A Midsummer Night's Dream 39 times at 22 concerts, and spent the summer in Newport, Rhode Island. In 1852 they settled in Boston and remained for three years before disbanding. They performed regularly in the oratorio performances of the Handel and Haydn Society, which gave Boston's first performance of Beethoven's Ninth Symphony with the Germania Orchestra under the baton of the Germania's conductor Carl Bergmann on April 2, 1853. A reviewer in the Journal of Music wrote: "It was the unanimous feeling that the 'Germanians' covered themselves with glory upon the occasion."

By one account:

In the fall of 1854 the Germania Musical Society came to an end at the height of its fame. ... Many of the players were determined to establish permanent homes and avoid the discomforts of touring. The Society had given approximately seven hundred concerts in the United States and one hundred matinees and soirees. ... The total sum of public performances exceeded nine hundred, with more than one million listeners.

Band members, who had become U.S. citizens, settled in Baltimore, Boston, New York, Philadelphia, Syracuse and Chicago.
