= Gaiety Theatre (Boston, 1878) =

Coordinates: 42°21′15.52″N 71°3′44.26″W

The Gaiety Theatre (1878-1882) of Boston, Massachusetts, was located on Washington Street on the block between West and Avery Streets. J. Wentworth oversaw its operations. It occupied the former Melodeon. The Gaiety's 800-seat auditorium featured "walls and ceiling ... panelled in pink, with buff, gold and purple borders; the balcony fronts ... bronze, gray, and pink." In 1882 it became the Bijou Theatre.
