= Theatre Comique (Boston) =

Former theater (1865-1869) in Boston, Massachusetts

Coordinates: 42°21′17″N 71°3′37″W

Theatre Comique (1865–1869) of Boston, Massachusetts, was located at no. 240 Washington Street. Personnel included Jason Wentworth, William H. Crisp, James S. Maffitt, George Maffitt, B.F. Lowell, Wm. H. Daly, orchestra leader Aug. Muller, and maitre de ballet Signor Constantine. Among the performances: slack rope and acrobatics by Martini Chiriski and the Levantine Brothers; Mlle. Augusta, danseuse; "Aladdin" with Kate Pennoyer and W.H. Bartholomew; dancing by Betty Regl; Snow Brothers (William and Benjamin Snow); Morlacchi Ballet Troupe; Wilson Brothers (Louis and George Wilson); Ada Harland; and Jarrett & Palmer's "Forty Thieves." It occupied the building formerly known as Andrews Hall, Barnum's Aquarial Gardens, and the Boston Aquarial and Zoological Gardens. In 1869 the theatre was renamed the "Adelphi Theatre."

== Images ==
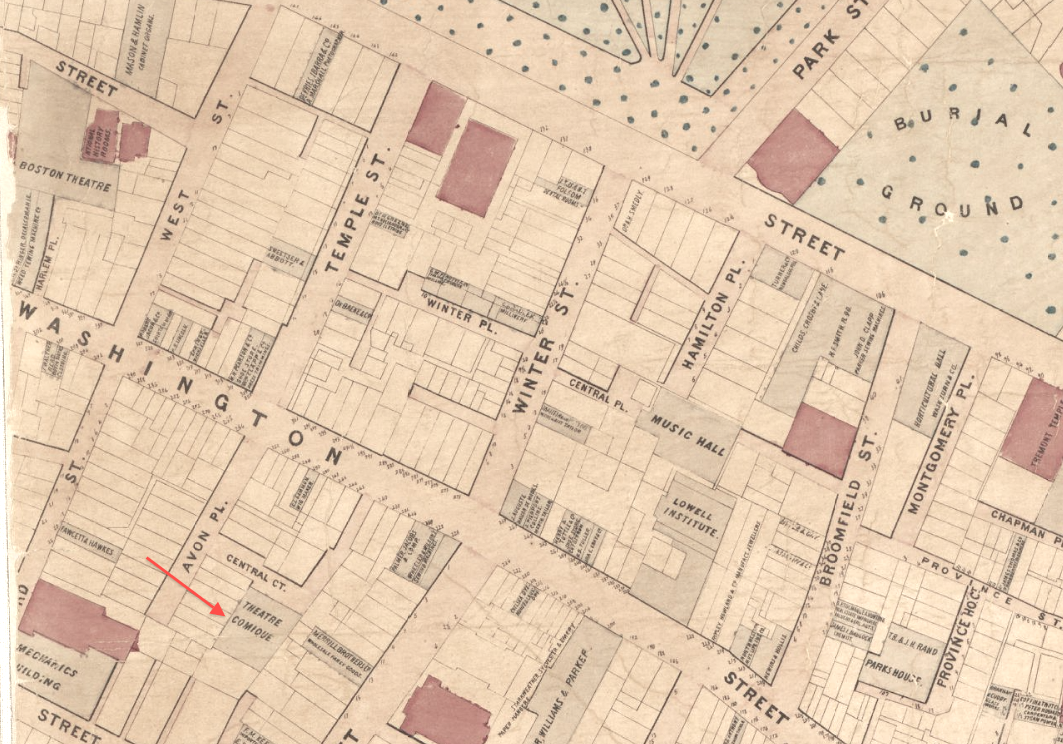
Detail of 1869 map of Boston, showing Theatre Comique on Central Court, off Washington Street

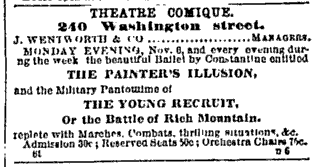
Advertisement, 1865

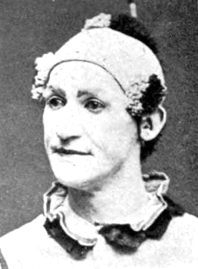
Portrait of actor James S. Maffitt, affiliated with the theatre
