= Globe Theatre (Boston, 1871) =

Theatre in Boston, Massachusetts, United States

Coordinates: 42°21′10.61″N 71°3′45.19″W

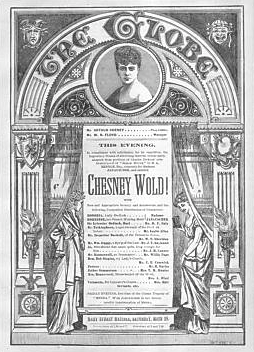
Programme for performance of H.A. Rendle's "Chesney Wold," 1873

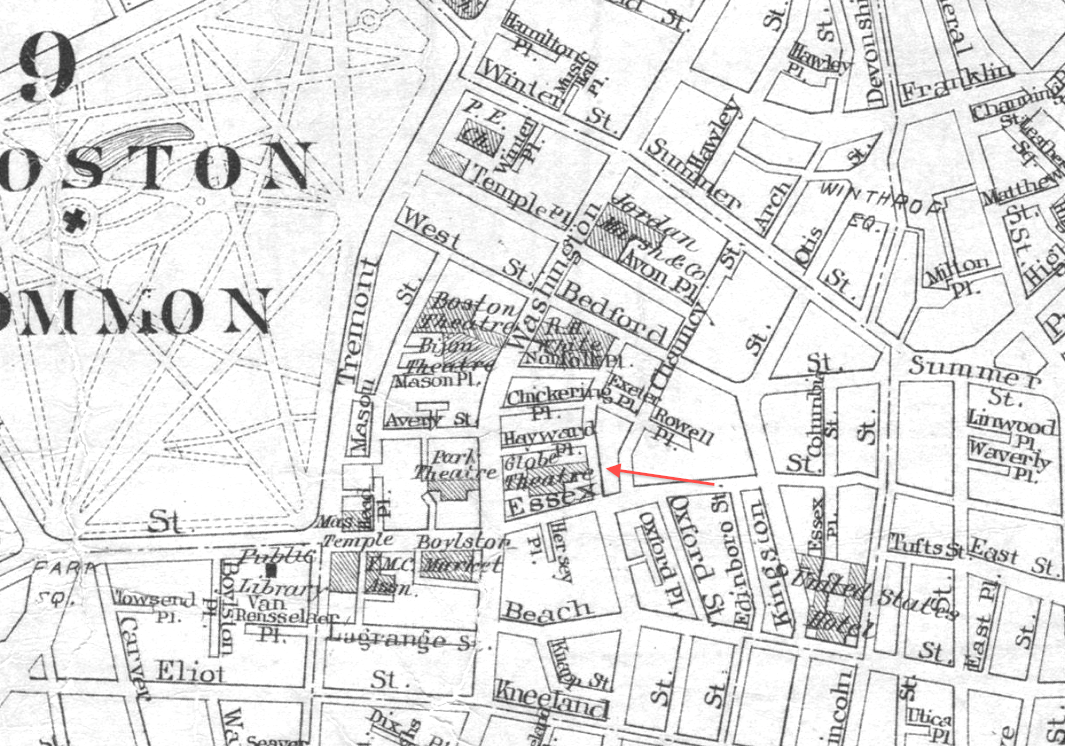
Detail of 1886 map of Boston, showing Globe Theatre

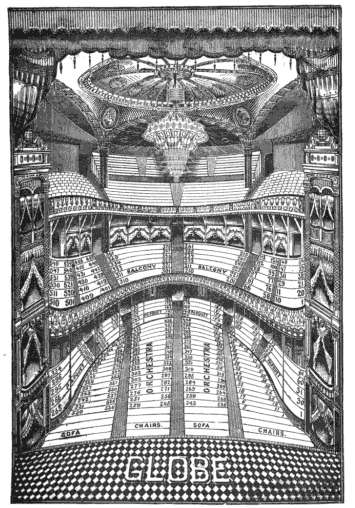
Seating chart, 1883

The Globe Theatre (est.1871) was a playhouse in Boston, Massachusetts, in the 19th century. It was located at 598 Washington Street, near the corner of Essex Street. Arthur Cheney oversaw the Globe until 1876. From 1871 to 1873 it occupied the former theatre of John H. Selwyn. After a fire in May 1873, the Globe re-opened on the same site in December 1874. Architect Benjamin F. Dwight designed the new building. From 1877 to 1893 John Stetson served as proprietor; some regarded him as "a theatrical producer with a reputation for illiteracy in his day such as Samuel Goldwyn has achieved" in the 1960s. The theatre burned down in January 1894.

Horatio J. Homer, Boston's first African-American police officer, worked as a janitor at the Globe Theatre before being hired by the Boston Police Department.

== Performances ==
=== 1870s ===
- H.A. Rendle's Chesney Wold, with Madame Janauschek
- Henry VIII starring Charlotte Cushman as Katherine Queen of England
- Fox's Humpty Dumpty
- Augustin Daly's Pique, with Miss Jeffries-Lewis
- E.A. Sothern as Lord Dundreary
- "Sea of Ice" with Miss Maud Granger as Ocarita and Mr. George Boniface as Carlos, Monday, January 28, 1878
- Eliza Weathersby's Froliques
- The Scouts of the Prairie, with Buffalo Bill Cody, Texas Jack Omohundro, Ned Buntline, and Giuseppina Morlacchi, week of March 5, 1873.
- Miss Kate Claxton in Two Orphans

=== 1880s ===
- "Rice's new extravaganza combination in the opera comique Calino"
- Othello, starring Salvini
- L.R. Shewell's Debt of Honor
- Oscar Wilde lecture June 2, 1882
- Oedipus
- 14 Days, with Charles Wyndham
- We, Us & Co., with Mestayer-Vaughn
- Gilbert & Sullivan's Mikado, with Helen Lamont and Signor Brocolini
- As in a Looking-Glass, with Mrs. Langtry
- The Hanlons in "Fantasma"
- Princess Ida
- Ibsen's A Doll's House, with Beatrice Cameron
- The Oolah (1889)

=== 1890s ===
- The Lion Tamer, with Francis Wilson
- Ali Baba, with American Extravaganza Co.
- The Crust of Society
- Prince Karl, with Richard Mansfield
- Hanlon Brothers' "mechanical fairy spectacle Superba"
- La Cigale, with Lillian Russell
