= RKO Boston Theatre =

Movie theatre in Massachusetts

Coordinates: 42°21′9.06″N 71°3′45.27″W

The RKO Boston Theatre is a movie theatre in Boston, Massachusetts, located at 616 Washington Street, near Essex Street in the Boston Theater District. It opened as the Keith-Albee Boston Theatre on October 5, 1925.

== History ==
The building had originally housed the Henry Siegel Co. department store. The theater section was designed by Thomas W. Lamb as part the Keith-Albee-Orpheum chain of vaudeville theatres. Keith-Albee-Orpheum became part of RKO Pictures in 1928, leading to the theater's renaming.

During this time it featured film, big band concerts, and variety theatre performances. Musicians Benny Goodman, Tommy Dorsey, Glenn Miller and others frequently played the theater. A typical show would be preceded by a Class B movie, newsreel and coming attractions. Later, it was used for major event pictures using the latest technologies, such as Cinerama. By the 1970s the theatre was multiplexed, and was called "The Essex", an exploitation movie house.
