= Selwyn's Theatre =

Coordinates: 42°21′10.61″N 71°3′45.19″W

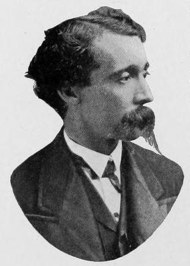
Portrait of John Selwyn, proprietor

Selwyn's Theatre (1867–1870) of Boston, Massachusetts, was established by British-born actor John H. Selwyn. Architect Benjamin F. Dwight designed the building. Personnel included Dexter H. Follet, Arthur Cheney, H.A. M'Glenen, Charles R. Thorne Jr., and Charles Koppitz. In 1871 Selwyn's was renamed the "Globe Theatre."

== Performances ==
- J. Palgrave Simpson's "Dreams of Delusion"
- William Brough's "The Field of the Cloth of Gold"
- T.W. Robertson's "School"
- Watts Phillips' "Maud's Peril"
- F.C. Burnand and Montagu Williams' "Easy Shaving"
- Pelham Hardwicke's "Bachelor of Arts"
- Falconer's "A Wife Well Won"
- Birch, Wambold, Bernard & Backus San Francisco Minstrels
- "Midsummer Night's Dream," with Morlacchi Ballet Troupe
