= Paramount Theatre (Boston) =

Historic theater in Boston, Massachusetts

Paramount Center at Emerson College
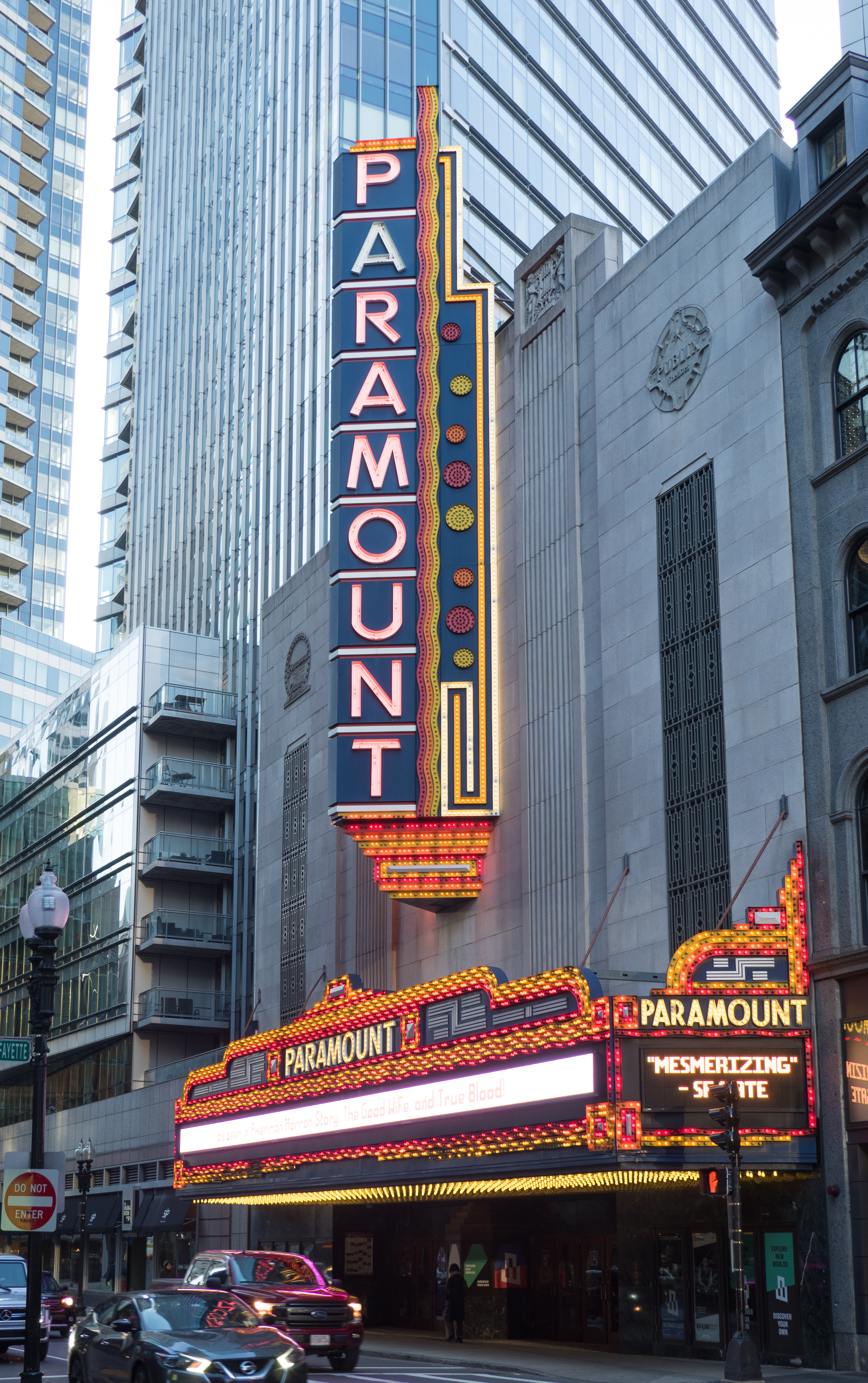
- The Paramount Theatre in 2019
- Interactive map of Paramount Center at Emerson College
- Former names: Paramount Theatre
- Address: 559 Washington Street
- Location: Downtown Boston, Massachusetts
- Coordinates: 42.353705°N 71.062764°W
- Owner: Emerson College
- Operator: Emerson College
- Capacity: Robert J. Orchard Stage: 596; Jackie Liebergott Black Box: 150; Bright Family Screening Room: 170
- Type: Theatre
- Public transit: Boylston, Chinatown, Park Street

Construction
- Architect: Arthur Bowditch

Website
- emersontheatres.org/Online/default.asp

Boston Landmark
- Designated: February 14, 1984

Paramount Theatre is a theatre in Boston on Washington Street, between Avery and West Streets.

== History ==
The Paramount opened in 1932 as a 1,700-seat, single-screen movie theatre. It was one of the first movie houses in Boston to play talking motion pictures. The theatre was named after its original owner, Paramount Pictures. It closed in 1976 and most of the Art Deco interior decoration was destroyed in the 1980s during the removal of asbestos. In 1984, the building was designated a Boston Landmark by the Boston Landmarks Commission.

In 2002, Millennium Partners agreed to restore the Paramount's facade, marquee, and vertical sign in exchange for city approval of their adjacent Ritz-Carlton Towers project. The city occasionally lighted the sign at night. The city's hopes that the site would be developed by the Cambridge-based American Repertory Theater were not fulfilled.

In April 2005, Emerson College announced plans to renovate the Paramount Theatre and build a performing arts facility in and around the original building. The $77 million project involved the renovation of the building and adjacent parcels of land into a complex containing a 550-seat theater, a Performance Development Center, a student residence hall, a 125-seat black box theater, a 170-seat film screening room, eight rehearsal studios ranging from 700 square feet (65 m^{2}) to 1,900 square feet (180 m^{2}), six practice rooms for individuals and small groups, a sound stage for film production classes, a scene shop, several classrooms, a restaurant, and up to a dozen offices for faculty and staff. Design was by Elkus Manfredi Architects, Boston. Acentech Incorporated consulted on the acoustical design of the facility, providing guidance on room acoustics, sound isolation between the stacked spaces on the tight urban site, and mechanical system noise control in the historic building.

The project was completed in early 2010. On March 18, 2010, Emerson College celebrated the grand re-opening of the Paramount Theater with Mayor Thomas Menino.

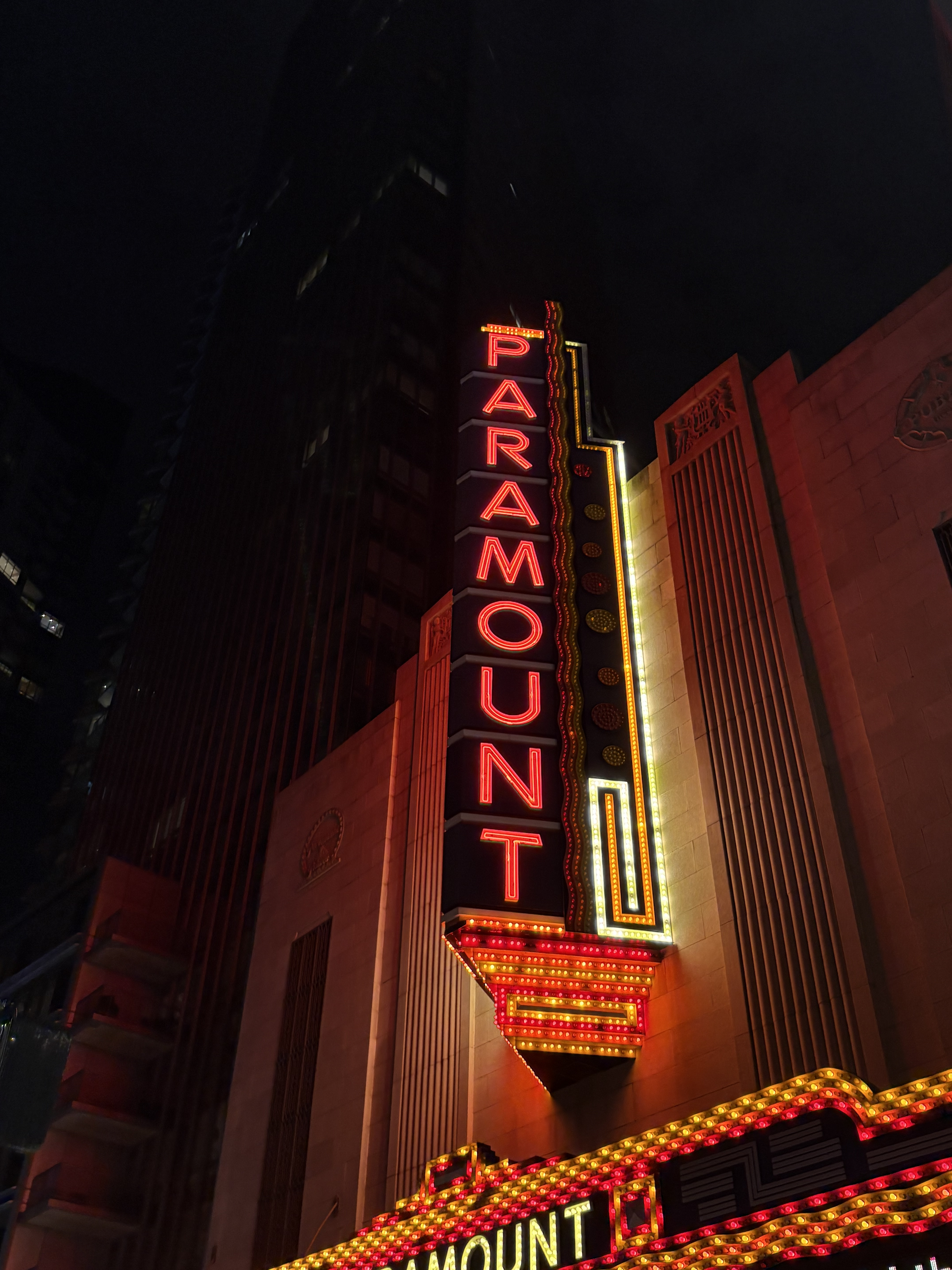
The Theatre at night in 2025

== Sources ==
- Boston Globe: "Paramount Regains its Grandeur," March 3, 2010, accessed March 4, 2010
- Emerson College Today: David Rosen, "Preservation, landmarks expert reviews Paramount Theatre art replicas," October 2008, accessed March 4, 2010
- Emerson College Today: "Paramount Theatre awarded major grant," October 2007, accessed March 4, 2010
- Emerson College Today: "Planning proceeds for College's Paramount Center development on Washington Street," December 2005, accessed March 4, 2010
- Boston Redevelopment Authority: Press Releases: "Mayor Menino, Emerson Take Center Stage in Paramount Theatre Revitalization Plan," April 13, 2005, accessed March 4, 2010
