= Melodeon (Boston, Massachusetts) =

Coordinates: 42°21′15.52″N 71°3′44.26″W

The Melodeon (1839 – c. 1870) was a concert hall and performance space in 19th-century Boston, Massachusetts, located on Washington Street, near West Street. Musical concerts, lectures, sermons, conferences, visual displays, and popular entertainments occurred there.

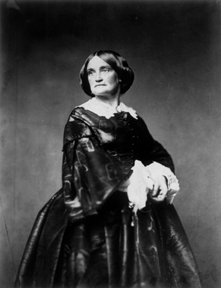
Charlotte Cushman

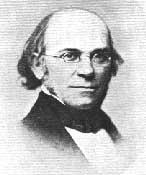
Theodore Parker

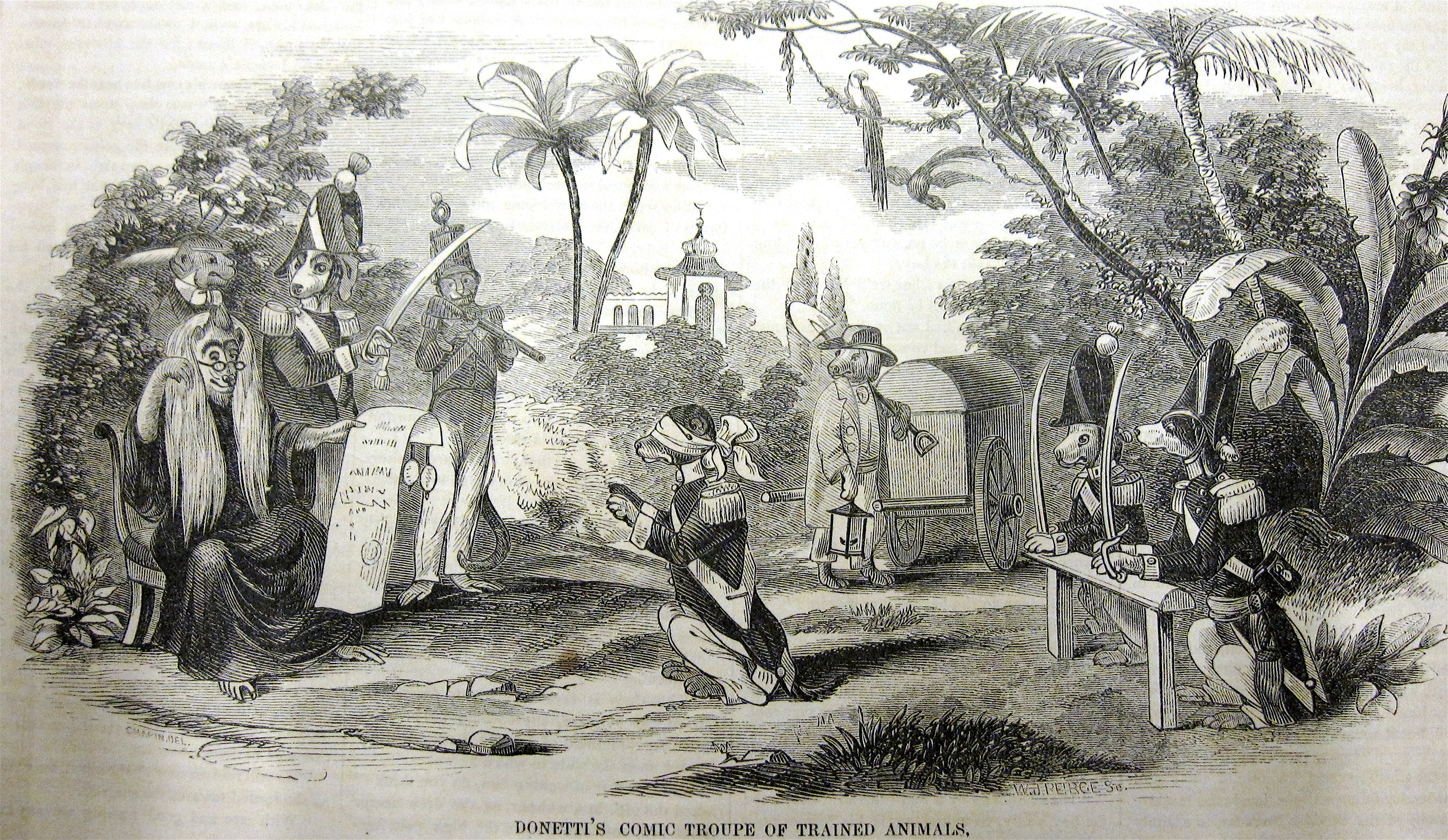
Donetti's Comic Troupe of Trained Animals, 1852

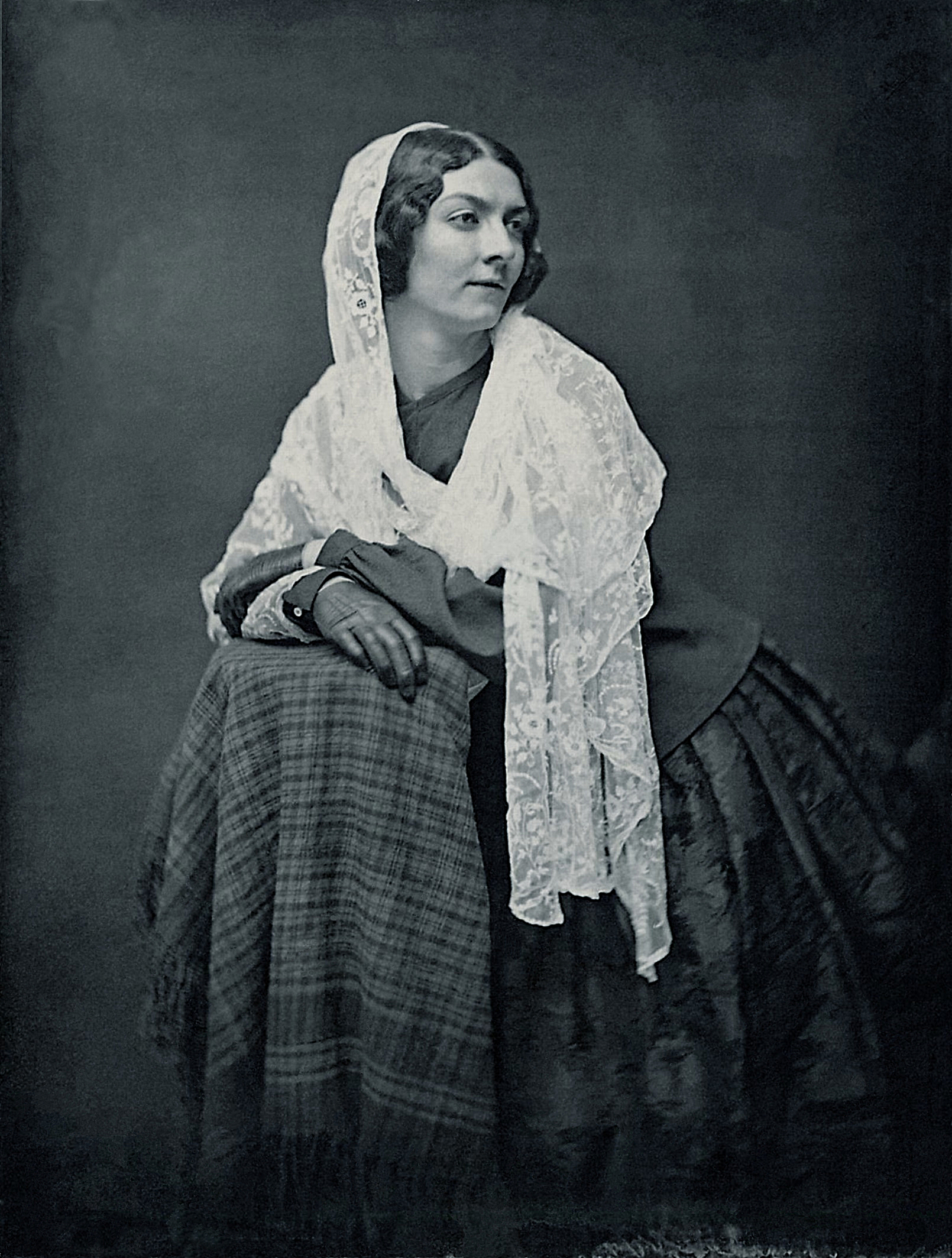
Lola Montez, by Southworth & Hawes, 1851

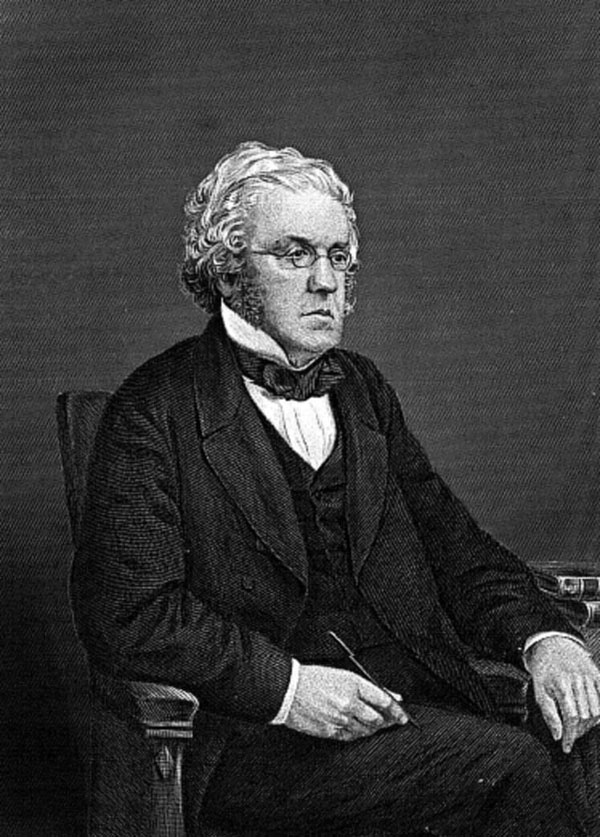
William Makepeace Thackeray

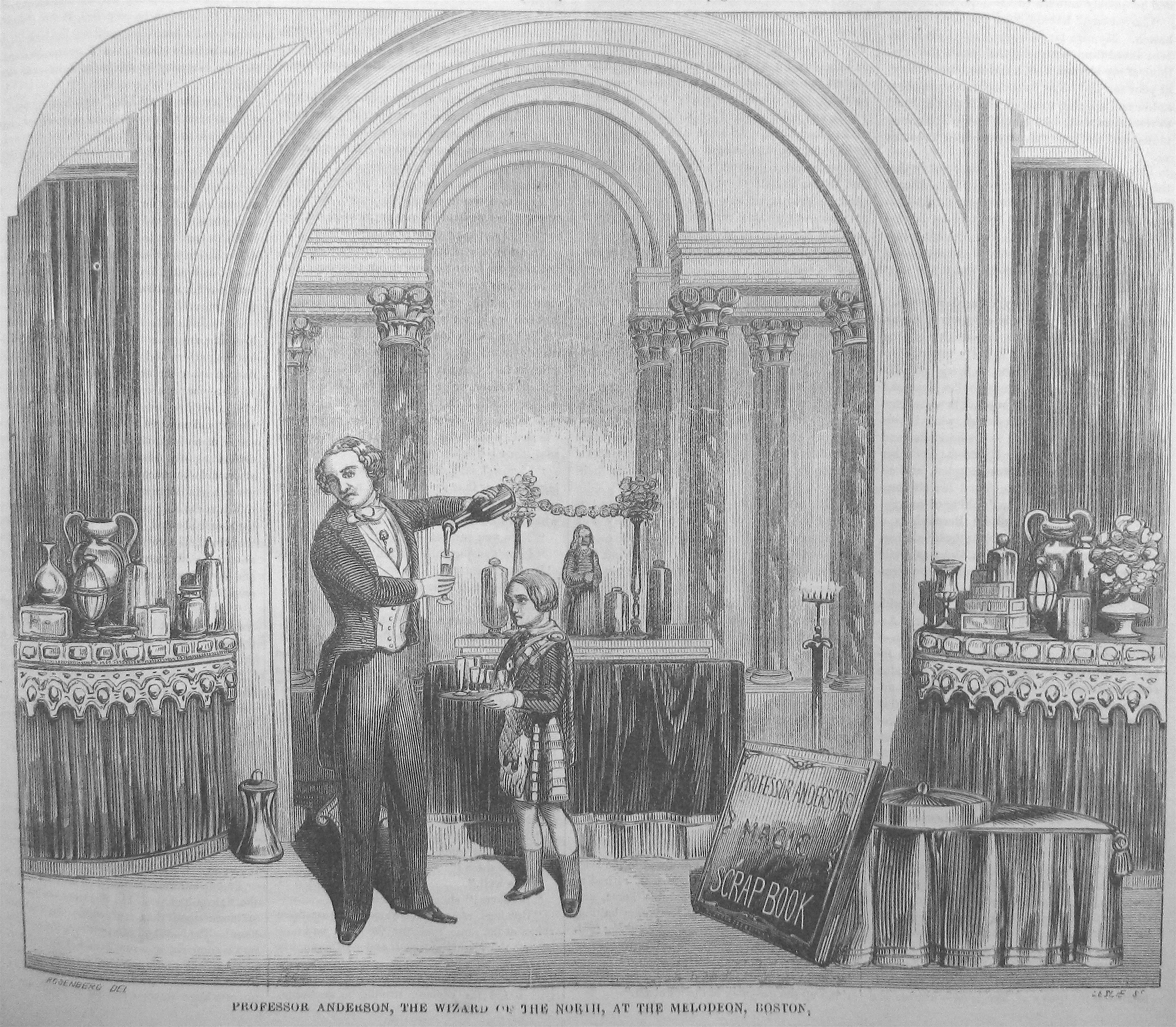
Professor Anderson, Wizard of the North

== History ==
The Melodeon occupied the building of the former Lion Theatre (1836–1839) and Mechanics Institute (1839).

Proprietors of the Melodeon included the Handel and Haydn Society (1839); Leander Rodney (1844); Boston Theatre Company (1852); E. Warden (1857; temporarily renamed The Melodeon Varieties); Charles Francis Adams (1859).

== Performances & events ==
=== 1830s-1840s ===
- 1839
  - Handel and Haydn Society.
- 1840
  - "Soiree musicale. The celebrated Rainer Family, or Tyrolese minstrels."
- 1842
  - Amateur concert for the benefit of the Warren Street Chapel.
  - Mr. Braham.
- 1843
  - Vocal entertainment by H. Russell.
  - Rossini's Stabat Mater, with Handel and Haydn Society.
  - Dr. Lardner
- 1844
  - Concert by Ole Bull, assisted by Miss Stone, Mr. Herwig, Mr. Hayter, and a full orchestra.
  - Henry Phillips, assisted by Miss Stone.
  - William Charles Macready, Charlotte Cushman.
- 1845
  - Massachusetts Charitable Mechanic Association 13th triennial festival, 1st semi-centennial celebration.
  - Musical entertainment by Mr. Dempster.
- 1846
  - Haydn's The Creation, performed by the Handel and Haydn Society.
  - Hutchinson Family.
  - Concert by C. Sivori.
- 1848
  - Steyermarkische Musical Company.
- 1849
  - Madame Biscaccianti and Strakosch.
  - Services on the occasion of the decease of the late president, James K. Polk.
  - Sermon of the Spiritual Condition of Boston, preached by Theodore Parker.

=== 1850s ===
- 1850
  - Annetta Stephani.
  - Handel's Jeptha, with Boston Musical Education Society.
  - "Optical wonders. Whipple's grand exhibition of dissolving views! Magnifiying daguerreotypes, kaleidoscope pictures, & pyramic fires."
- 1852
  - "Professor Anderson, the wizard of the North"
  - Handel's Samson, with Handel and Haydn Society.
  - Donetti's Comic Troupe of Acting Monkeys
  - Germania Musical Society
- 1854
  - Magician Macallister.
  - "Splendid mirror of North and South America"; presented by J. Perham.
  - "Italia", panorama by Waugh.
- 1855
  - J. H. Siddons.
  - Josiah Perham's Ethiopian Troupe and Great Burlesque Company.
  - New England Anti-Slavery Convention.
  - William Makepeace Thackeray
- 1857
  - Lola Montez.
- 1858
  - The Bunyan Tableaux.
  - Orpheus Glee Club, Lucy A. Doane, Hugo Leonhard.
- 1859
  - Melodeon Minstrels.

=== 1860s ===
- 1860
  - Parlor operas, with Mr. & Mrs. Henri Drayton.
- 1862
  - French Zouaves.
  - Stereopticon.
  - M. Lizzie Bell, Agnes A. Kenney.
  - "Master Rentz's second annual subscription concert," with the Mendelssohn Quintette Club, Adeline S. Washburn.
  - Louis Moreau Gottschalk playing works by Chopin and Henselt.
- 1864
  - Arthur Cheney, H.C. Barnabee, John F. Pray.
  - Morton's The angel of the attic.
- 1865
  - A. Bronson Alcott
