= Washington Street (Boston) =

Street in Boston, Massachusetts

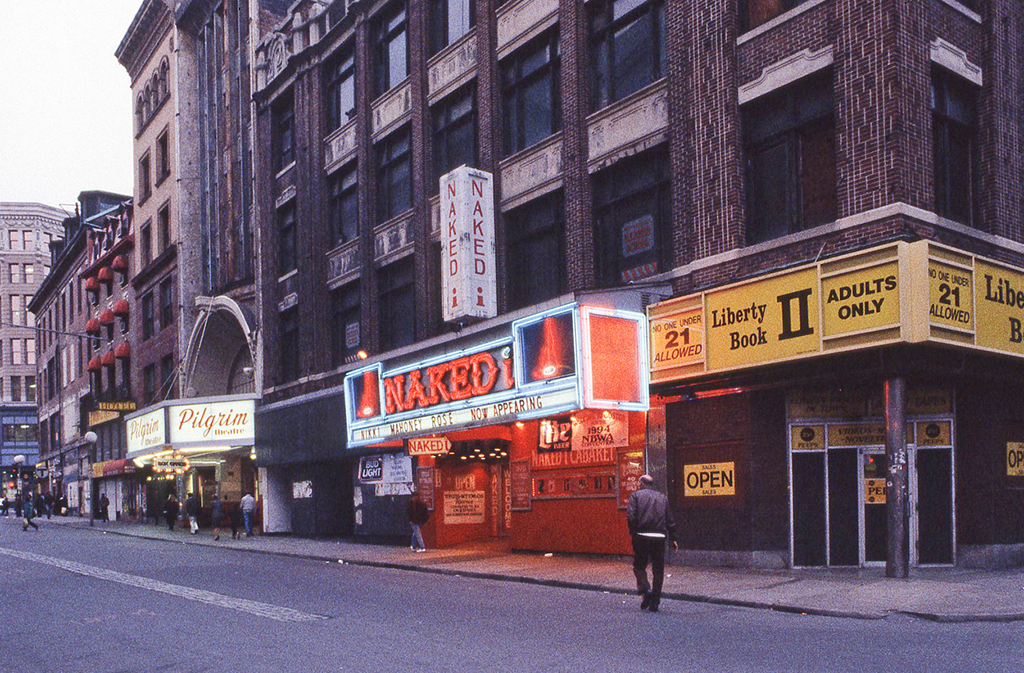
- Washington Street at Beach Street, looking north, c. 1970, the heart of the Combat Zone
- Interactive map of Washington Street
- Component highways: Route 1A from Walpole to Dedham
- South end: Neponset Street / Water Street in Walpole
- Major junctions: Route 27 in Walpole; Route 1A in Norwood; Route 1A in Dedham; I-90 in Boston
- North end: Court Street in Boston

Washington Street is a street originating in downtown Boston, Massachusetts, which extends southwestward to the Massachusetts–Rhode Island state line. The majority of its length outside of the city was built as the Norfolk and Bristol Turnpike in the early 19th century. It is the longest street in Boston and remains one of the longest streets in Massachusetts. Due to various municipal annexations with the city of Boston, the name Washington Street now exists six or more times within the jurisdiction(s) of the City of Boston.

Some intersecting streets have different names on either side of Washington Street.

== History ==
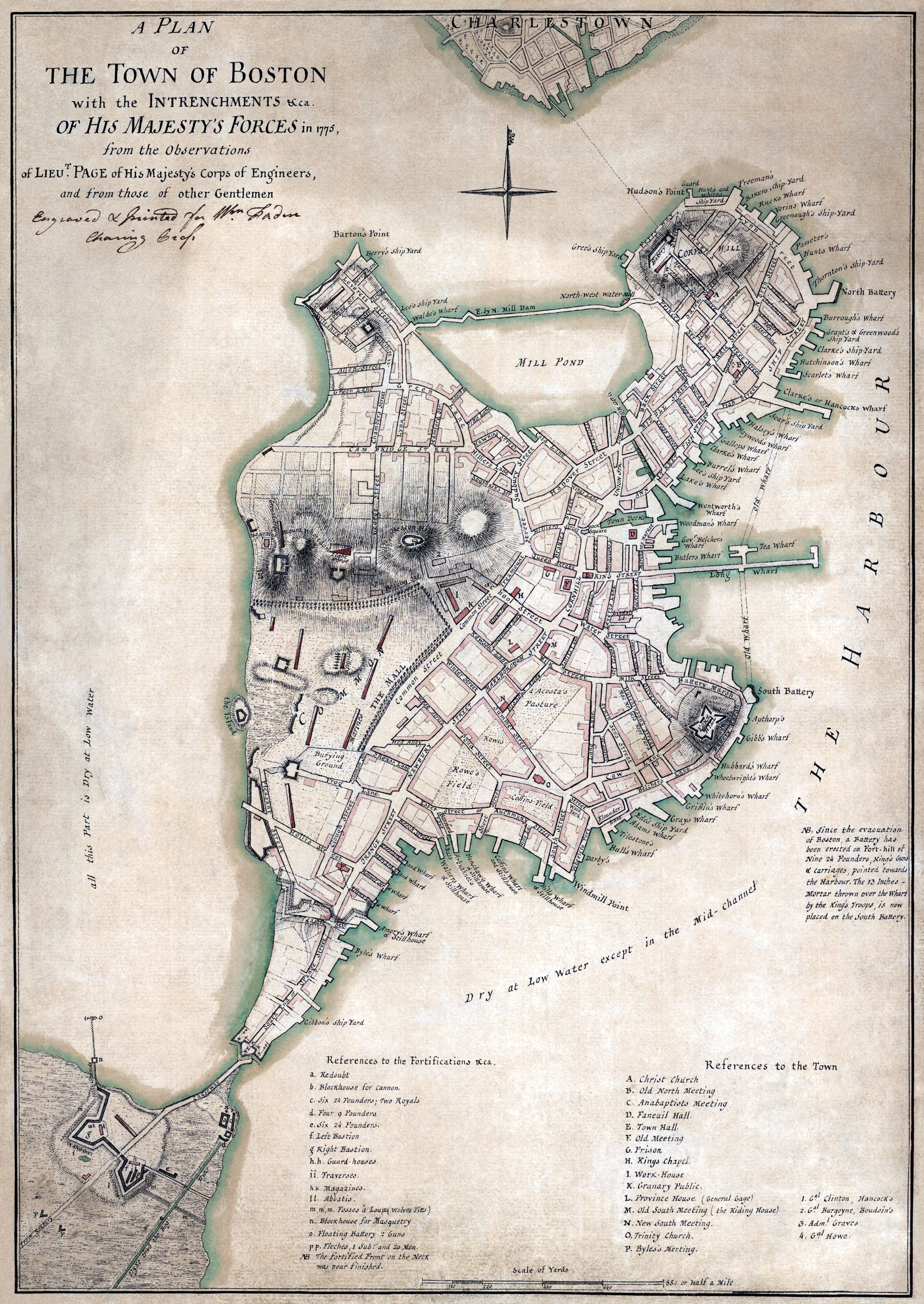
Orange Street, the original name for part of Washington Street, carried southbound traffic out of Boston, delivering it to the short causeway behind the fort on the mainland.

In 1789, the name "Washington Street" was given to the section of this road running from the border with Roxbury (then a separate town) to the fortification near the present-day East Berkeley Street MBTA station. This was done in honor of George Washington, who rode the Post Road into Boston during his tour of New England in October of that year.

Until 1803 and the commencement of large-scale infilling of Boston Harbor and Back Bay, the town lay at the end of a peninsula less than a hundred feet wide at its narrowest point. This was the waist of the strip of land known as Boston Neck. Originally a single street traversed the Neck, joining peninsular Boston to the mainland. This was termed Orange or South-End Street. The route served as the first leg of the Boston Post Road to New York City. Beginning in 1631, the narrowest waist of that isthmus was cut to make the town more defensible. To this end fortifications south of Boston were built to control the Post Road, both on the mainland and just beyond the man-made canal cutting through Boston Neck at what is now Back Bay (see map at right). These fortifications were gradually improved over the years, and considerably expanded by the British as the movement for colonial independence moved from widespread discontent to frank military revolution.

The name "Washington Street" was extended on July 6, 1824, to include the roads leading north to Dock Square. This consolidated and replaced other names that had been in use along this path since 1706:

- Orange Street, from the fortification to Essex Street/Boylston Street
- Newbury Street, from Essex Street/Boylston Street to Summer Street/Winter Street
- Marlborough Street, from Summer Street/Winter Street to School Street
- Cornhill, from School Street to Dock Square

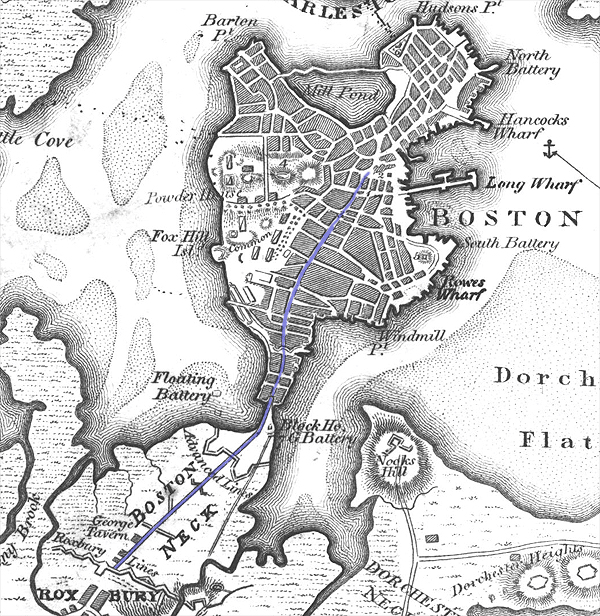
The future Washington St. shown in blue on a pre-Revolutionary British map of Boston.

Nine months later the name "Washington Street" was extended again. On May 9, 1825, the roads connecting Boston's town line to present-day Roxbury Street in Dudley Square were consolidated into Washington Street. This includes some of the oldest streets in Roxbury, some having been laid out in 1662.

For some time afterwards, Washington Street extended westward from Dudley Square to the border with Brookline. Part of this extension (from present-day Columbus Avenue to the Brookline border) was renamed Tremont Street on July 2, 1860. Then the remaining part from Dudley Square was renamed Roxbury Street on June 16, 1874—and at the same time, Washington Street was extended southwestward from Dudley Square along the Norfolk and Bristol Turnpike to Rhode Island. The only location where Washington Street deviated from the path of the turnpike was south of downtown Dedham, bypassing what is now School Street and Court Street.

In Boston, Washington Street was extended northward along a new road to Haymarket Square on November 6, 1872. (This extension was overtaken by the redevelopment of Haymarket Square and Scollay Square, which became Government Center.)

Charlestown Street, which began in Haymarket Square (where Washington Street ended) and continued northward to the Charlestown Bridge, was renamed North Washington Street on March 1, 1901. The name of the bridge itself was changed to North Washington Street on February 10, 1910.

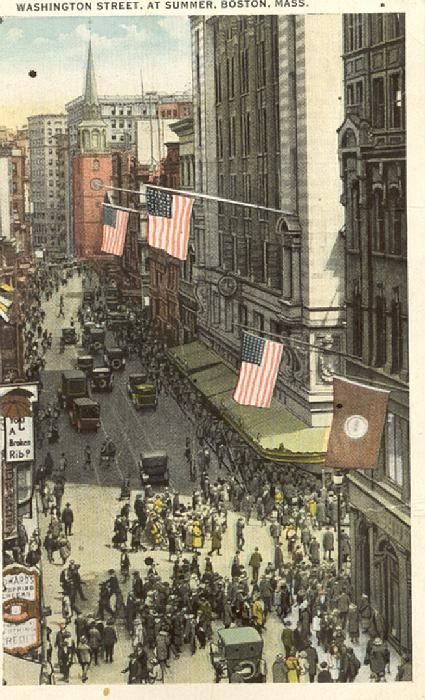
Washington St., early 20th century

The first state highway in Boston was the part of Washington Street from Dedham to West Roxbury Parkway (at Lagrange Street). It was taken over by the Massachusetts Department of Public Works in 1908. The short piece in West Roxbury Parkway, to just north of the road through the parkway, was taken over in 1921; the next state highway in Boston was the Southern Artery in 1926.

=== Norfolk and Bristol Turnpike ===
In 1802, Fisher Ames and a group of others requested that the Great and General Court lay out a new turnpike between the Norfolk County Courthouse and Pawtucket. They agreed (over the no vote of Dedham's representative, Ebenezer Fisher) and the road was charted on March 8, 1802. It was finished in 1806 at a cost of $225,000, or $6,440 a mile. It was the best and fastest highway in America at the time, allowing for mail to be delivered between Boston and Providence in under three hours.

It served as a straighter alternative to two roads between Boston and Providence: the Lower Boston Post Road (via Norwood and Foxborough), and the road via Walpole and Wrentham. The turnpike ran from Dudley Square to the border of Rhode Island and beyond to downtown Pawtucket. The turnpike was constructed as an entirely new road, except for a part through North Attleborough (which is the only part bypassed today by US 1). The southern half of the turnpike, which had some steep grades and bypassed towns where travelers wanted to stop, saw little use and remained a dirt road until the construction of US 1. The part of the turnpike within the Roxbury limits was laid out as a public road in June 1857 and named Shawmut Avenue, as an extension of the existing Shawmut Avenue from Boston. The adjacent part of the turnpike within West Roxbury was named Shawmut Avenue as well on February 3, 1858.

== Extent and description ==
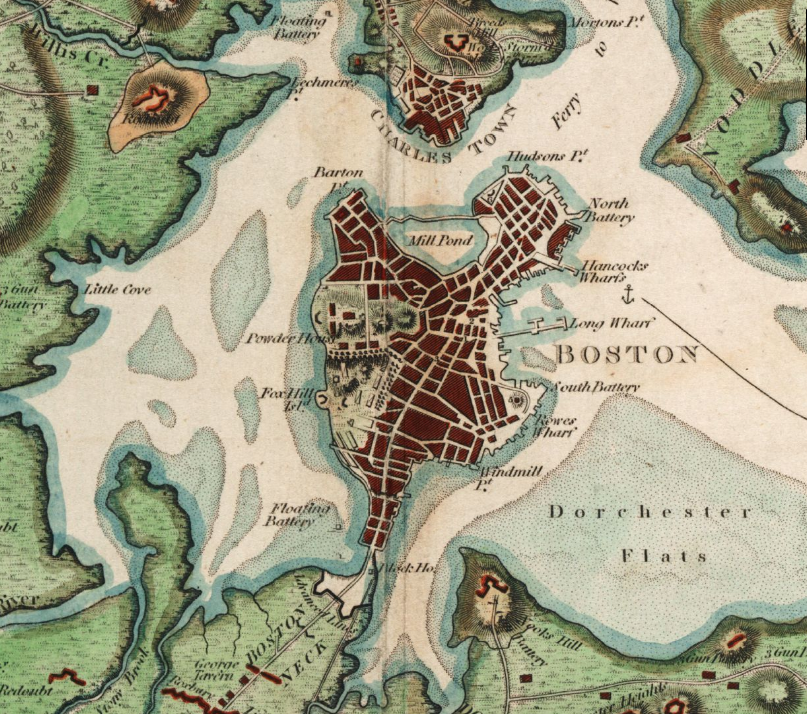
An 1806 map showing Washington Street—the earlier "Orange Street"—as the only road off the peninsula. The narrowest point was near today's crossing of the Massachusetts Turnpike.

Washington Street begins at State and Court Streets as a one-way thoroughfare (for northbound traffic only). Through Downtown Crossing, from Milk Street south to Temple Place, Washington Street is closed to most vehicular traffic (and continues to be one-way northbound for authorized traffic only). South of Temple Place, Washington is, once again, one-way northbound, becoming two-way at Stuart Street and Kneeland Street. From Marginal Road, south to Herald Street, the bridge over the Massachusetts Turnpike and the adjacent Amtrak/Massachusetts Bay Transit Authority (MBTA) commuter rail tracks, the road is also one-way northbound, with a southbound contra-flowing bus lane for the Silver-Line bus.

At Dudley Square in Roxbury, Washington Street is southbound-only for several blocks, between Warren Street and Dudley Street. Northbound traffic bypasses this section to the east using those two streets. Shortly after crossing Arborway in Jamaica Plain, Washington Street becomes Hyde Park Avenue, and traffic staying on Washington Street must turn west on Ukraine Way to cross over the Amtrak/MBTA Commuter Rail tracks, and then south on to Washington Street again.

Southbound traffic must use short sections of South Street and Poplar Street at Roslindale Square. South of there, near the border between Roslindale and West Roxbury, Washington Street crosses West Roxbury Parkway and acquires a median strip. This median lasts until just before the Dedham city line, where the road continues as an undivided road.

Washington Street continues southwestward, through the center of Dedham, the outskirts of Westwood, the centers of Norwood, and East Walpole and South Walpole. At the Walpole–Foxborough line, it no longer crosses the railroad tracks (the old Mansfield and Framingham Railroad), and traffic must detour via Water Street and North Street. North Street connects to the Boston-Providence Turnpike, which carries US Route 1 (and was never actually a turnpike, a toll road). This road merges into the old path of Washington Street south of the railroad. From there to Rhode Island, except through North Attleborough center (which it bypasses using East Washington Street as opposed to North and South Washington Streets), US Route 1 stays with Washington, as it passes through the outskirts of Foxborough (past Gillette Stadium), Wrentham and Plainville, and then through South Attleboro.

=== Numbered routes ===
Washington Street currently has the following route numbers:

- Route 1A from Elm Street in Dedham south to the split with Walpole Street in Norwood (except in northern Norwood, where 1A uses Upland Road)
- US Route 1 from northern Foxborough near Gillette Stadium to Rhode Island, except through North Attleborough center, where US 1 uses East Washington Street

When the first numbered highways in Massachusetts, the New England Interstate Highways, were assigned in 1922, NE 1 used Washington Street through North Attleborough center and from Norwood center to Arborway in Boston. By 1927, US 1 (as the road was now known) split in Dedham center onto Court Street, using Ames Street and Bridge Street into Boston, where it used Spring Street and Centre Street to reach Arborway.

Soon after 1933, the new road (Boston-Providence Turnpike and Brook Farm Parkway) from Roslindale to Foxborough was finished, and it was around this time that the rest of the current alignment to Rhode Island was finished — using Washington Street from Foxborough to the state line, except through North Attleborough center. The old road became Route 1A north from North Attleborough center and through South Attleboro, ending at the rotary just north of Dedham center. For several years in between, the new road was only built south of Dedham, and US 1 once again used Washington Street from Dedham into West Roxbury, where it cut north to Centre Street via West Roxbury Parkway.

Between 1949 and 1961, 1A was truncated to end at US 1 via Elm Street south of Dedham center, probably to keep traffic out of Dedham center. US 1 was removed from that alignment in 1989, but 1A still ends at the old route.

=== Public transportation ===
As a main road, Washington Street has had its share of streetcar and later bus routes. It also had the Washington Street Elevated from south of downtown to Dudley Square and later Forest Hills. An 1871 map shows horsecar tracks from Boylston Street south to Dudley Street. An 1874 map extends them south from Dudley to just north of Forest Hills, and north to Dock Square. By 1888, tracks also used Washington north to Haymarket Square, and by 1897 all the way to and over the Charlestown Bridge.

As the West End Street Railway electrified its lines in the late 19th century, Tremont Street was the first north-south arterial in downtown Boston to run electric streetcars. As the lines on Warren Street (December 28, 1889), Blue Hill Avenue (January 18, 1890), and Hampden Street (May 10, 1890) were electrified, they initially used Shawmut Avenue to reach Tremont Street. On September 2, 1890, the line on Washington Street to Forest Hills began electric operation, again using Shawmut Avenue north of Dudley Square. On November 28, 1891, the downtown Washington Street tracks were electrified, with the five Warren Street, Hampden Street, and Blue Hill Avenue routes rerouted to Washington Street. This relieved congestion on the Tremont Street tracks and allowed increases in service.

A later, 1899 map, shows that tracks owned by the West Roxbury and Roslindale Street Railway continued southwest from Forest Hills via Dedham to Norwood. The Norfolk Southern Street Railway left Norfolk on the road to Walpole center, but used Washington Street from Common Street in Walpole to South Walpole. Except for the older section through North Attleborough center, used by the Interstate Consolidated Street Railway, none of the rest had streetcar tracks, due to its avoidance of populated areas. In 1925, yet another map still shows streetcar tracks on Washington Street within Boston, ending downtown at Essex Street. By 1953 they were only in use from Forest Hills to Egleston (by the 40 route, bus substituted December 18, 1955) and from Dudley to Northampton Street (by the 47 route, bustituted September 13, 1953, and the 10 route, bus substituted December 5, 1953).

The Washington Street Elevated, later part of the Orange Line, opened from south of downtown Boston to Dudley on June 10, 1901, and south to Forest Hills November 22, 1909. The Washington Street Tunnel downtown opened November 30, 1908. The Elevated closed on April 30, 1987, with the opening of the Southwest Corridor several days later.

== Other Washington Streets in Boston ==
There are two significant and two minor streets in Boston with the same name. Addresses at these streets need to be distinguished by neighborhood names or ZIP codes.

- In the western part of Boston, Washington Street begins in Brookline Village, and crosses Brookline, Allston, Brighton, Newton, and Wellesley, ending at Wellesley's boundary with Natick, a total of almost 13.5 miles (21.7 km). It is the main east-west street in Brighton (ZIP Codes: 02135 in Brighton, 02458, 02460, 02462, 02465 and 02466 in Newton, 02445–02446 in Brookline, 02481–02482 in Wellesley) See Route 16.
- In the Dorchester neighborhood, Washington Street extends approximately 2.8 miles (4.5 km) from Blue Hill Avenue near Geneva Avenue to Dorchester Avenue at the southern boundary of the city (ZIP Codes: 02121 and 02124)
- In Hyde Park neighborhood, Washington Street extends approximately seven blocks in the small portion of Hyde Park on the east side of the Neponset River (ZIP Code: 02136).
- In Charlestown neighborhood, Washington Street begins at a dead end near the intersection of Austin Street and New Rutherford Avenue and extends three blocks to Harvard Street (ZIP Code: 02129)
- North Washington extends from the Haymarket neighborhood and proceeds northward where it crosses the Charles River and terminates in Charlestown at the junction with Chelsea Street.

== Image gallery ==
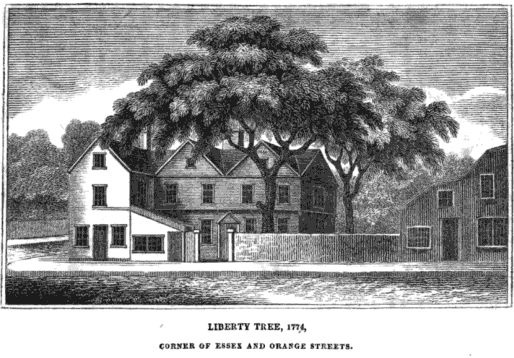
Liberty Tree, 1774

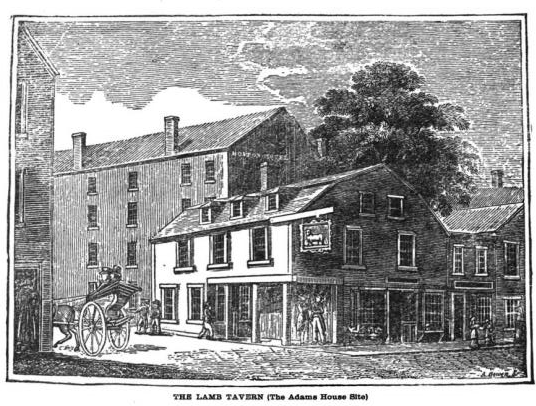
Lamb Tavern, 18th century

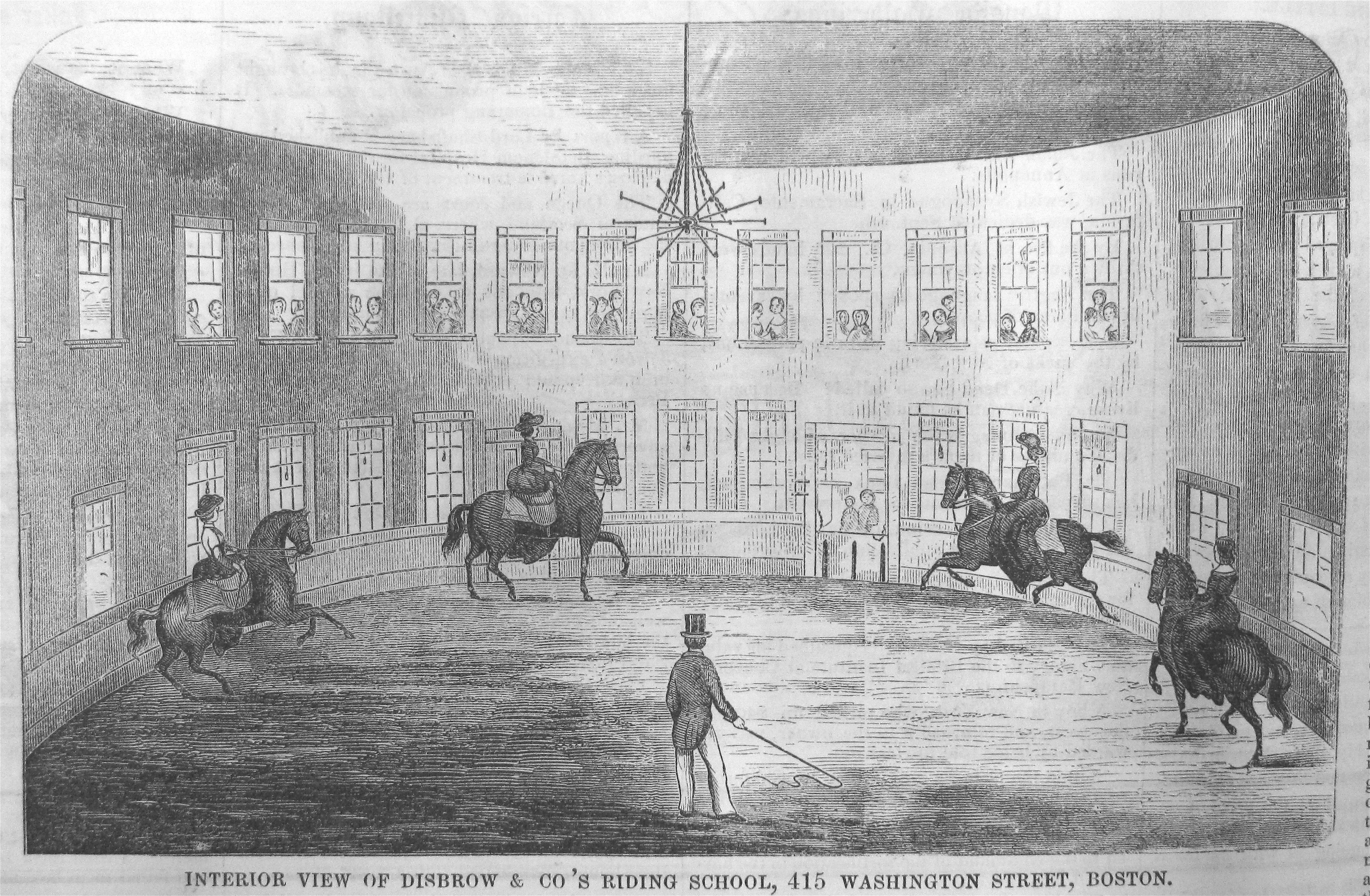
Disbrow's Riding School, Washington St., 1850s

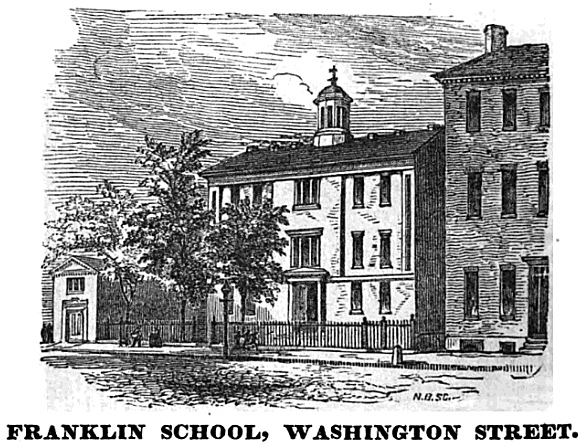
Franklin School, 1851

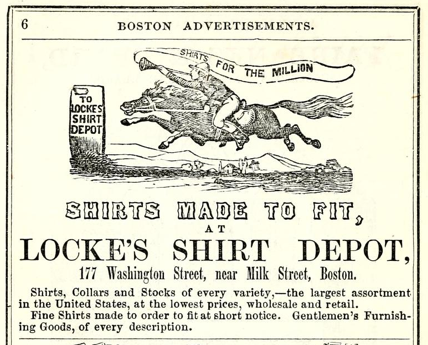
Locke's Shirt Depot, 1857

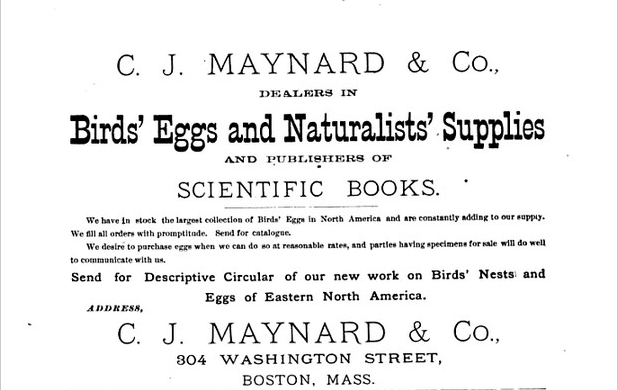
Advertisement for C.J. Maynard & Co., natural history supplies, 1882

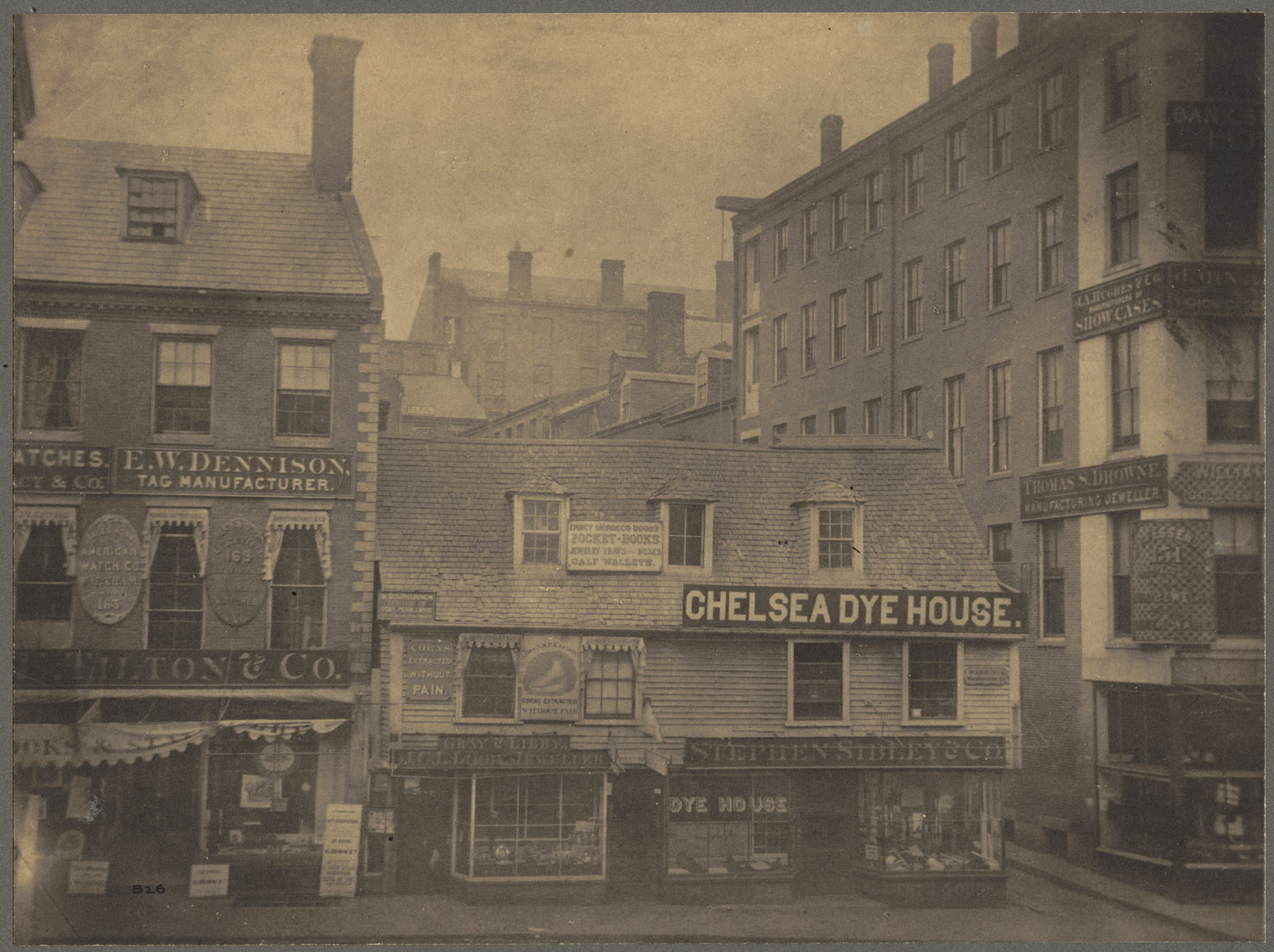
Hewes house, 1860

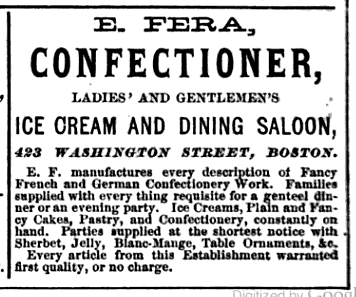
Advertisement for Fera's Ice Cream & Dining Saloon, 1868

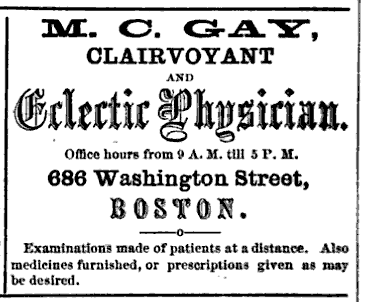
M.C. Gay, Clairvoyant and Ecelectic Physician, 1868

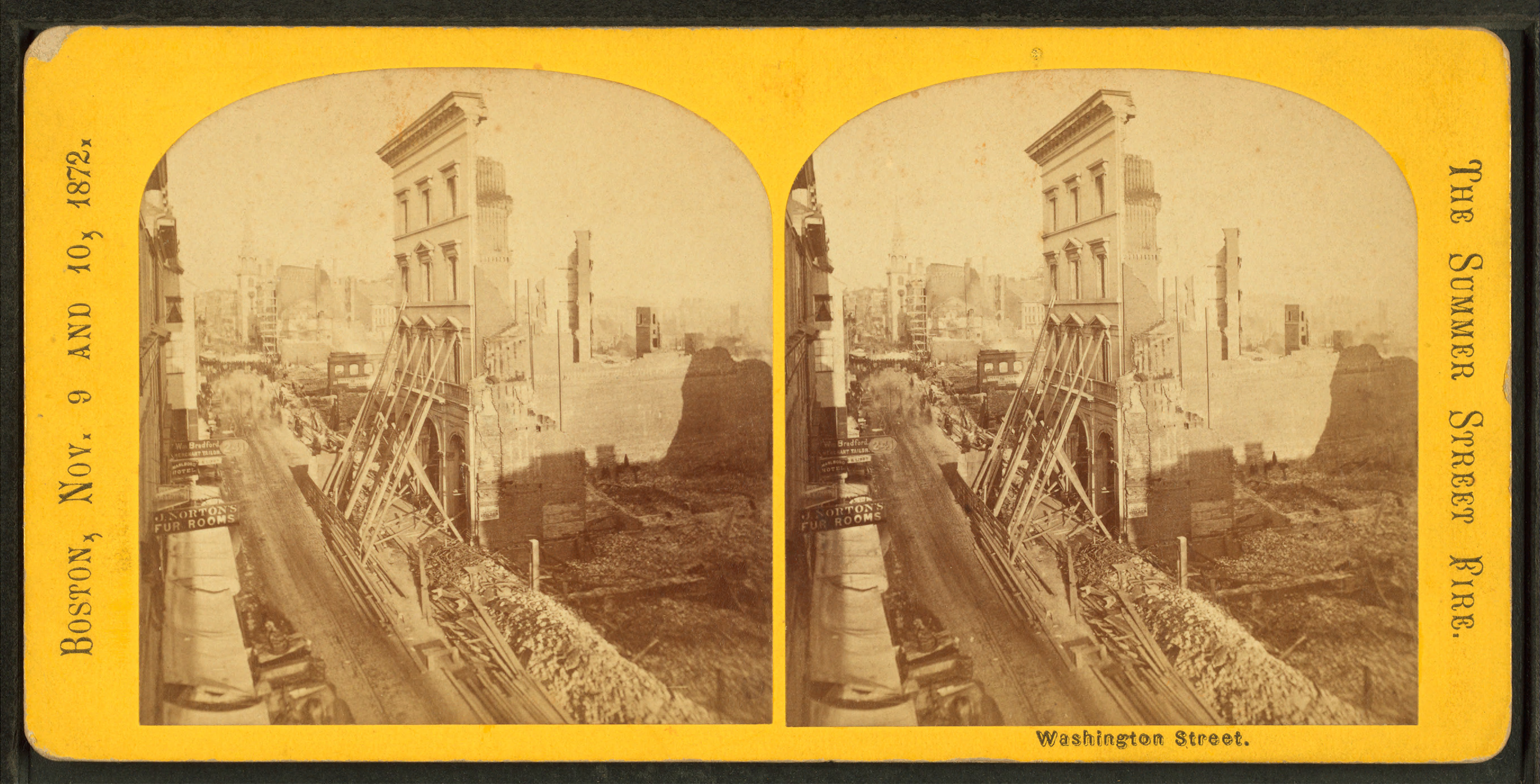
After fire of 1872

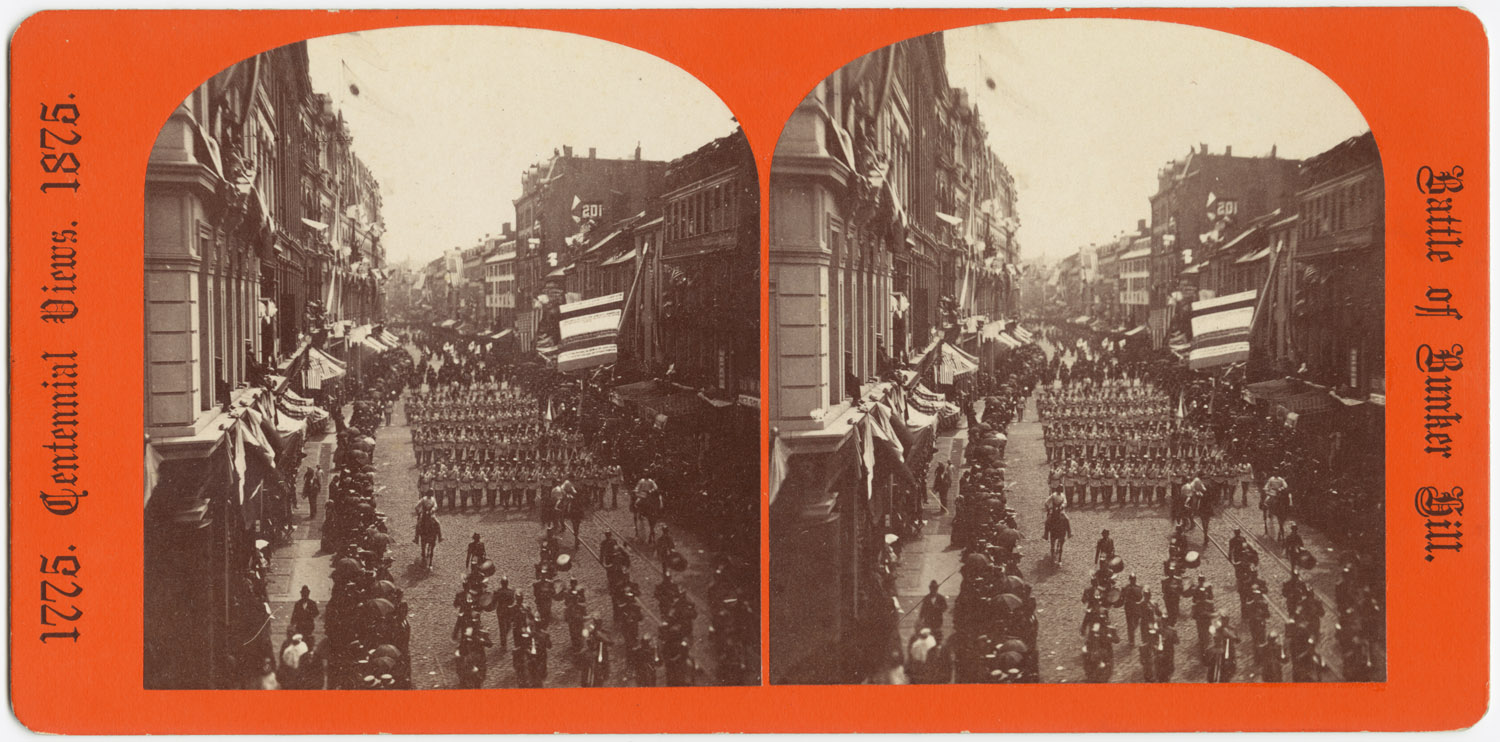
1875

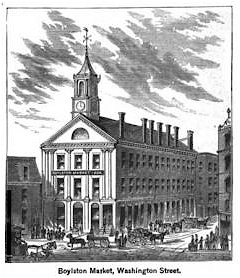
Boylston Market, 19th century

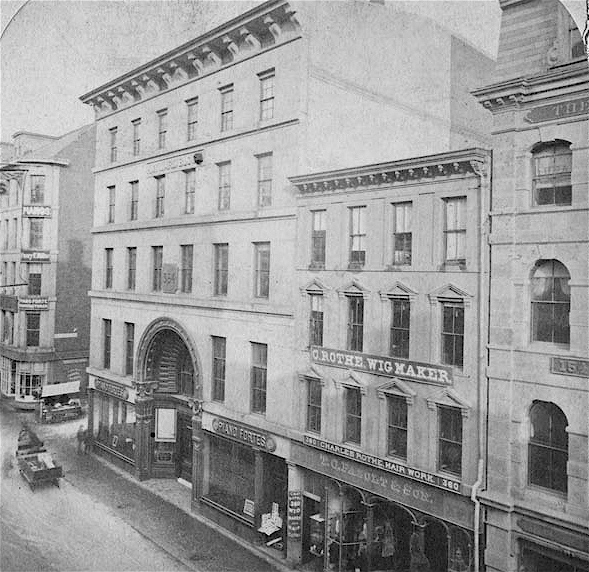
Washington St., 19th century

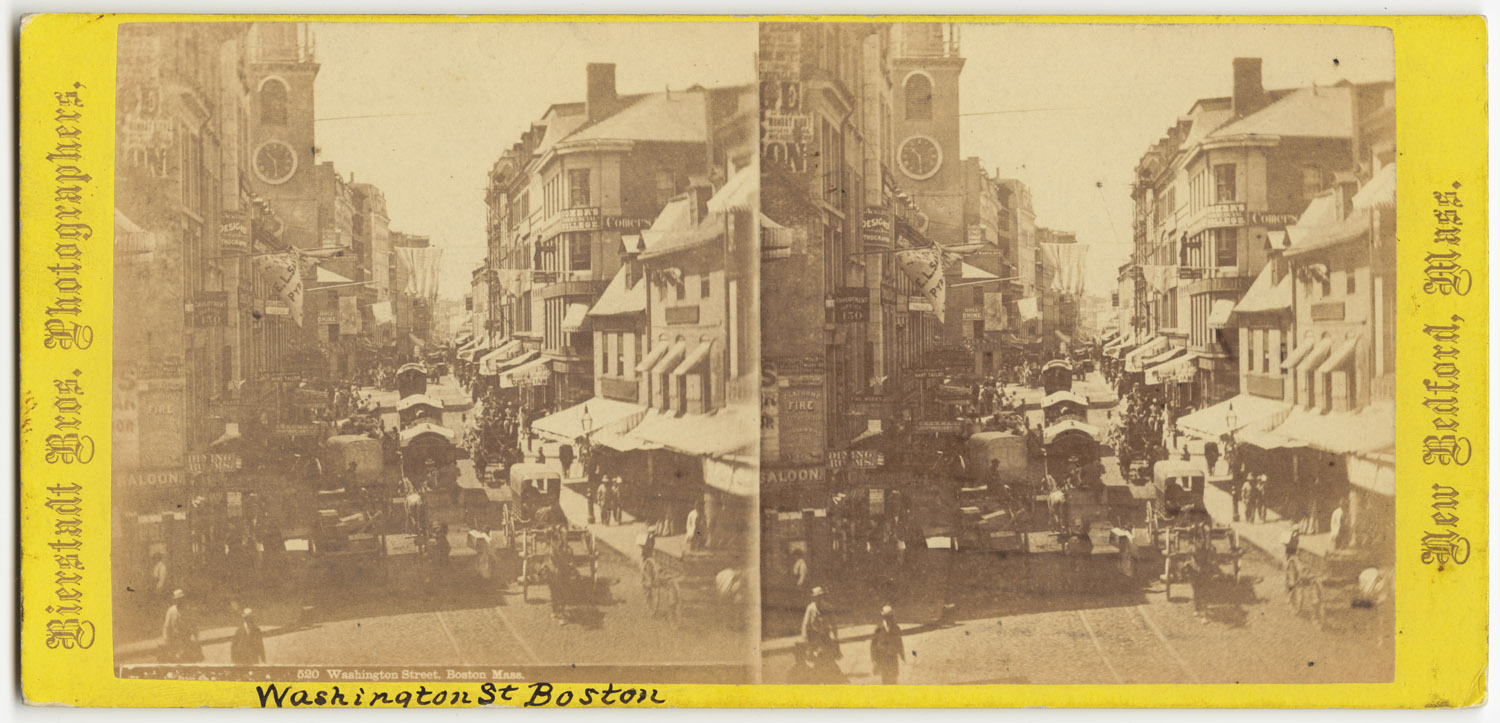
19th century

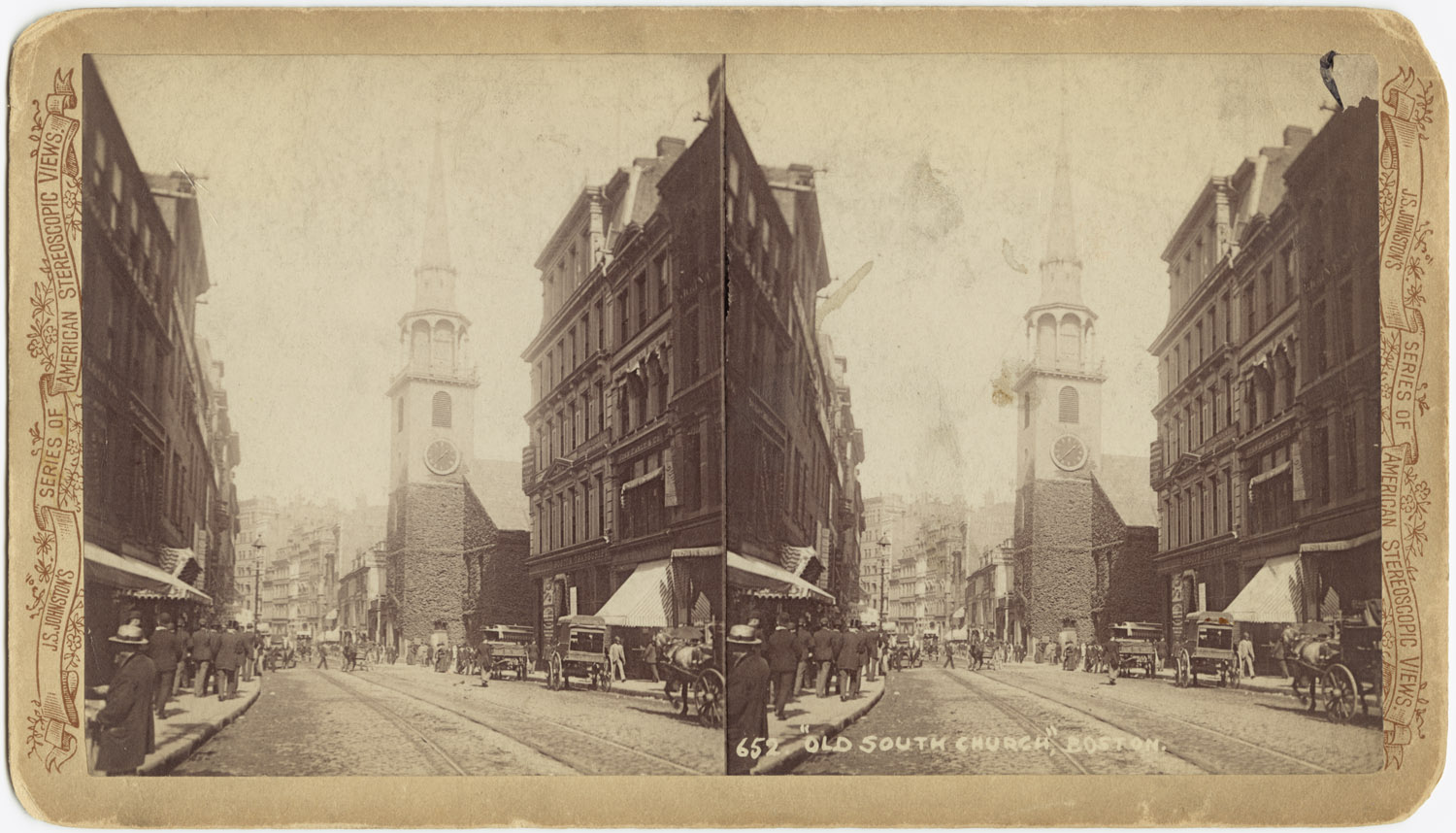
19th century

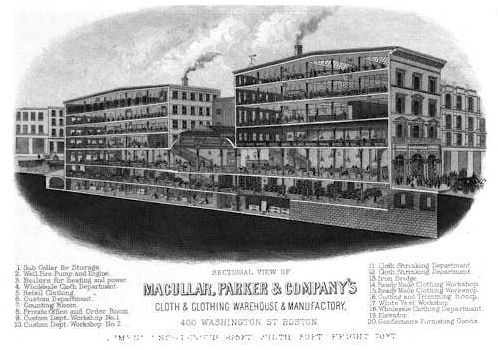
Macullar, Parker & Co., 1881

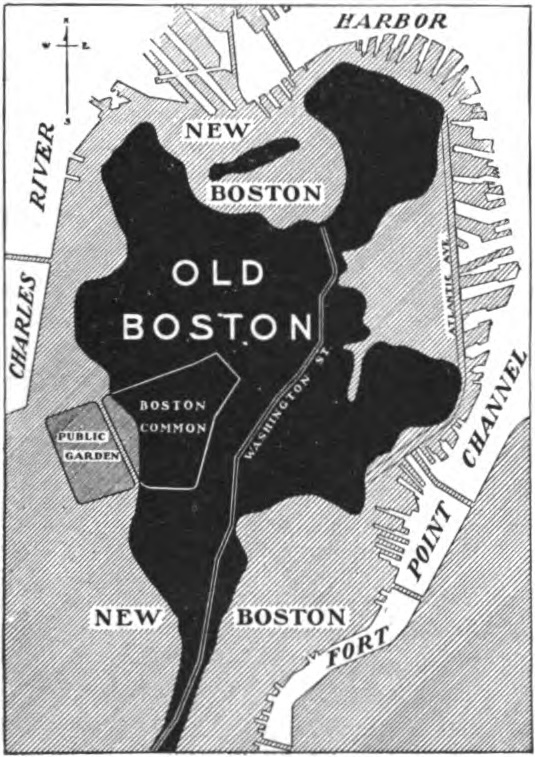
Washington St. As prominent fixture in Old Boston map

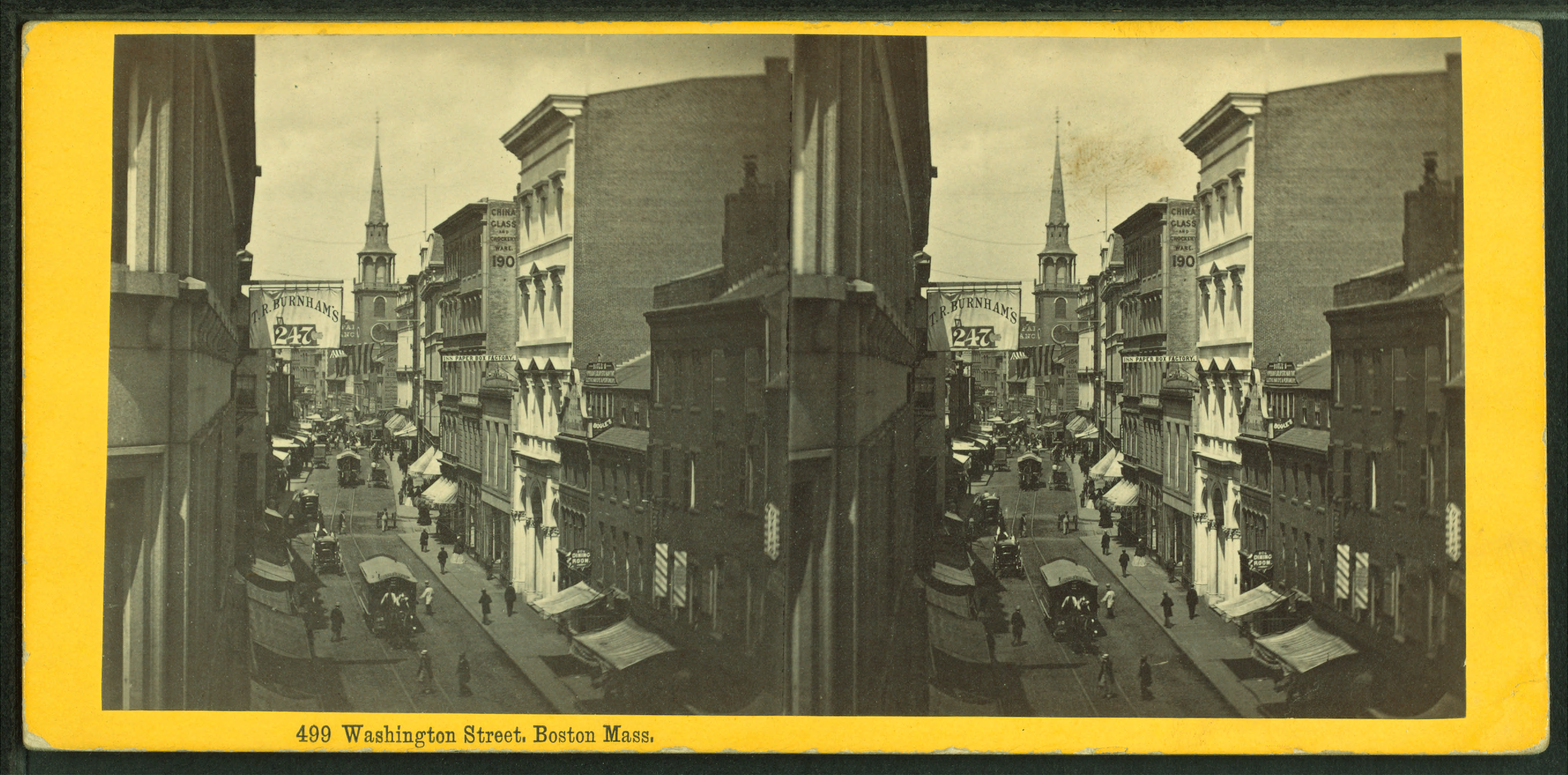
Stereoscopic image by the Bierstadt Brothers

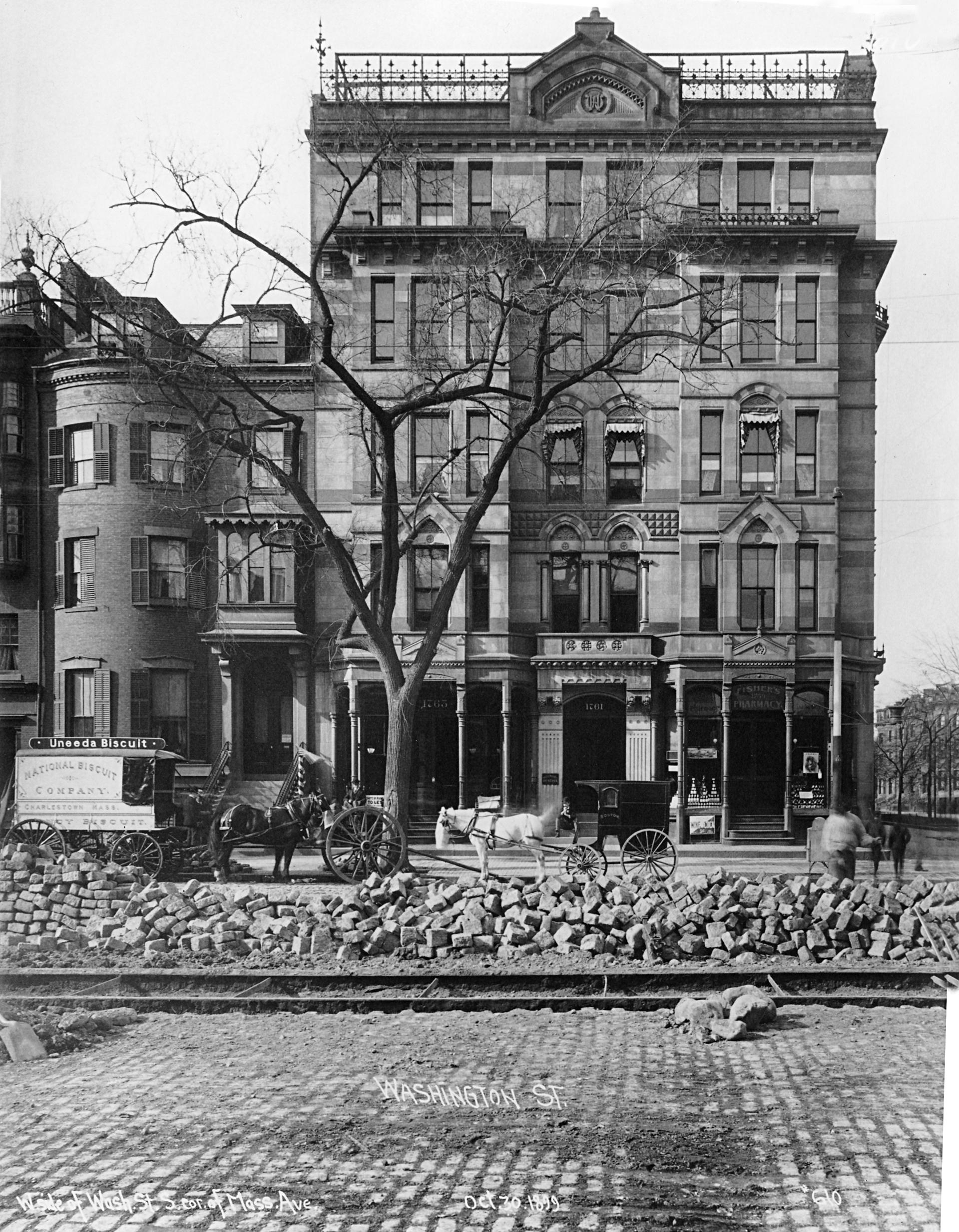
Alexandra Hotel in South end, Washington St. and Mass Ave. Taken in October, 1899.

A parade on Washington Street, Norwood, c. 1920. Looking north towards Norwood Common (on right in distance)

== See also ==
- Boston-area streetcar lines
- Downtown Crossing
- Modern Theatre
- Old Corner Bookstore
- Old South Meeting House
- Pi Alley
- SoWa

Former tenants

- Amory Hall, 19th century
- Arcadia Hotel, burned in 1913 killing 28 people
- Beethoven Hall, 1870s
- Bijou Theatre
- Black, J. W. photography studio (c. 1860s+)
- Boston Female Asylum
- Boylston Market
- T.R. Burnham, photographer, 19th century
- Chinese Museum, 19th century
- Columbia Theatre (1891 – c. 1957)
- Fetridge & Co., periodical depot, 19th century
- Globe Theatre (1871)
- Globe Theatre (1903)
- Gordon's Olympia Theatre, 20th century
- Grand Opera House
- A.N. Hardy, photographer, 19th century
- Haytian Bureau of Emigration
- Keith-Albee Boston Theatre (1920s)
- Keith's Theatre (1894–1928)
- S.S. Kilburn, engraver, 19th century
- Lafayette Place Mall
- Liberty Tree
- Melodeon, 19th century
- Park Theatre
- RKO-Boston movie theater (1930s–1950s)
- RKO-Keith's Memorial movie theater (1928–1960s)
- Selwyn's Theatre, 19th century
- South Congregational Church
- Theatre Comique
- White, Smith & Company, music publishers, 19th century
- Whipple's photo studio, 19th century
- White Horse Tavern
