= Boston Aquarial and Zoological Gardens =

Public exhibit in Boston, Massachusetts

- Date opened: October 1860
- Date closed: June 1862
- Location: Boston, Massachusetts, USA

The Boston Aquarial and Zoological Gardens (October 1860 – June 1862) in Boston, Massachusetts, featured a public aquarium and zoo. It was located in the Financial District on Central Court (off Washington Street). On display were "hundreds of specimens of the finny tribe there to be seen sporting in their native element, in all their variety of hue and shape" as well as other animals. James Ambrose Cutting and Henry D. Butler ran the business, derived from an earlier incarnation known as the Boston Aquarial Gardens. P.T. Barnum bought it in 1862, renovated it, and reopened it as Barnum's Aquarial Gardens.

== History ==
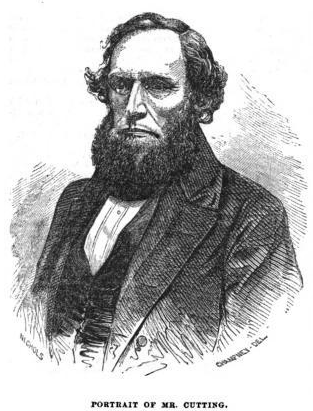
J.A. Cutting, proprietor, 1862

"The gardens were officially opened to the public on October 5th, 1860. The zoological department had added a moose, a leopard, an African python, and several seals. The prices remained fixed at 25 cents for adults and ten cents for children. In February 1861, a newly discovered species of sea anemone, Trochartea pendula, was presented. ... By that time, the Aquarial department had grown to include a collection of eels, trout, haddock, shrimp and dogfish. ... Downstairs in the zoological department, an alligator shared a cage with a snapping turtle, a box turtle, and an African ibis. There was also a pair of lions, a leopard, a grizzly bear, black bears, assorted monkeys and parrots, an albino flying squirrel, deer, owls, and foxes. The 'den of serpents' included an anaconda, pythons, a pine snake and a black snake." In 1861, "the Zoological Department [was] under the charge of Uriah Sears who ... trained the bears, the kangaroos, the moose and the baboon to perform wonderful feats in the ring."

=== Whale ===
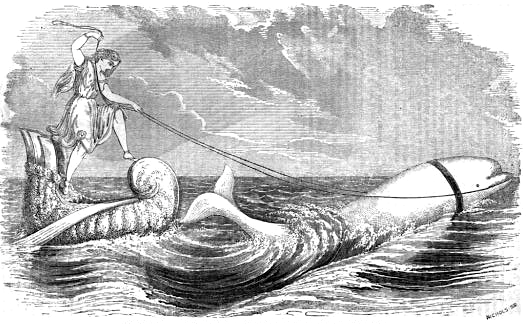
"Mademoiselle Leone driving the whale, at the Aquarial Gardens," Boston, 1862

The proprietors added a live beluga whale, collected from the Gulf of St. Lawrence, to the collection in 1861. It was the first cetacean ever kept in captivity in the modern world.

"The present whale, now an active swimming resident of our city, was caught in the St. Lawrence River, Upper Canada, between the Orelle and DuLoup rivers. His capture was secured by weirs, a sort of trap made of wooden stakes, inclosing an area of several miles of water, but so shaped as to concenter to a point where big fish are nabbed. ... Having been secured he was placed in a huge box for transportation. Before this was accomplished however, the whale gave its captors very much trouble by his powerful flappings, jumpings &c. &c., having floundered some Frenchmen several times, much to their peril and inconvenience. The box was lined with sea-weed, and was partially covered at the top with slats. The precious freight was then carried 7 miles over one of the roughest roads in Canada, and from thence by rail 500 miles to Boston, by special trains. ... At each station the monster was well watered, as if he had been a locomotive. The aqueous attentions were quite necessary during the journey of 60 hours. All along the route the distinguished traveller was the object of great curiosity, and the most animated conversation. On being placed in the huge tank at the Aquarial Gardens, the process of which was witnessed by hundreds with the most intense interest, the whale at once swam in the most lively and graceful manner!"

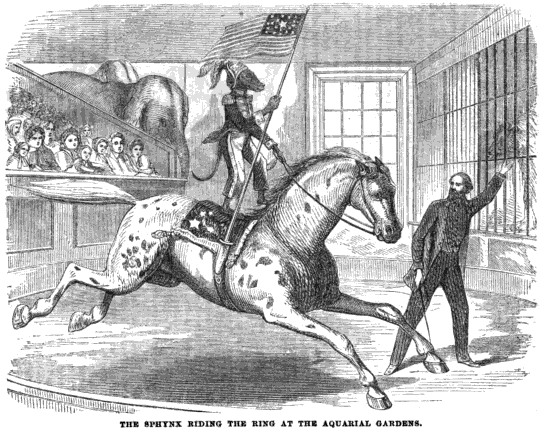
"The sphinx riding the ring at the Aquarial Gardens," 1862

This beluga was trained and performed shows at the Aquarial Gardens, until it died in 1863. P.T. Barnum, who by this point owned the facility and had renamed it to Barnum's Aquarial Gardens, presented the deceased beluga to the Boston Society of Natural History upon its death, and by 1869, the skeleton had been transferred to the Museum of Comparative Zoology at Harvard University.

=== Sphinx ===
Visitors could also see a so-called "sphinx." "We well remember [the sphynx] when it first arrived at the Gardens -- a dull, obstinate, seemingly unteachable brute. Now, however, he is one of the great cards of the institution. Nothing can be more amusing than his equestrian feats, whether he appears as a volunteer, flag in hand or as a fast young man on an hired horse. Then his other performances in the ring are infinitely grotesque. He wheels a barrow, personifies laziness to the life, feigns insensibility, carries a heavy log, mounts a pole, and travels around the ring on the hand rail."

=== P.T. Barnum ===
In 1862 P.T. Barnum "bought the establishment and closed it for extensive renovations. When it reopened as Barnum's Aquarial Gardens he announced that the Gardens would be associated with the American Museum in New York and that he hoped 'to form such a happy blending of amusement with instruction so as not to depend solely upon the scientific public for support, but to render this establishment attractive and popular with all respectable classes.' James Cutting was then engaged to remain at the Gardens and take charge of the living whale, the seals, and other rare animals."

== Events ==
- 1860
  - October - "Five 'live Africans' just from their native shores, in their home dresses, and their home habits" ("a Hottentot, Bushman, Fingo, Zulu and Kaffir")
  - December - "A new species of Actennia is now to be seen at the ... Gardens. It was dredged in about 50 fathoms of water, a few miles from Cape Ann and brought to this city by the fishermen. It is attached to a mollusk -- of the species Tritonium decemcostatium -- to which it is supposed to fasten itself for the purpose of being carried from place to place. Professor Agassiz ... declared it to be an entirely new species."
  - December - "Mademoiselle Victoria, Queen of the Wizards, from Paris"
- 1861
  - January - "Professor Harrington, the Boston favorite, will exhibit his wonderful skill in ventriloquism and other marvels"
  - March - "The Robbers of Bagdad, or the Fairy Police" ("written expressly for this establishment ... produced under the direction of Mr. C.H. Wilson.") "After the dramatic performance, the Arabian horse Abdallah, the sphinx, the educated bear, the moose and the kangaroos will go through their various performances in the ring. The seals Ned and Fanny, as usual."
  - April - "An Hour in Olympus, or, a Glance at the Gods" (premier of "a grand scenic, musical, mythological, mimical, pantomimical and unprecedentedly extravagent olia podrida")
  - "In an immense glass tank, a living white or Beluga whale. It measures 12 feet in length, and weighs 2,000 pounds. It was brought from the Gulf of St. Lawrence, and is the only one ever taken alive."

== See also ==
- Barnum's Aquarial Gardens (1862–1863), of P.T. Barnum
