= Howard Gould =

Howard Gould may refer to:

- Howard Gould (actor) (1863–1938), American actor
- Howard Gould (financier) (1871–1959), American financier and the son of Jay Gould
- Howard Michael Gould (born 1962), American novelist, television writer-producer, screenwriter, director, and playwright
