= Boston Aquarial Gardens =

Coordinates: 42.357°N 71.060°W

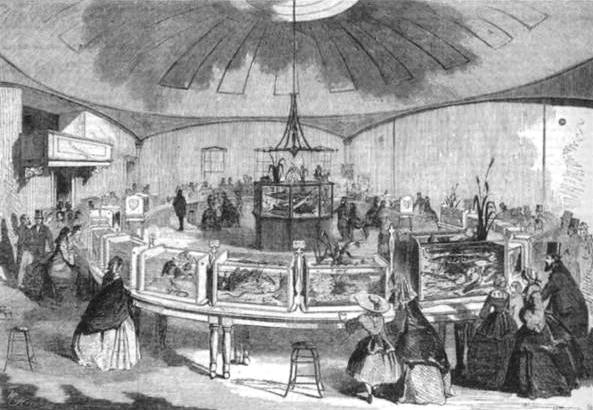
- Boston Aquarial Gardens, Bromfield Street, 1859
- Interactive map of Boston Aquarial Gardens
- Date opened: 1859
- Date closed: 1860
- Location: Bromfield Street, Financial District, Boston

The Boston Aquarial Gardens (1859-1860) was a public aquarium in Boston, Massachusetts, established by James Ambrose Cutting and Henry D Butler. The "conservatories [were] filled with rare marine animals imported and collected exclusively for this establishment; ... a perfect and striking illustration of life beneath the waters." The business was located on Bromfield Street in the Financial District.

In 1860 it moved to a new facility nearby, on Central Court, off Washington Street, and re-opened as the Boston Aquarial and Zoological Gardens.

== Image gallery ==
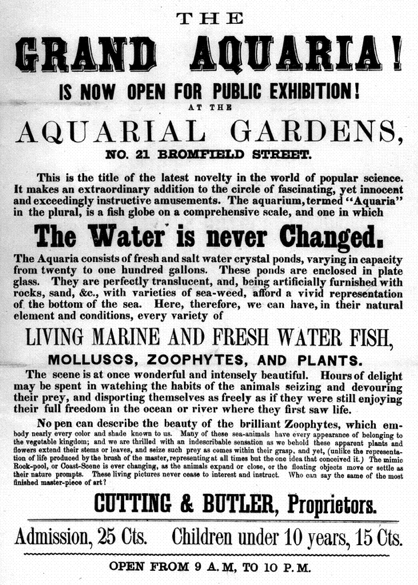
Advertisement, 1859

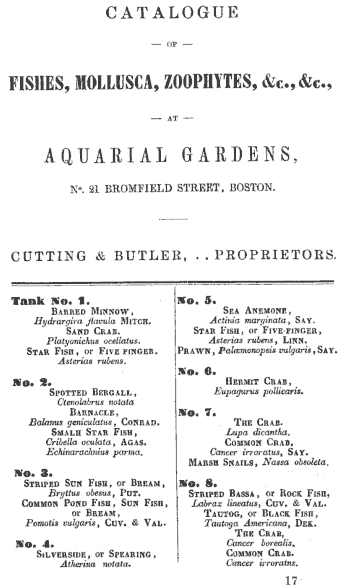
"Catalogue of fishes, mollusca, zoophytes, &c. ... Cutting & Butler, proprietors," 1859

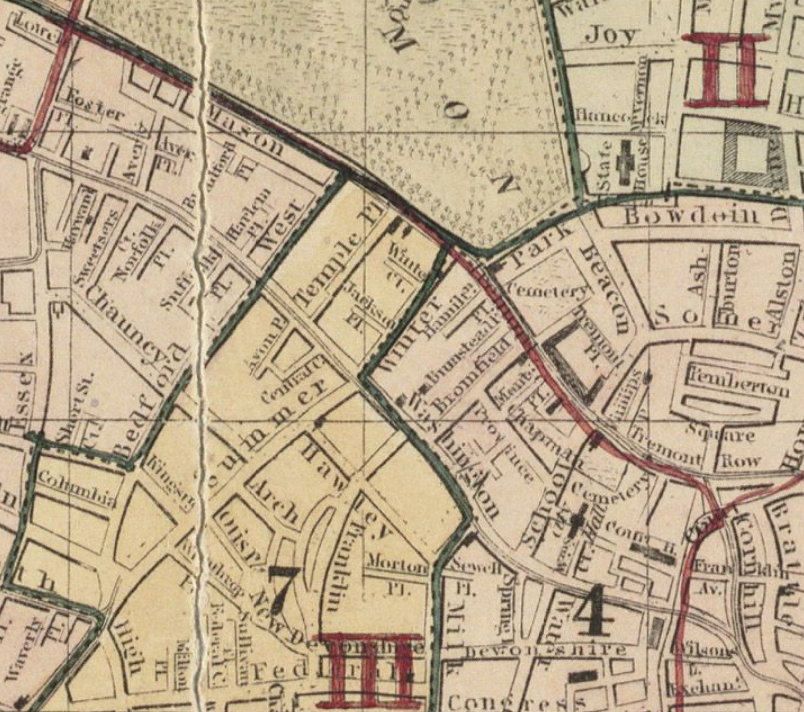
Detail of map of Boston, showing Bromfield Street, early 1860s

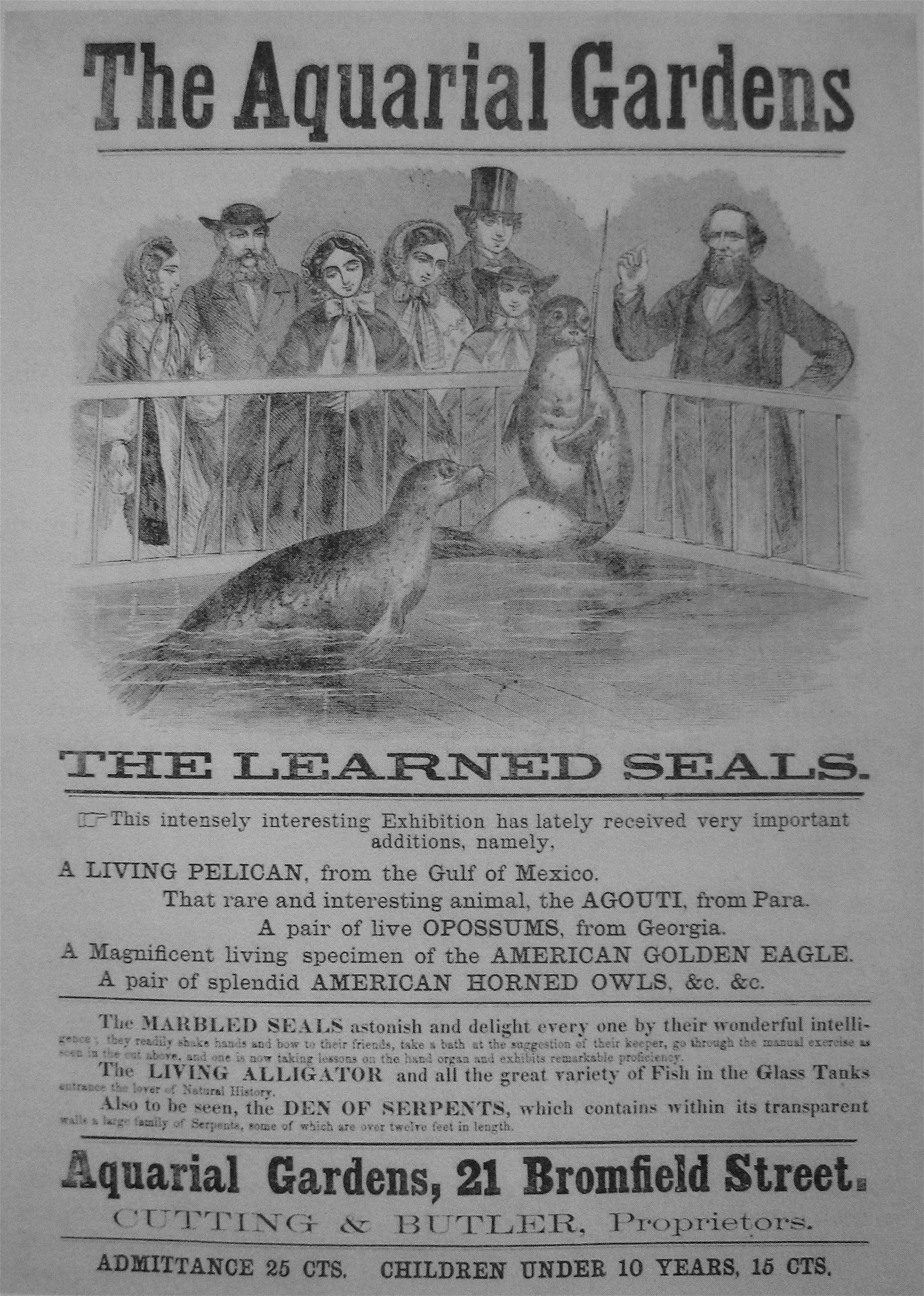
Advertisement for "the learned seals," 1860
