= Stephen Deblois =

American musician (1699 - 1778)

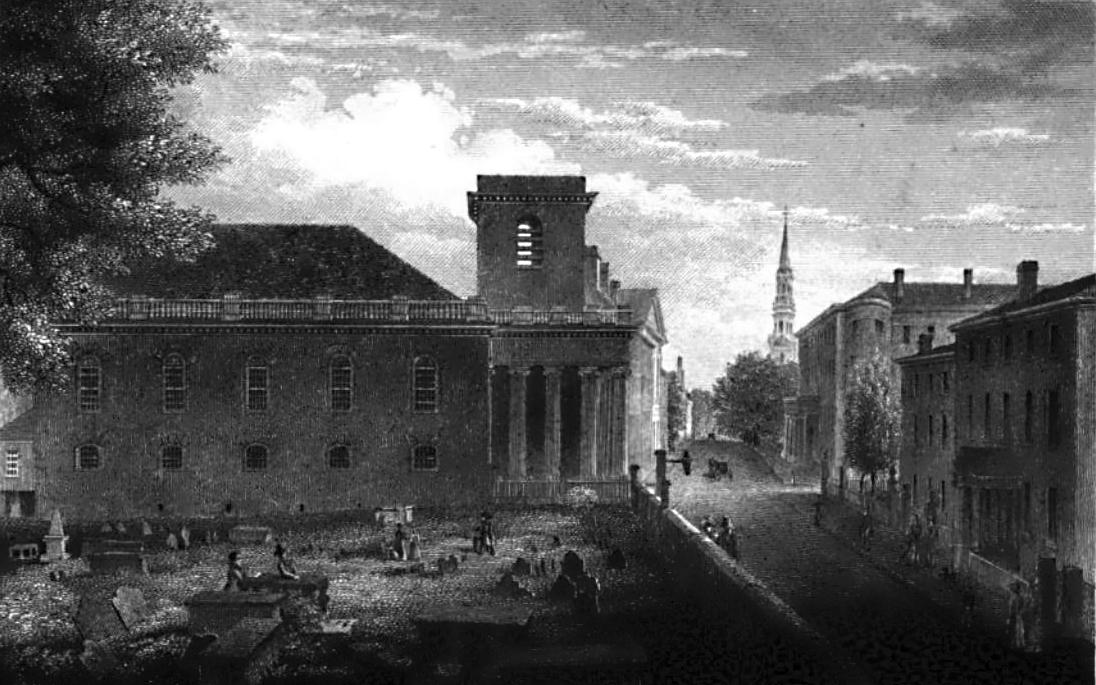
King's Chapel, Boston

Stephen Deblois (1699–1778) was a musician who lived in New York and Boston, Massachusetts in the 18th century. He played the organ for King's Chapel and Old North Church in Boston, and owned Boston's Concert Hall.

== Biography ==
Stephen Deblois (also De Blois or Dublois) was born in Oxford, England, on July 24, 1699, to Louis Du Blois. In 1720 he moved from England to New York with his friend William Burnet, who commenced his service as colonial governor of New York and New Jersey.

In 1721, Deblois married Ann Furley (d. 1762). They had three children: Sarah Deblois Wallis (b. 1723), Gilbert Deblois (1725-1791), and Lewis Deblois (b. 1727).

Deblois moved from New York to Boston in 1728 "with Governor Burnet," when the latter became colonial governor of Massachusetts. In Boston, Deblois served as organist of King's Chapel (1733-ca. 1748) and Old North Church.

In addition to performing, he also organized musical concerts at several venues, including Faneuil Hall and Concert-Hall. In 1754 he bought Concert Hall, at Hanover Street and Queen Street, from his sons Gilbert and Lewis, who kept a brass-making shop there. In 1769, Stephen Deblois sold the Concert Hall to William Turner.

Stephen and his wife Ann "are probably buried under King's Chapel in the De Blois tomb (tomb No.11)."
