= Joseph Stevens Jones =

American dramatist (1809–1877)

Joseph Stevens Jones (September 28, 1809 – December 29, 1877) was an American actor, playwright, theater manager, and surgeon. He wrote at least 150 plays that were mostly produced at theaters in Boston, Massachusetts.

== Early life and education ==
Jones was born in Boston, Massachusetts on September 28, 1809. He was the son of Mary Ann (née Stevens) and Abraham A. Jones, a sea captain who worked for the Russian American Company in Alaska. His father died in 1819 in Unalaska, leaving Jones and his four siblings to be raised by his mother in Boston.

He attended public elementary schools in Boston. He left school to work in a cordage store. Next, he worked in the counting room of a bank. When his boss at the bank learned of his interest in writing plays, he contacted a theater manager and helped Jones secure a job at the theater.

While working in theaters, he also attended medical school. In 1843 he graduated from Harvard Medical School.

== Career ==
=== Theater ===
Jones debuted as an actor at the age of eighteen in the role of Crack a production of the comedy The Turnpike Gate in Providence Rhode Island. He was then engaged by the Tremont Theatre in Boston, performing in mostly dramas. One of his early big roles were as Lucullus in Damon and Pythias. However, he was better at comedy and soon was cast in roels in Perfection, The Young Widow, and Lionel Lincoln.Lionel Lincoln.

He was later hired as a comedic actor by the Warren Theatre and eventually became its stage manager. His first successful play was The Liberty Tree or, Boston Boys in '76 which was produced at the Warren Theatre in Boston in 1832. It celebrated the fiftieth anniversary of the end of the Revolutionary War. Jones played the Yankee character Bill Ball. Jones also worked for the National Theatre in Boston, where he worked as a stage manager, financial advisor, and playwright.

In 1839, he leased the Tremont Theatre for four years for $8,000 a year ($241,875 in today's money). He opened the theater on September 2, 1839, with a production of The Poor Gentlemen. However, the 1839 to 1840 theater season was bad for theaters across the country, and the Tremont was not profitable. Jones ran the theater from 1840 to 1841 with stars Tyrone Power, Fanny Elssler, and Dan Power. However, he closed when the season ended for financial reasons. Except for rare performances in New York and Philadelphia, he retired from acting when he closed the Tremont; his last performance in Boston was as Mock Duke in The Honeymoon at the Tremont.

Jones was a prolific author, writing about 150 plays. His heyday as a playwright was between 1835 and 1875. He is mostly known for his historical dramas but also wrote comedies, farces, melodramas, and adaptations of novels. His best-known play is Solon Shingle; or, The People's Lawyer, the story of the trial of Charles Otis, a poor clerk framed by a coworker for stealing. The play was first produced at the National Theatre in Boston in 1839. The play's popularity rests on the character of Solon Shingle, played by John E. Owens. Owens was a great success in the role, making his final performance as Shingle in New York in 1884.

His The Carpenter of Rouen; or, A Revenge for the Massacre of St. Bartholomew was produced across the United States and in England. Other popular plays by Jones were Moll Pitcher, Paul Revere and the Sons of Liberty, The Silver Spoon, and The Sons of the Cape.The Silver Spoon; or, Our Own Folks was first produced at the Boston Museum on February 16, 1852. William Warren was noted for performing the role of Jefferson Scattering Batkins through 1883. Its popularity led to Jones becoming the unofficial dramatist of the Boston Museum. The play was revived at that theater through many seasons and reprinted in 1911.

He supported copyright protection and adequate compensation for authors. Jones points to the weakness of the copyright laws, that several of his plays have been performed throughout the States without remuneration to himself. He also notes that his plays were meant to be performed, not read.

He was a member of the Howard Athenaeum Stock Company for many years and was connected with the stage for 52 years.

=== Medicine ===
After he tired of acting, Jones completed his medical studies at Harvard. After graduating from medical school, he practiced medicine in Boston's West End for 35 years. He was the city physician for several years during the administrations of Mayor Wightman and Mayor Lincoln. Jones also lectured on anatomy and physiology at the Tremont Temple. Jones was also a member of the Mechanic Light Infantry and was connected for many years with the old First Regiment as a surgeon.

== Personal life ==
Jones married Hannah Canterbury Dexter (1812–1870). They had four children, including Joseph S. Jones Jr., Alice L. Jones, Dr. William Jones, and Nathaniel Dexter Jones, an actor and theater manager. After her death, he married her sister, Louisa Goward Dexter (1814–1890). His home was on the corner of Bowdoin Street and Cambridge Street in Boston.

He was a Freemason and a member of the Odd Fellows, playing a large role in the construction of the Odd Fellows Building in Boston.

After being ill for a year, Jones died on December 29, 1877, from pneumonia at his residence in Boston, Massachusetts. His funeral service was held at Dr. Winkley's church on Bulfinch Street in Boston. His daughter and a son, Joseph, pre-deceased him in 1877.

== Selected works ==
=== Plays ===
- Captain Kyd; or, The Wizard of the Sea (National Theatre, Boston, 1830)
- Venison Preserved, or a Pot Uncovered.
- Eugene Aram (Tremont Theatre, Boston, 1832), an adaptation of the novel by Edward Bulwer-Lytton
- The Liberty Tree; or, Boston Boys in '76 (Warren Theatre, Boston, June 17, 1832), written for the 50th anniversary of the end of the Revolutionary War
- The Green Mountain Boy (Chestnut Street Theatre, Philadelphia, February 25, 1833), a comedy in three acts
- Tam O'Shanter (Warren Theatre, Boston, November 1833), three acts
- The Fire Warrior (Warren Theatre, Boston, March 31, 1834), three acts
- Custom. a comedy in five acts
- Plymouth Rock (Warren Theater, Boston, November 22, 1834), a drama in three acts
- Three Experiments in Banking
- Yankee in Tripoli (Park Theatre, New York), drama in two acts
- Hawks of Hawk Hollow, drama in three acts, based on the novel of the same name
- Hunter of the West
- Bride of Johah, a burletta
- Ice Queen, three acts
- Factory Girl, a drama in three acts
- Witches of New England, three acts
- The Carpenter of Rouen; or, A Revenge for the Massacre of St. Bartholomew (Chatham Theatre, New York City, November 16, 1840), drama in four acts
- The Surgeon of Paris; or, The Mask of the Huguenots (National Theatre, Boston, January 8, 1838), drama in four acts and sequel to The Carpenter of Rouen
- Moll Pitcher; or, The Fortune Teller of Lynn (National Theatre, Boston, 1839). Based on the life of Moll Pitcher, a drama in four acts
- Solon Shingle; or, The People's Lawyer (National Theatre, Boston, 1839), a drama in two acts
- The Siege of Boston (Tremont Theatre, Boston, January 1841)
- Quadroon (Tremont Theatre, Boston, April 19, 1841)
- Andek the Arab
- Brazier of Naples (Chestnut Street Theatre, Philadelphia, 1841)
- Ten Thousand a Year (National Theatre, Boston, January 21, 1842), adaptation of a novel by the same name
- Two Journeymen Locksmiths (National Theatre, Boston, April 16, 1842)
- Robert Kyd, four acts
- Stephen Burroughs
- Morton's Hope
- Battle of Lake Erie (Tremont Theatre, Boston, October 31, 1842) a drama in three acts
- Indian Hord
- The Wheelwright (Boston 1845), a drama in four acts
- Last Days of Pompeii (Tremont Theatre, Boston, February 1843), in four acts
- Infernal Machine
- Horse Hunters, in three acts
- The Three Experiments of Living (Boston Museum, Boston, March 13, 1848) a dramatization of the novel by Hannah F. Lee
- Old Job and Jacob Gray (Boston Museum, Boston, 1849)
- The Silver Spoon; or, Our Own Folks (Boston Museum, Boston, February 16, 1852)
- The Last Dollar (Boston Museum, Boston, September 1959)
- The Batkins at Home, or Life in Cranberry Centre. sequel to The Silver Spoon
- Sons of the Cape (Boston Museum, Boston, February 1866)
- Captain Lascar, the Pilot of Brest (Howard Athenaeum, Boston, December 17, 1866)
- Paul Revere and the Sons of Liberty (1875)

=== Books ===
- Life of Jefferson S. Batkins, Member from Cranberry Centre. with Jefferson Batkins. Boston: Loring Publisher, 1871.

== Honors ==
In 1916, The Bostonian Society in the Old State House acquired a bust on Jones, made by Pietro Gariboldi.
