= National Theatre (Boston, 1836) =

Coordinates: 42°21′48.05″N 71°3′38.47″W

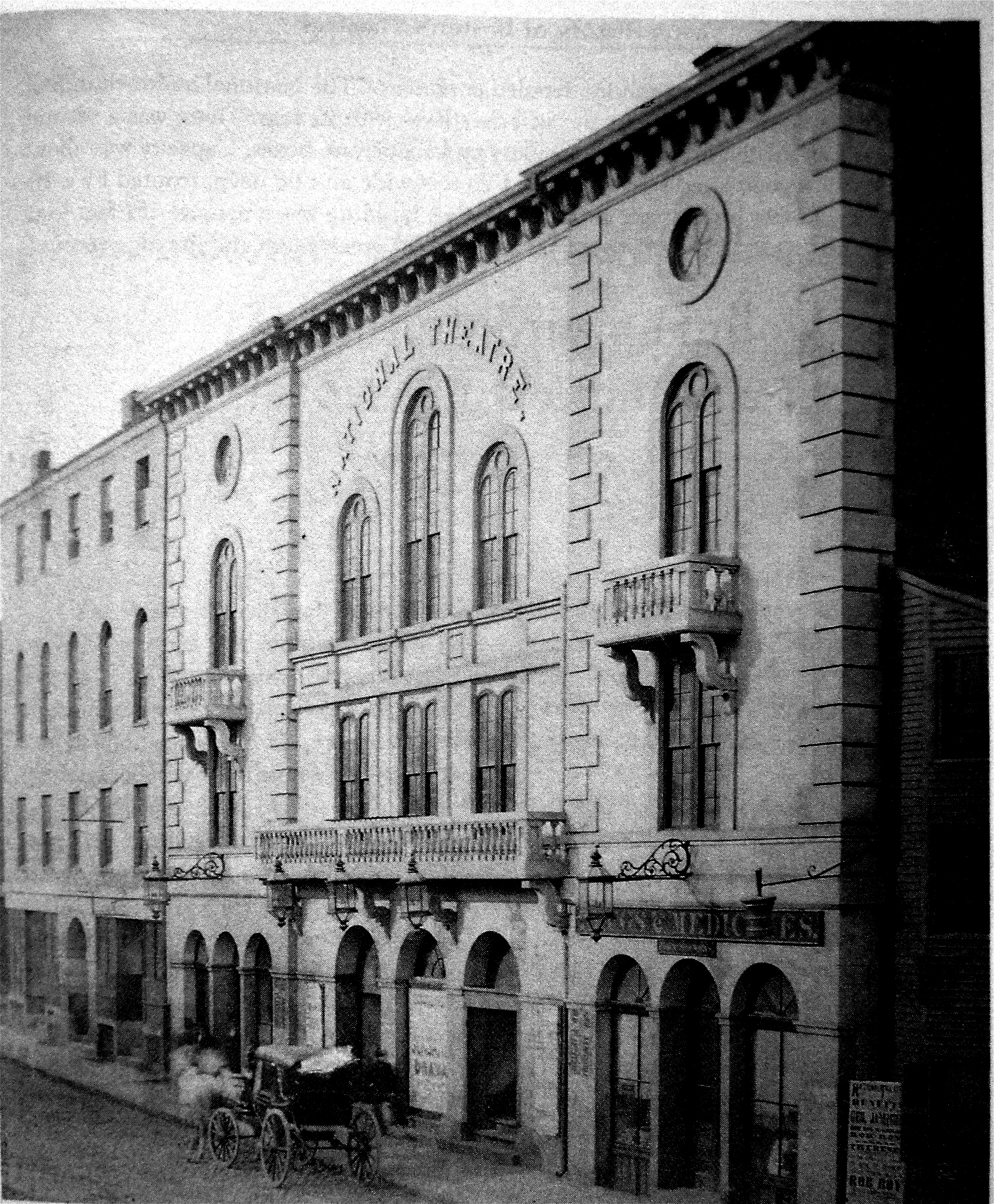
The National Theatre, corner Portland and Traverse Street, West End, Boston, ca.1860

The National Theatre (1836-1863) was a theatre in the West End of Boston, Massachusetts, in the mid-19th century. William Pelby established the enterprise in 1836, and presented productions of "original pieces, and the efforts of a well selected stock company, which, with few exceptions, have been American. The scenery is of the highest order, and the business of the stage well directed. Mr C.A. Eaton made his debut at this theatre, and here Mr. F.S. Hill's early labors were eminently successful. Mr. J.S. Jones has written and produced on this stage thirty pieces, embracing every department except tragedy." William Washburn designed the building, erected on the site of the former Warren Theatre. Performers at the National included Edwin Adams, Marietta Zanfretta, Jean Margaret Davenport, Julia Dean, Jonathan Harrington, W.H. Smith, Mary Ann Vincent, and Billy Whitlock. In 1852 the theatre burnt down, and was rebuilt. In 1863 the building was again destroyed by fire.

== Architecture ==
In 1836:

"this theatre, planned and erected by Mr William Washburn, is 120 by 76 feet (23 m), exclusive of the saloons, refreshment rooms, &c., which are contained in an adjoining building, 20 by 60 feet (18 m), fronting on Traverse Street, and communicating with the lobbies. The leading architectural features are Doric presenting brood pilasters with slight projections on the front which support an.unbroken entablature and a pediment, 18 feet (5.5 m) high at each end. The roof is covered with slate and zinc, and is surmounted by an octagonal lantern, 12 feet (3.7 m) in diameter and 18 feet (5.5 m) high, having a window on each of its sides. The structure is covered on the exterior walls with cement, in imitation' of granite, which gives a uniform and beautiful appearance. The interior comprises a pit, with 600 seats, three tiers of boxes, with 336 seats each, and a gallery with 200 seats. The saloons, lobbies, refreshment rooms, &c. are spacious, convenient and well ventilated by large windows on the two streets and in rear. The boxes have five rows of seats each, and are accessible from both streets, affording, in case of fire or other cause of alarm, ready egress from the house. The main roof is supported by 18 hard pine pillars, 36 feet (11 m) high and 10 inches square, which also support a portion of the boxes, and divide them from the lobbies. The remaining boxes are supported by 2 octagonal pillars of the same material, 9 inches in diameter. The main ceiling is a single arch, of 55 feet (17 m) span, rising within 9 feet (2.7 m) of the ridge. The gallery is entirely above the level cornice of the building, having an arched ceiling which rises five feet higher than the main ceiling, and is ventilated by a large round window placed in the centre of the tympanum. The proscenium presents an opening 40 feet (12 m) wide and 33 feet (10 m) high. It is composed of pilasters, having ornamented capitals and bases, which support a beautifully enriched arch, crowned with the American eagle. The depth of the stage is 61 feet (19 m). The circle of boxes is so arranged, that in every part of the house a full view is had of the stage. The decorations are in good taste. The lower tier of boxes is adorned with paintings of the battles of the United States Navy; the second tier bears the arms of the States, and the upper parts have appropriate scenes from the Iliads."

== Performances ==
Performances
Year	Play	Author
1837	Carpenter of Rouen! or The confrerie of St. Bartholomew	J.S. Jones
1838	3 degrees of Banking	J.S. Jones
1838	Surgeon of Paris; or, The Mask of the Huguenots	Joseph Stevens Jones
1838	Hamlet	
1838	Valet de Sham	Charles Selby
1839		
1839	Moll Pitcher; or, The Fortune Teller of Lynn	
1839	Solon Shingle; or, The People's Lawyer	Joseph Stevens Jones
1842	Ivanhoe	
1844	Jack Sheppard	J.B. Buckstone
1844	Nervous Man	William Bayle Bernard
1846	Wizard of the wave! or—The ship of the avenger!	John Thomas Haines
1848		
1848		Jonathan Harrington (ventriloquist)
1847	Witchcraft! or the Martyrs of Salem	Cornelius Mathews
1849	Serpent of the Nile	
1849	Ben the Boatswain	Thomas Egerton Wilks
1849	Mazeppa or The wild horse of Tartary	
1849	Ivanhoe! or—The knights templars	
1851	Stranger or,--Misanthropy & repentance	Kotzebue
1851	Honey moon or, how to rule a wife	John Tobin
1852	Philip Augustus of France	J. Westland Marston
1852	I've Swallowed a Policeman	
1852	Heir-at-Law	
1853	Pet of the petticoats	John Baldwin Buckstone
1853	Fortunio and his seven gifted servants	Madame d'Aulnoy/James Planché
1853	Madelaine, The Belle of the Faubourg	Virginia Cunningham
1853	Faint heart never won fair lady	J.R. Planche
1853	Wept of the Wish-ton-Wish	Wm. Bayle Bernard
1853	Tower of Nesle! or The chamber of death	George Almar, adapted from Dumas and Gaillardet's La tour de Nesle.
1853	Six degrees of crime	Frederic Stanhope Hill
1853	Gale Breezely! or, The tale of a tar	J.B. Johnstone
1853	Ernest Maltravers: or, The robber father and maniac daughter	Bulwer-Lytton
1853	Lady of Lyons	Bulwer
1854	Egyptian Prince, "the very popular Ethiopian farce"	
1854	Othello	
1854	That Good for Nothing	
1854	Faustus	
1854	Monte Cristo	
1854	Sledge Driver	Planche
1854	Much Ado About Nothing	
1854	Mary Tudor or, The artisan and the Jew	
1854	Fallen angel or Faust and Margaret	Dion Boucicault
1854	Devil's in it	
1854	Invisible prince! or, The island of tranquil delights	Planche
1856		Cushing's New York Circus
1858	Three fast men Or, The female Robinson Crusoes	
1858	Linda, the Cigar Girl	
1858	O'Flanagan and the fairies	
1858	Buck bison: or, Baby Blanche, the child of the prairie	
1858	Woman's love Or, The secrets of the heart	
1858	Farmer's son Or, The golden axe	
1859	Inez, the poisoner	Frederic S. Hill
1859	Flowers of the Forest, A gipsey story	J.B. Buckstone
1859	Cross of gold, or Theresa's vow	
1859	Three guardsmen or, The seige [sic?] of Rochelle	
1859	Magic pills! Or, The conjuror's gift, "a grand Christmas pantomime"	

== Images ==
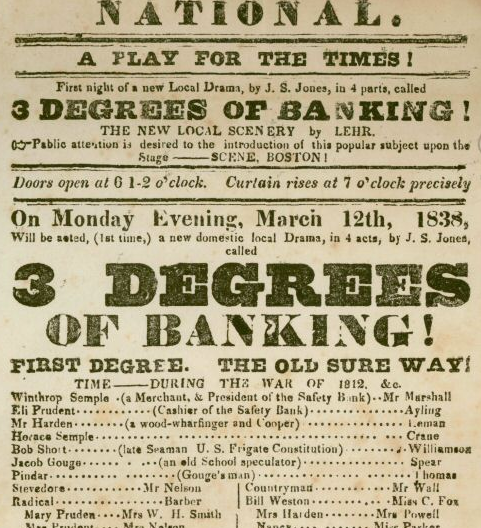
Advertisement for "3 Degrees of Banking," 1838

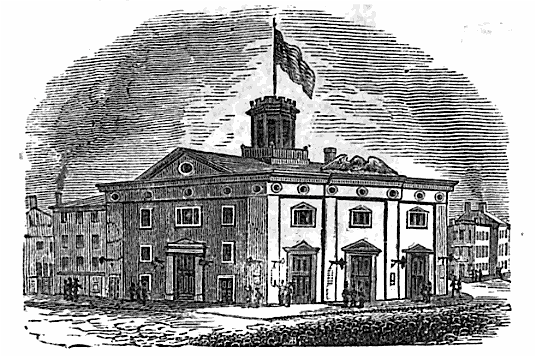
The National, designed by William Washburn, as it appeared ca.1838

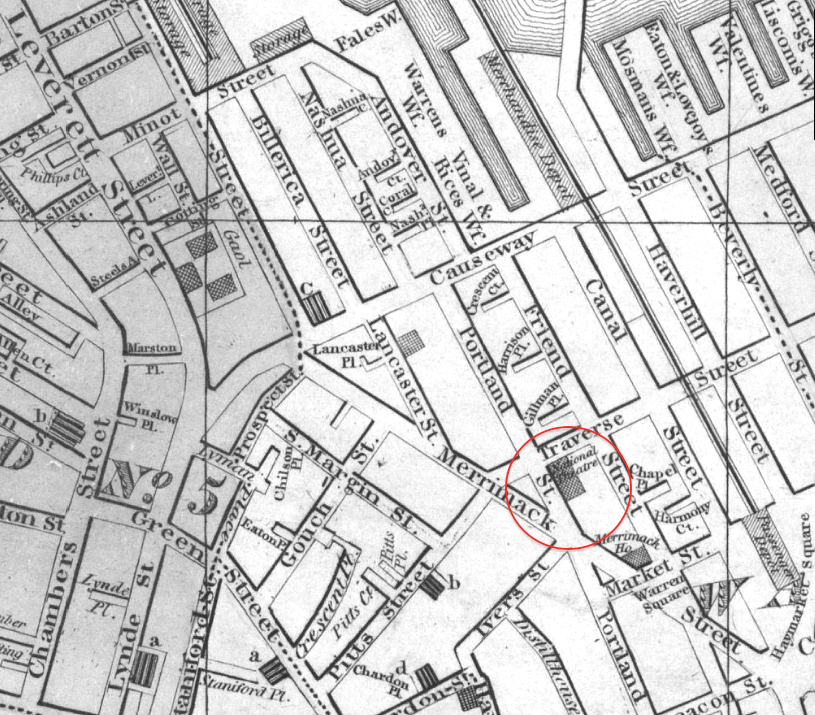
Detail of 1846 map of Boston, showing National Theatre at corner of Portland St. and Traverse St.

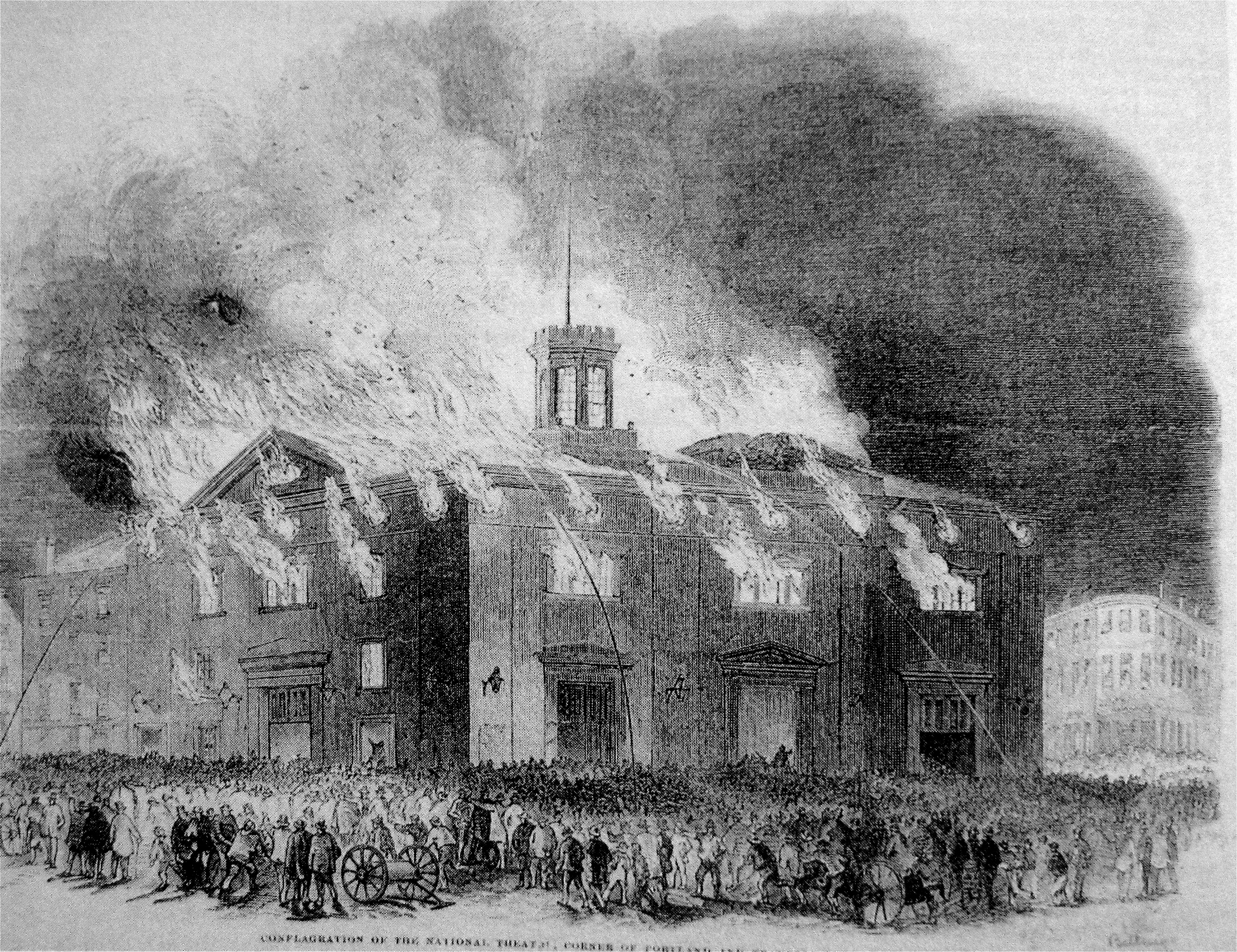
The National on fire, 1852

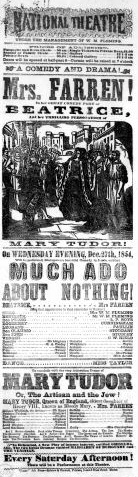
Advertisement for "Much Ado About Nothing," 1854

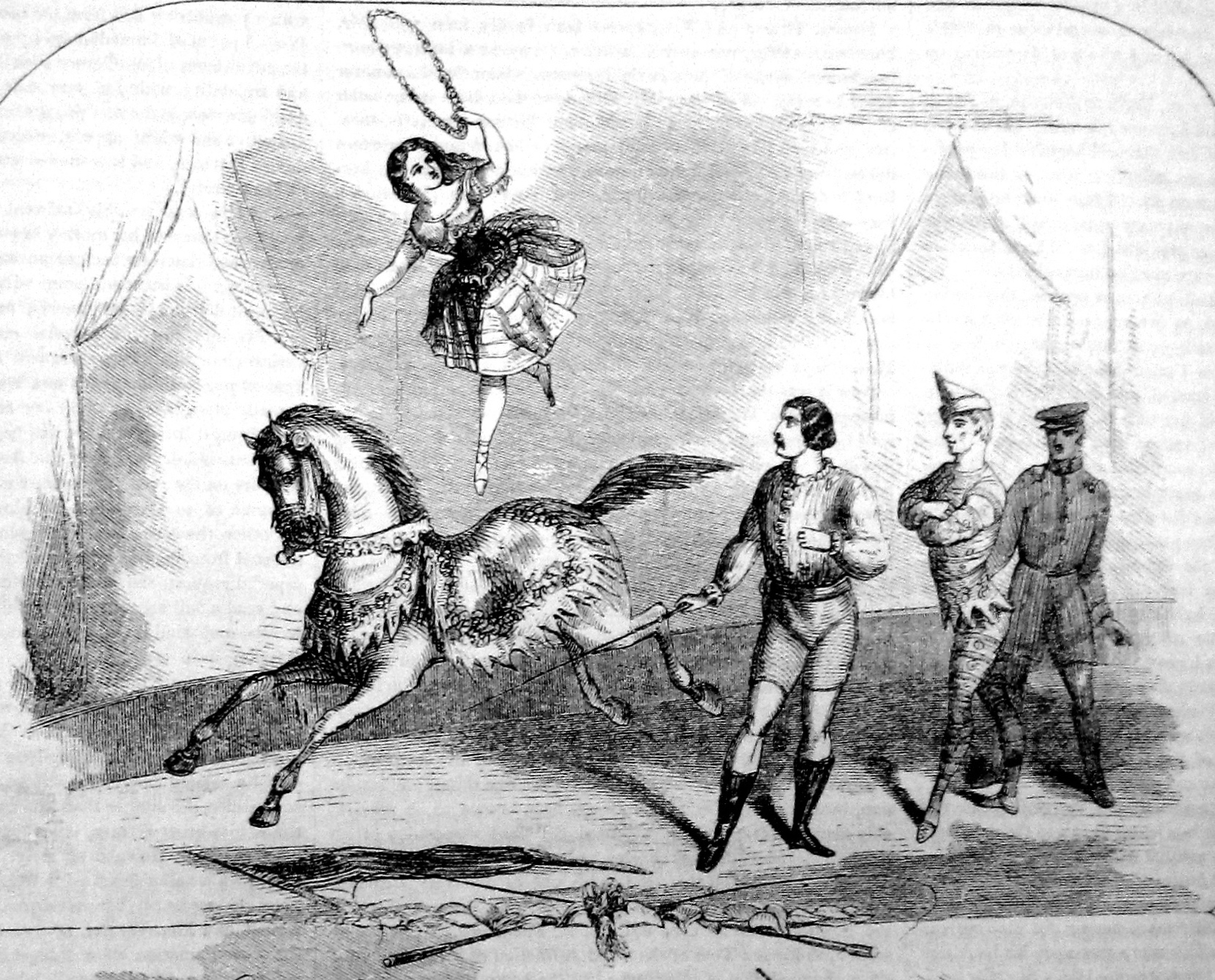
Cushing's New York Circus, 1856

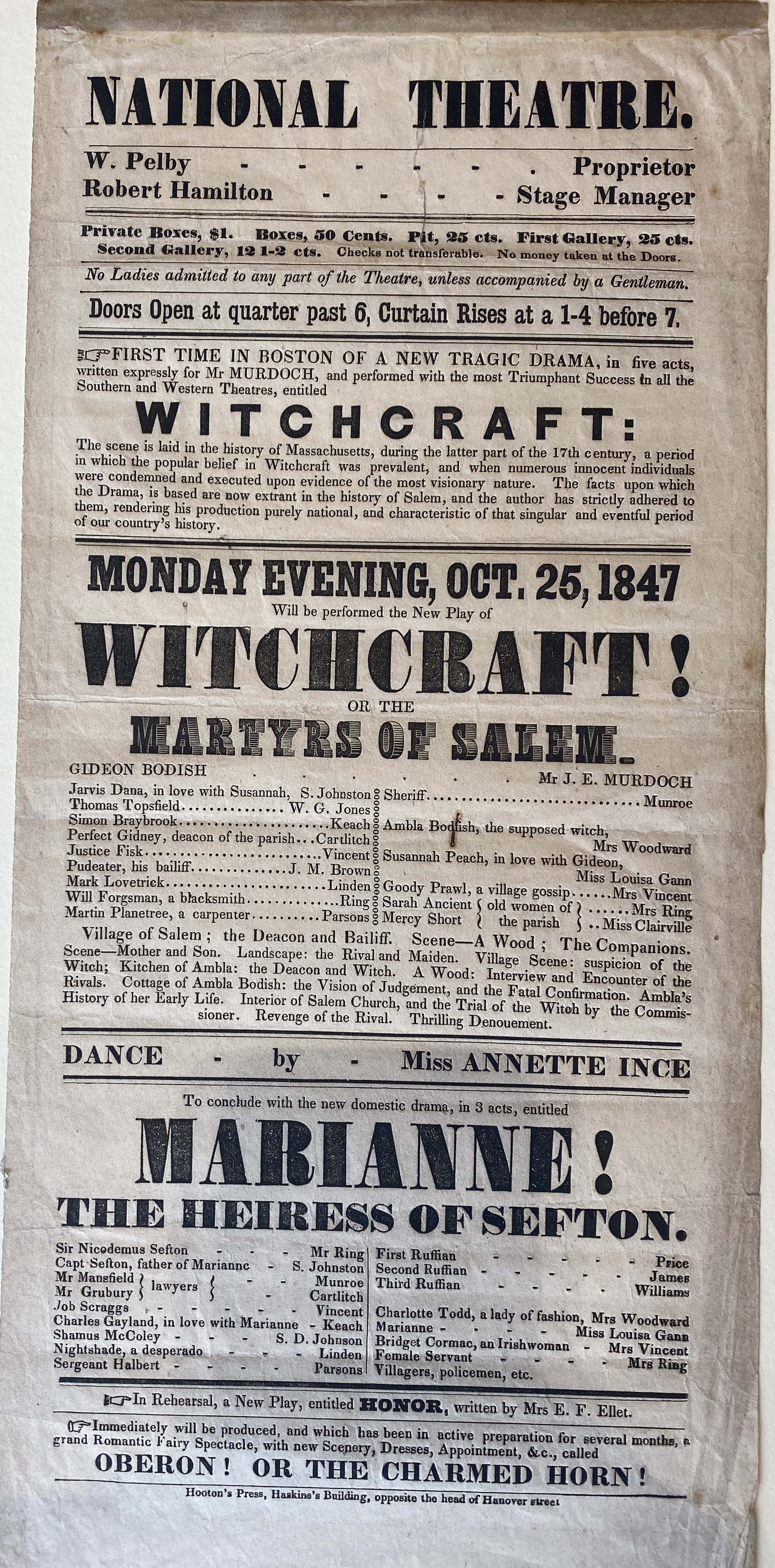
Broadside for "Witchcraft! Or The Martyrs of Salem" (1847)

=== Managers/Proprietors ===
Managers and proprietors included: William Pelby (1836-1850), William B. English (ca.1857-1863), Thomas Barry, Rosalie Pelby, John B. Wright, Henry W. Fenno, George Bird, Joseph Leonard, W.M. Fleming, Joseph Cushing, G.H. Griffiths, James Pilgrim, Henry Willard, Charles R. Thome, Sr., John Moran, Walter Gay, Henry Willard, F.B. Conway, E.B. Williams, Thomas Hampton, J. C. Myers, C.J. Boniface.

== Variant names ==
- Willard's National Theatre, 1856
- People's National Theatre, 1856, 1859
- Union Concert Hall, 1862
