= James Ambrose Cutting =

American photographer and inventor

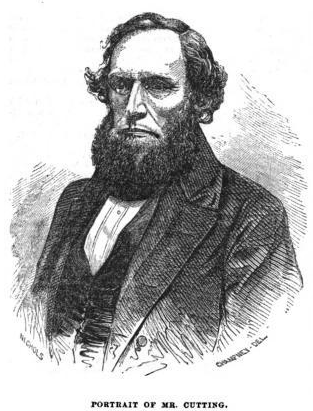
Portrait of J.A. Cutting, 1862

James Ambrose Cutting (1814–1867) was an American photographer and inventor, sometimes called the inventor of the Ambrotype photographic process.

He grew up in poverty on a farm in Haverhill, New Hampshire. At age 28, he invented a new type of beehive in 1842, and on the money from selling his patents moved to Boston, Massachusetts.

== Ambrotypes ==
To create an ambrotype, the photographer sensitized a polished plate of glass by the wet plate collodion process and exposed the plate in a camera to produce a negative image. The wet plate collodion process was invented just a few years before by Frederick Scott Archer and widely used for glass negatives, but in an ambrotype the collodion image is used as a positive, instead of a negative.

When dry, the glass plate was then backed either with black paint, metal, cloth, or paper; this black backing made light areas of the negative appear darker, turning the negative image into a positive. Some ambrotypes were made with ruby or dark green glass to simulate the effect of a backing without using one. Ambrotypes often were hand-colored, most commonly with dabs of red paint on the cheeks of the sitter. They were housed in wood or thermoplastic cases (also called 'Union cases'), like the daguerreotype photographs with which they are often confused; an ambrotype is easily distinguished from a daguerreotype because its surface is not reflective, as daguerreotype surfaces are. Ambrotypes were most popular during the mid- to late-1850s but continued to be available through the 1890s.

In 1854, Cutting took out three patents relating to the process of creating images on glass using the wet plate collodion process. While Cutting is sometimes referred to as the inventor of the ambrotype, his three photographic patents of 1854 refer only to improvements in the process, rather than the idea of the collodion positive itself. Ambrotypes (black-backed collodion positives) are reported to have been made at least as early as 1852 by Frederick Scott Archer (see Schimmelman).

Although Cutting, the patent holder, had named the process after himself, it appears the term, "ambrotype" itself may have been first coined in the gallery of Marcus Aurelius Root, a well-known daguerreotypist, as documented in the 1864 book The Camera and the Pencil.

== Patents ==
Patent Numbers 11,213, 11,266 and 11,267: Awarded to James Ambrose Cutting of Boston, Massachusetts in 1854 for creating collodion positive photographs on glass. The first and second of these patents refer to the chemicals & handling used in the collodion process, while the third describes a method for sealing finished collodion images beneath a layer of glass using balsam - the so-called Cutting's Patent Ambrotype.

Patent Number 19,626: In 1858, James Ambrose Cutting & Lodowick H. Bradford of Boston, Massachusetts were awarded a patent for improvements in Photolithography. They defined a process of created a very durable photographic picture on a lithographic limestone printing plate.

== Later years ==
In 1859, he and Henry D Butler first opened their Boston Aquarial Gardens, a public aquarium on Bromfield Street, which they later moved to 240 Washington Street. His partner wrote the book The Family Aquarium which published in 1858 was one of the first books written in the United States solely about the aquarium.

The first advertisements for the Grand aquariums at the Boston Aquarial Gardens appeared in the April 12, 1859, edition of the Boston Post. "This magnificent display of one of the most fascinating phenomena of nature is now open for public exhibition," announced the Boston Post. "These Ocean Conservatories are filled with rare marine animals imported and collected exclusively for this Establishment. They present us with a perfect and striking illustration of Life Beneath The Waters." The facility was eventually purchased by P.T. Barnum, under whose management ("Barnum's Aquarial Gardens") it became more of a show-hall than a serious scientific establishment; "Madame Lanista," who wrestled with snakes, was a typical attraction of this period. The property eventually became the Theatre Comique in 1864-67.

Distraught over the conversion of the Aquarial Gardens into an amusement hall, Cutting suffered a nervous collapse, from which he never recovered; he died in August 1867 in an insane asylum in Worcester, MA. Article in New York Times: 'Death of an Inventor'
