= Moll Pitcher =

American clairvoyant

- Born: ca. 1736; Marblehead, Massachusetts
- Died: April 9, 1813; Lynn, Massachusetts
- Occupation: Fortune-teller
- Spouse: Robert Pitcher
- Children: John, Rebecca, Ruth, Lydia
- Parent(s): Aholiab Diamond; Lydia Silsbee

Moll Pitcher (born Mary Diamond; c. 1736 – April 9, 1813) was a clairvoyant and fortune-teller from Lynn, Massachusetts. A tree in West Dedham, today Westwood, was named for her in 1837.

== Background ==
Moll Pitcher was said to have descended from a long line of "wizards." Her father, Aholiab Diamond, was a cordwainer in Lynn. He and Lydia Silsbee were married in 1735. There were no public schools for girls at the time of her youth, but Moll Pitcher seems to have received some education. On October 2, 1760, she married Robert Pitcher, probably an apprentice of her father. The couple continued to live with the Diamonds and had four children, John, Rebecca, Ruth and Lydia. Her parents and brother died about 1788, and Moll Pitcher inherited the family property.

== Predictions and popularity ==
It is said that soon after her marriage she was known as a fortune-teller, a reader of tea leaves, with a clientele that continued to increase in importance for the next 50 years that she lived. Her fame reached throughout New England, and her successful predictions astounded the educated and the uneducated alike. She was consulted by all classes, including visiting noblemen from Europe. Her predictions concerned "love affairs, legacies, discovery of crime, successful lottery tickets, and the more common contingencies of life." But her most important predictions involved the outcome of voyages. Crews were said to refuse to sail on voyages she predicted would be disastrous, and shipowners to refuse to risk their ships.

Treasure-seekers also consulted her, but she was said to have little patience with them, sometimes responding "Fools, if I knew where money was buried, do you think I would part with the secret?" Eccentric (and successful) businessman "Lord" Timothy Dexter was said to place implicit confidence in her predictions.

== In literature ==
John Greenleaf Whittier (1807–92), also a native of Massachusetts, wrote a 900-line poem about her entitled simply Moll Pitcher. It was Whittier's second published work. The poem is not complimentary, describing her as a witch engaged in sinful work:

She stood upon a bare tall craig

Which overlooked her rugged cot -
A wasted, gray, and meagre hag,
In featured evil as her lot.
She had the crooked nose of a witch,
And a crooked back and chin;
And in her gait she had a hitch,
And in her hand she carried a switch,

To aid her work of sin, -

Contemporaries, however, describe her as plain: not beautiful, but not a hag; ordinary in appearance. Later in life, Whittier grew to dislike the poem.

Massachusetts playwright J.S. Jones (1811–87) wrote Moll Pitcher, Or the Fortune Teller of Lynn.

She is also Referenced by Nathaniel Hawthorne in the House of the Seven Gables (1851) and The Blithedale Romance (1852).

== Death ==
Pitcher died in 1813 and was buried in the West Lynn Burial Ground. Her grave was unmarked until 1887, when a tombstone with the following epitaph (from Whittier's poem) was erected in her memory:

Even she, our own weird heroine,

Sole Pythoness of ancient Lynn,
Sleeps calmly where the living laid her;
And the wide realm of sorcery,
Left, by its latest mistress, free,

Hath found no gray and skilled invader.
