= Concert Hall (Boston, Massachusetts) =

American music venue

Coordinates: 42°21′37.49″N 71°3′37.23″W

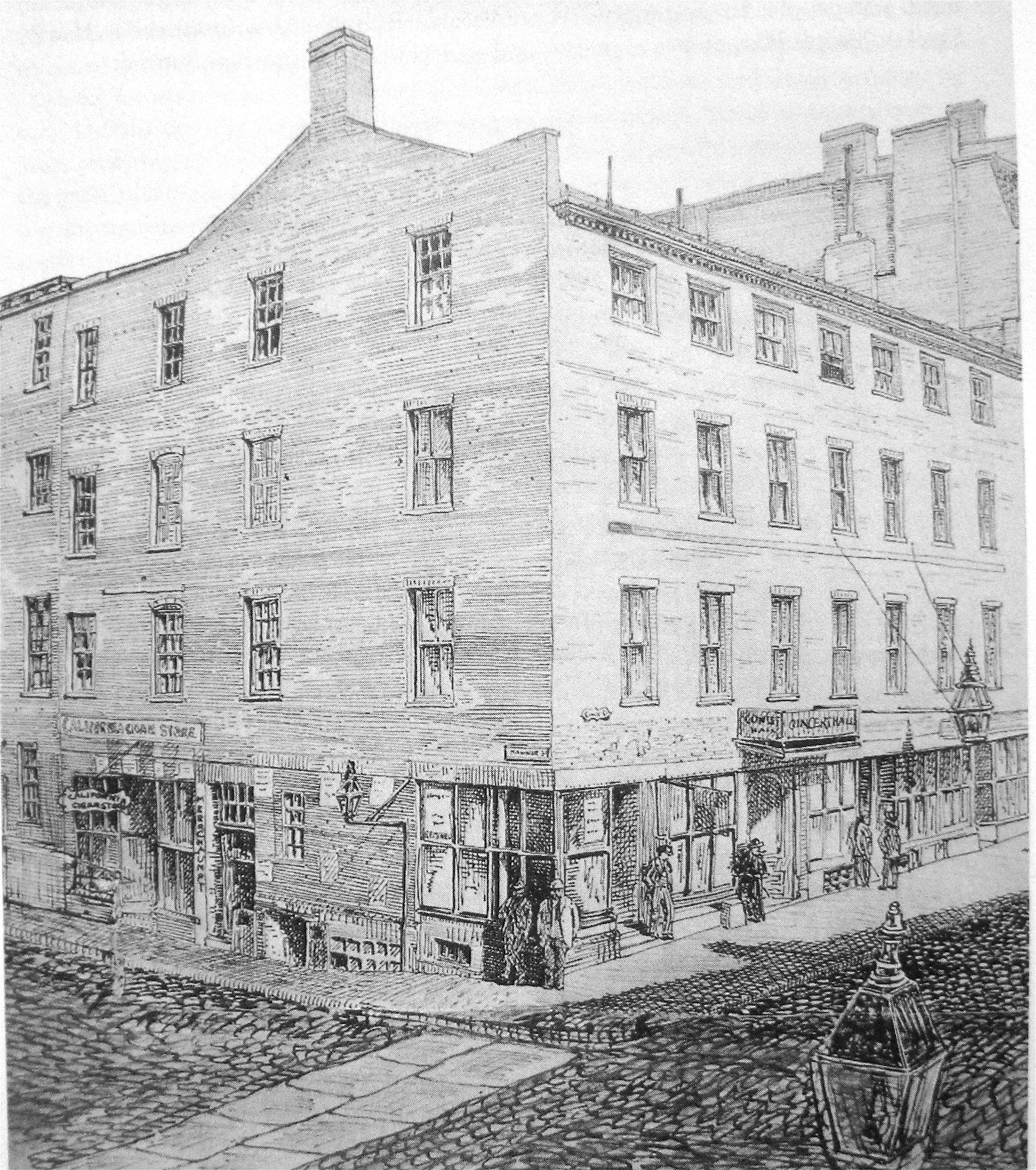
Artist's rendering of the Concert Hall as it appeared in the mid-19th century

The Concert Hall (1752–1869) was a performance and meeting space in Boston, Massachusetts, located at Hanover Street and Queen Street. Meetings, dinners, concerts, and other cultural events took place in the hall.

== Brief history ==
=== Architecture ===
According to some, Stephen Deblois built the hall in 1752. The Concert Hall building occupied a lot on Hanover Street that had changed owners several times through the years, beginning from the earliest days of Boston in the mid-17th century. "The site was first known as Houchin's Corner, from a tanner of that name who occupied it." Owners included: Gilbert and Lewis Deblois (1749); Stephen Deblois (1764); William Turner (1769); John and Jonathan Amory (1789-ca.1798).

At some point after 1787, architect Charles Bulfinch re-modelled the building ("new interior and enlarged," according to his notes). Around 1798, it was a "brick house, three stories, thirty windows, value $3000." It "underwent various alterations until torn down in 1869, to make way for the widening of Hanover Street."

=== Events ===
Concert Hall served multiple functions, mainly as a venue for groups of people to gather to hear concerts, and to attend meetings and formal dinners. The Freemasons met there from the 1750s until at least 1818. In January, 1755, the Boston News-Letter advertised "a concert of musick" at the hall, tickets four shillings. The hall may have had "a small organ by the London builder John Snetzler from 1763 to 1774."

John Rowe, a merchant who built Boston's Rowe's Wharf, attended events at the Concert Hall and kept notes in his diary:

March 16, 1769: "Spent the evening at the Fife Major's concert at Concert Hall; there was a large and genteel company and the best musick I have heard performed there."
March 23, 1770: "Went in the evening to the Concert Hall to hear Mr. Joan read the Beggars Opera and sing the songs; he read but indifferently, but sung in taste; there were upwards one hundred people there."
Jan. 3, 1771: "Spent the evening at Concert Hall, where there was a concert performed by Hartly Morgan and others; after the concert a dance. The Commodore [i.e., James Gambier?] and all the captains of the navy here was there, and Colo. Dalrymple, and fifty or sixty gentlemen and the same number of ladies present."
Jan. 18, 1771: At the dinner on the Queen's birthday at Concert Hall ... there was "very good dancing and good musick, but very bad wine and punch."

Oct. 15, 1771: "I spent the former part of the evening at the Concert Hall, it being Mr. [David] Propert's concert; a good company, upwards of 200."

Josiah Flagg (b.1737) performed concerts at the hall. "On June 7, 1770, Flagg gave... a "Grand concert" that, though the full program was not listed in the newspapers, was to include "a duet to be sung by a Gentleman who lately read and sung in Concert-Hall, and Mr. Flagg. ...The program for Flagg's...concert on May 17, 1771, was printed in The Massachusetts Spy the day before the event. This notable program... at Concert Hall, included four vocal pieces, three overtures, two concertos, three 'symphonies,' and a violin solo. The bulk of the program was composed of works by such lesser composers as Stanley, Schwindl, Abel, and Ricci, but also included music by Stamitz, Handel, and J.C. Bach." In addition to performing, Flagg also organized some events at the hall. In February, 1771, Flagg presented works by Bach and Handel, performed by violinist W.S. Morgan, and the 64th Regiment Military Band.

Other concerts included one by David Propert, organist at Trinity Church, who gave a concert on October 15, 1771. In 1774, Mr. Selby "... played a harpsichord concerto in concerts sponsored by W. S. Morgan."

The Concert Hall was also used for dancing classes. Charles Pelham (b.1722) advertised dancing lessons in 1762: "Charles Pelham hereby informs all the Gentlemen and Ladies in Town and Country that he proposes again to open a Dancing School on Monday the third day of May next, at Concert Hall, where he will give constant Attendance as usual, every Monday, Thursday and Saturday in the Afternoon, provided he may meet with suitable encouragement." Later, "Thomas Turner had a dancing and fencing academy there in 1776."

Several balls took place at the hall in the 1770s. For instance, "the fourth Subscription Ball will be held at Concert Hall on Thursday, the 29th instant [of January], 1776." Also: "on Monday, the 11th of March, will be given at Concert Hall, a Subscription Masked Ball. By the fifth of March, a number of different masks will be prepared & sold by almost all the milliners and mantua makers in Town." "Governor John Hancock gave, in 1778, a grand ball in Concert Hall to the officers of D'Estaing's fleet, at which three hundred persons were present."

From ca.1789 through 1846, the Society of the Cincinnati of Massachusetts held annual meetings at the hall.

The ordination of Chandler Robbins (1810–1882) as a minister of the Second Church was celebrated at the Concert Hall in December 1833. One attendee wrote in his diary: "The dinner was sumptuous; but it was the first ordination I ever attended where there was no wine, nor even cider, nor indeed anything to drink but water; excepting that in the midst of dinner coffee was served round to such as desired it."

A number of non-musical entertainments took place in the 19th century. Ventriloquist Jonathan Harrington performed in March 1831. In March, 1834, the "500-lb. 8-year-old" Rose Rich appears at the hall. In September, 1835, "161-year-old" Joyce Heth appears; she was "George Washington's former nurse."

=== Staff ===
As for staff, "James Vila took charge of Concert Hall in 1789," and continued as "keeper" for many years, until at least 1803. Tilley Whitcomb was associated with the hall around 1805. For many years Peter Bent Brigham (1807–1877) oversaw the hall, probably beginning around 1837. Around 1840, Henry Hannington (ca.1803-1857) worked as "proprietor of the celebrated Dioramas as exhibited at Concert Hall"

== Timeline of selected events ==
- 1770
  - "A new song composed by a Son of Liberty and sung by Mr. Flagg"
  - The Beggar's Opera, performed by Mr. Joan [i.e. James Juhan]
  - The Mock Doctor by Henry Fielding, presented by Mr. Joan [i.e. James Juhan]
  - Damon and Phillida by Colley Cibber; selections from Artaxerxes by Thomas Arne; A Hymn to the Moon, from the Opera of Cynthia"
  - Selections from Lionel and Clarissa by Isaac Bickerstaffe and Charles Dibdin
- 1771
  - Organ concerto by Mr. Selby [i.e. William Selby, or possibly John Selby]
  - Concert of selections from Handel's Acis and Galatea, presented by Josiah Flagg
- 1774
  - Harpsichord concerto performed by Mr. Selby [possibly John Selby]; sponsored by W. S. Morgan
  - Concert of selections from Artaxerxes performed by W.S. Morgan.
- 1788
  - Musical Society
  - Concert by Mr. Deverill and Master Brewer, vocalists
- 1791
  - Concert by Mr. and Mrs. Solomon, vocalists ("much to be commended, and certainly much to be amended")
- 1792
  - The Evening Brush by John Collins, performed by Charles Stuart Powell
- 1794
  - Mr. Baker performs "dramatic olios"
- 1795
  - Concert of works by Haydn, Hook, and others, performed by Bartlett, Berkenhead, Clifford, Collins, Jones, Stone
- 1804
  - Mr. Rannie, sword-swallower, ventriloquist. "Mr. R. has a very surprising fish, which will perform deceptions that cannot fail to astonish every beholder. This fish will pick up any card in the pack that may only be thought of. Twenty ladies or gentlemen may draw cards from the pack, the fish will immediately draw each lady and gentlemen's card without making the smallest mistake."
- 1805
  - Concert by Gottlieb Graupner
  - Concert of "vocal and instrumental music, interspersed with various recitations" performed by "Mr. & Mrs. Fox; Messrs. Bates, Mallet and Shaw, assisted by the Band of Music under Mr. Everdell"
- 1806
  - Boston Light Infantry dinner
- 1811
  - Ball on anniversary of Washington's birthday
  - "Mr. Turner's annual exhibition and ball"
  - Winslow Blues dinner
  - "Mr. Schaffer's annual ball and exhibition of his scholars' acquirements"
  - Washington Monument Association meeting
- 1812
  - Constitutional Club meeting
- 1813
  - "Public dinner ... to Gen. Dearborn"
- 1815
  - "Splendid dinner" for "General Miller, in testimony of his gallant and distinguished services on the frontiers of Upper Canada"
  - Concert of works by Mozart, Arne, Haydn, King, Pleyel, Rosetti, Shield, Wainwright, Paul Wranitzky performed by Mr. Turner, Mrs. Graupner, T. Granger, Mr. Bray, Miss C. Graupner, Mr. McFarland
  - Masonic funeral of John Warren
- 1816
  - Concert of works by Berton, Martini, Plantade performed by Messrs. Gilles & Etienne
  - "Exhibition of the scholars of Mr. Carter"
  - "Mr. Turner's exhibition of dancing"
- 1817
  - Company of Independent Cadets anniversary dinner
- 1818
  - Cincinnati dinner, "entertainment served up by Mr. Forster in a stile of great elegance"
  - Levees by "Miss Hartley, the Albanese lady"
  - Maritime Theatre
  - "The Soul of the Soldiery celebrated their anniversary ... among their guests ... were the vice president of the United States, the governor of the Commonwealth, and other gentlemen"
- 1819
  - Sword-swallower Ramo Samee ("native of Seringapatam")
  - Performance by Mr. Brunel
  - "Picturesque representation by Mr. Ardenond"
  - Friends of American Manufactures meeting
  - Oration on Masonry by "a lady"
- 1820
  - Meeting "relative to the recent decision of Congress on the Missouri Question"
- 1821
  - Debating Society meeting
  - Convention of Congregational Ministers dinner
- 1822
  - Lecture by Mr. Artiguenave
- 1823
  - Exhibition of painting "Wreck of the Albion"
  - Friends of Domestic Woolen Manufactures meeting
- 1824
  - Washington Society dinner
  - Massachusetts Charitable Society meeting, Thomas Melvill, president
- 1825
  - Franklin Typographical Society anniversary
  - Exhibition of pictures by Mr. Fisher
