= Boston Museum (theatre) =

Coordinates: 42.3586°N 71.0596°W

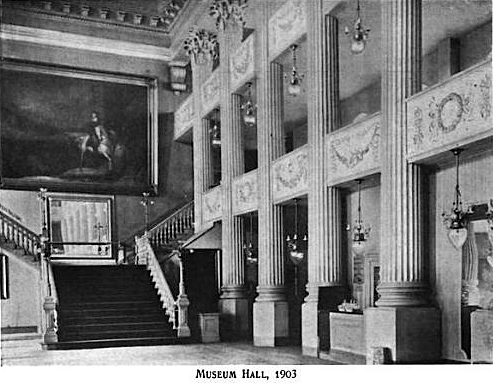
Interior of the Boston Museum, Tremont St., 1903. On the far wall is Thomas Sully's The Passage of the Delaware (now in the Museum of Fine Arts, Boston)

The Boston Museum (1841–1903), also called the Boston Museum and Gallery of Fine Arts, was a theatre, wax museum, natural history museum, zoo, and art museum in 19th-century Boston, Massachusetts. Moses Kimball established the enterprise in 1841.

== History ==
The Boston Museum exhibited items acquired from Ethan Allen Greenwood's former New England Museum; tableaux of wax figures; live animals; and artworks by John Singleton Copley, Gilbert Stuart, Benjamin West, Thomas Badger and others. Early live shows presented, for instance, "the musical olio, consisting of solos on glass bells, and birch-bark whistling." Theatrical performances began in 1843. Through the years, notable performers included: Lawrence Barrett, Edwin Booth, John Wilkes Booth, Madge Lessing, Richard Mansfield, E. H. Sothern, Mary Ann Vincent, and William Warren.

An advertisement of 1850 described the museum's key attractions:

The museum is the largest, most valuable, and best arranged in the United States. It comprises no less than seven different museums, to which has been added the present year, besides the constant daily accumulation of articles, one half of the celebrated Peale's Philadelphia Museum, swelling the already immense collection to upwards of half a million articles, the greatest amount of objects of interest to be found together at any one place in America; and an entirely new hall of wax statuary.... and the immense collection of birds, beasts, fish, insects and reptiles;... paintings, engravings and statuary; ... Egyptian mummies, ... family of Peruvian mummies; the duck-billed platypus;... the curious half-fish, half-human Fejee Mermaid;... elephants and ourang-outangs...

The Museum held a recruiting office for Company D. of the 22nd Massachusetts Volunteer Infantry in 1861 at the start of the Civil War.

=== Architecture ===
Hammatt Billings designed the original museum building, located at 18 Tremont Street; In 1846 Hammatt and J. E. Billings also designed the museum's next building, at 28 Tremont Street, located next door to the Massachusetts Historical Society, and close to the King's Chapel Burying Ground. The interior of the museum's 1846 building featured decoration by Ignaz Gaugengigl.

[The building] is arranged in two main portions with an area between for light and air, one communicating with the other at either end by a wide passage. The building upon Tremont Street, the front of which is of Granite in a chaste and beautiful style of Venetian Architecture, with three spacious balconies running the entire length of the building, contains on the first story, five commodious stores, and the entrance to the Museum. Above this story, the whole front building to the eaves, three stories, is occupied as a grand Corinthian Hall... containing the collection. The galleries... are supported by twenty stately columns rising from the floor.... A spacious staircase and passage-way leads to the Exhibition Hall in the rear building... capable of accommodating nearly two thousand persons.

== Images ==
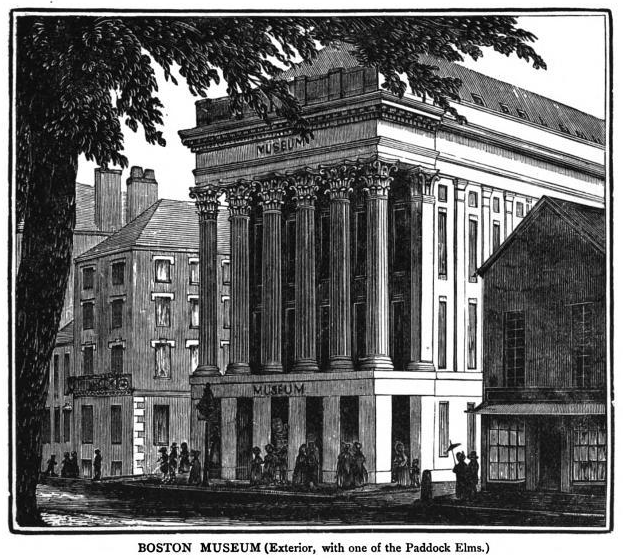
Boston Museum, no.18 Tremont St., Boston, 1841–1846

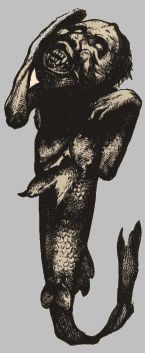
Feejee Mermaid, 1842

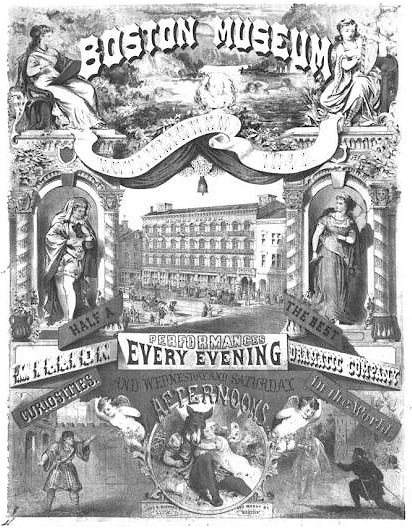
Advertisement for the Boston Museum, 19th century

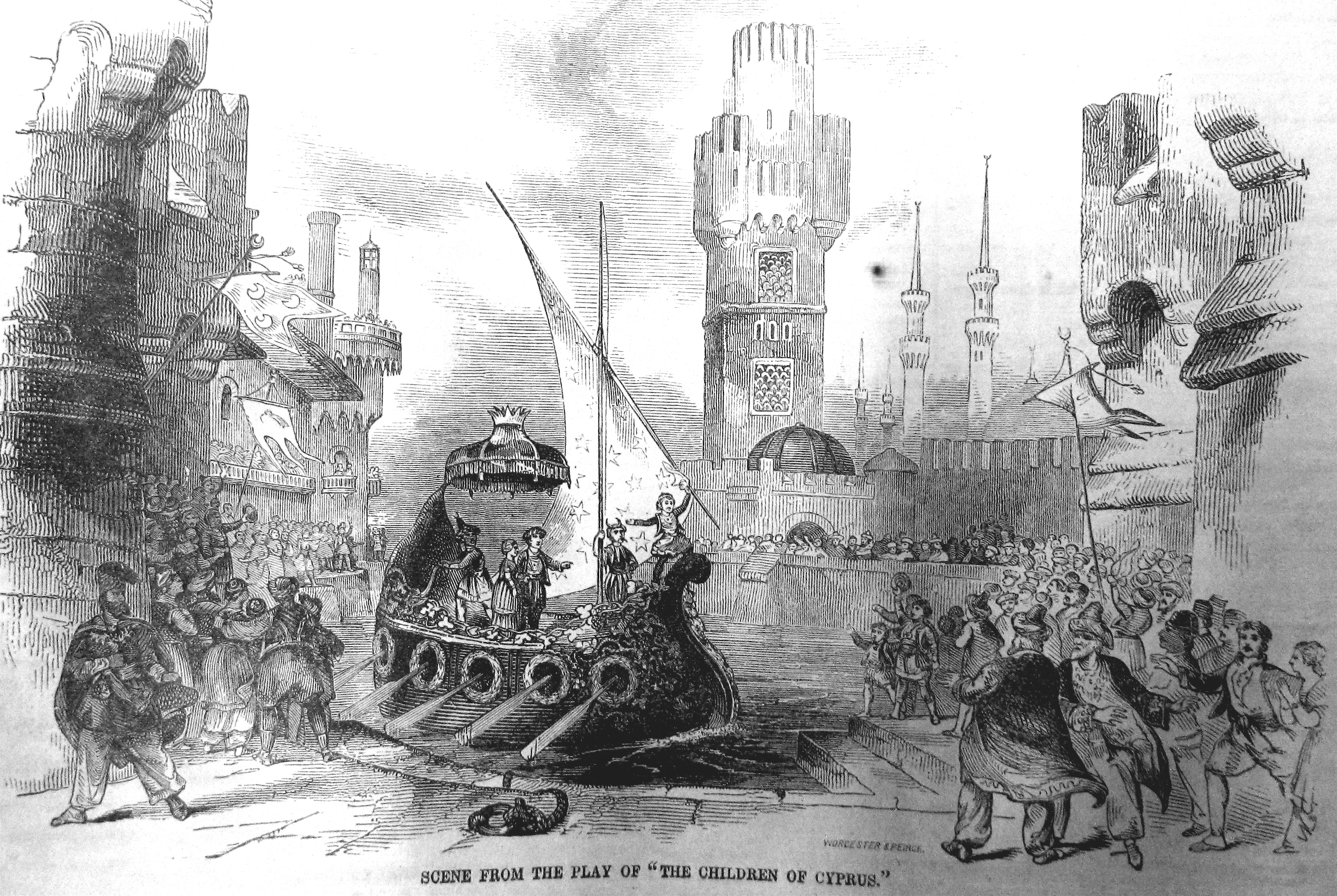
The Children of Cyprus; 1851 production

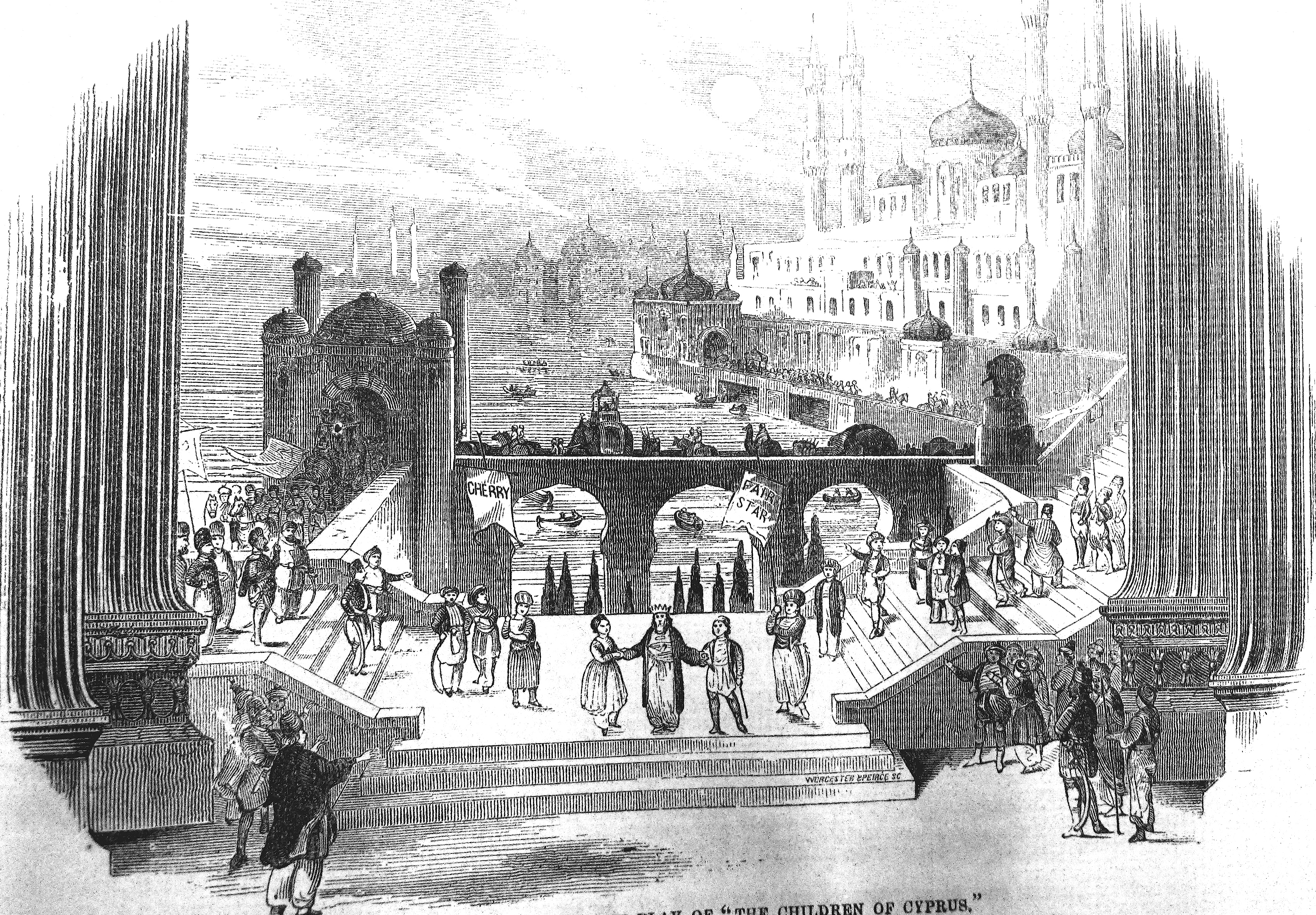
The Children of Cyprus (final act); 1851 production

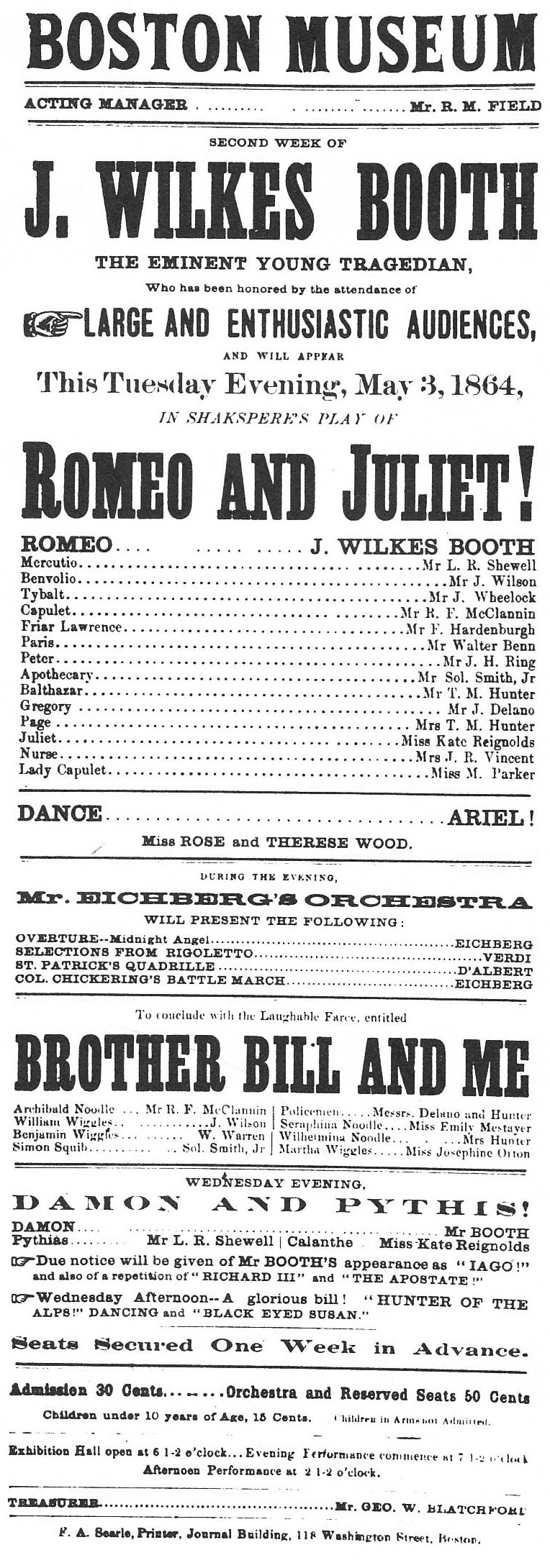
Playbill, 1864

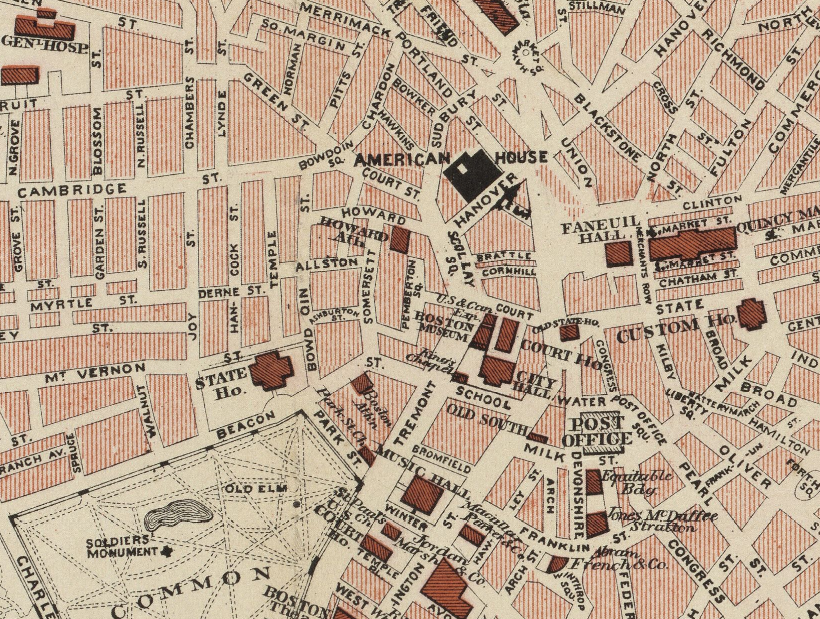
Detail of 1883 map of Boston, showing location of the Boston Museum

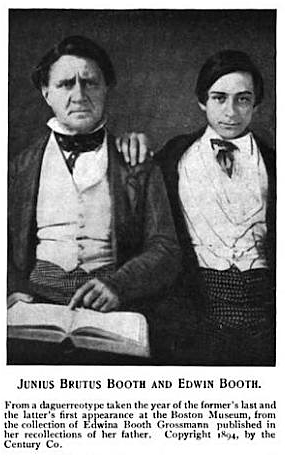
Junius Brutus Booth and Edwin Booth, 19th century

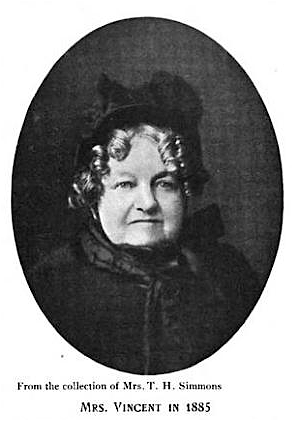
Mrs. Vincent, 1885

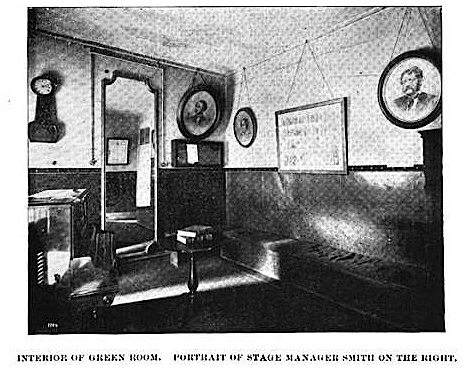
Green room, 1894

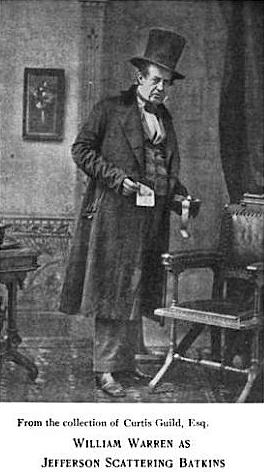
William Warren, 1903

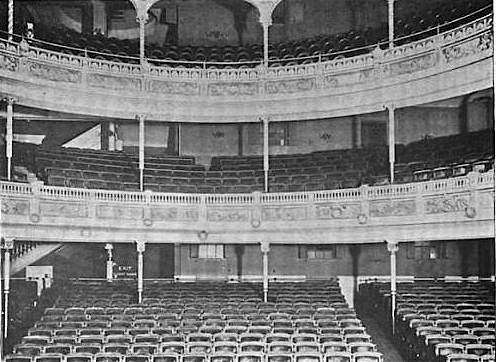
Theatre interior, ca.1903

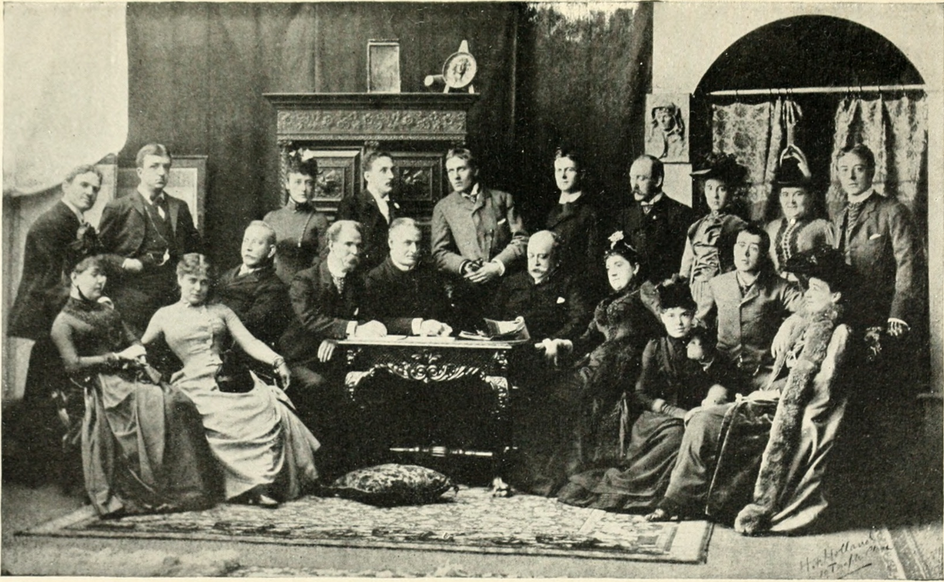
Boston Museum Stock Company, 1889–1890

=== Selected shows ===
List of shows
- The Drunkard (1844)
- Aladdin (1846)
- Sweethearts (1847)
- The Forty Thieves and the Fairy of the Lake, by Michael Kelley (1849)
- King Richard III (1849)
- Children of Cyprus (1851)
- Nature's Nobleman (1851)
- The Seven Castles (1851)
- The Enchanted Harp (1852)
- The Silver Spoon, by Joseph Stevens Jones (1852)
- Uncle Tom's Cabin (1852)
- The Jewess (1853)
- The Talisman or, The Fairy's Favor (1853)
- Hard Times (1854)
- Make Your Wills, by Edward Mayhew and G. Smith (1854)
- Peter Wilkins Or—The Flying Islanders (1854)
- The Forty Thieves (1856)
- Neighbor Jackwood (1857)
- The Sea of Ice (1857)
- Bluebeard (1860)
- Buckstone's Married Life (1861)
- Dion Boucicault's The Octaroon (1861)
- My Lord and my Lady (1861)
- Tom Taylor's Babes in the Wood (1861)
- Uncle Robert (1861)
- Lady of Lyons, by Edward Bulwer-Lytton (1862)
- The Apostate (1863)
- Romeo and Juliet (1864)
- H.M.S. Pinafore (1878)
- Dr. Jekyll and Mr. Hyde (1887)
- Agatha, by Isaac Henderson (1892)
- The Shanghraun (1892)
- Hours with Dickens (1892)
- The Prodigal Father (1893)
- Tobasco (c. 1894)
- The Widow Jones (1895)
- Little Red Riding Hood (1899)
- Mrs. Dane's Defense (1903)

=== Selected performers ===
List of performers
- Mr. & Mrs. J. W. Wallack, Jr (1850)
- Horn, Wells, and Briggs' Ethiopian Serenaders (1851)
- Mad. Radinski (1851)
- Mr. C. D. Pitt. (1851)
- Mrs. Barrett (1851)
- Annetta Galletti (1852)
- Henry Sedley (1852)
- Julia Bennett (1852)
- Caroline Richings and Mr. Peter Richings (1853)
- Lysander Thompson (1853)
- Miss Eliza Logan (1853)
- Agnes Robertson (1854)
- Annette Ince (1854)
- Miss E. Raymond (1854)
- Louisa Howard and Mr. H. Farren (1855)
- Mr. Geo. Jamison (1855)
- Mrs. Annie Senter (1855)
- E. F. Keach (1856)
- James Bennett (1856)
- Mrs Farren (1856)
- Annie Senter (1857)
- Mr & Mrs E. L. Davenport (1857)
- Mr. J. W. Wallack, Jr. (1857)
- Mrs. W. C. Gladstane (1857)
- Mrs. D. P. Bowers (1857)
- Mr. L. P. Barrett (1858)
- Virginia Cunningham (1858)
- Cooper Opera Troupe (1860)
- H. C. Cooper. (1860)
- Kate Reignolds (1860)
- Miss Joey Gougenheim (1860)
- Charles Dillon (1861)
- Emma Waller (1861)
- Mr. C. W. Couldock (1861)
- Mr. Sothern (1861)
- Charlotte Thompson (1862)
- Edwin Adams (1862)
- Fox's Ravel Troupe (1862)
- Matilda Heron (1862)
- Miss Bateman (1862)
- John Wilkes Booth (1863)
- Mary Frances Scott-Siddons (1868)
- Walter Montgomery (1871)
- Howard Gould (1882-?)
- Evelyn Campbell (1889–90)
- Miriam O'Leary (1889–90)
