= Department of Obstetrics and Gynecology (Massachusetts General Hospital) =

The Department of Obstetrics and Gynecology at Massachusetts General Hospital (also called the Vincent Department of Obstetrics and Gynecology) is an arm of Massachusetts General Hospital. It was formerly an independent entity, Vincent Memorial Hospital, before being absorbed into Massachusetts General Hospital. The name "Vincent Memorial Hospital" remains the name of a charity dedicated to supporting the department.

== Vincent Memorial Hospital ==
The Vincent Memorial Hospital was founded in 1890 to memorialise Boston actress Mary Ann Vincent. The hospital was formally opened on April 6, 1891, by Bishop Phillips Brooks as a hospital for wage-earning women and girls.

Initially, the hospital was dedicated to caring for sick and indigent women. When it first opened, it was located at 44 Chambers Street in the West End of Boston, near the Massachusetts General Hospital, but it outgrew its initial ten-bed capacity and moved in 1908 to larger premises on South Huntington Avenue, where it remained until 1940.

== As part of Massachusetts General Hospital ==
In 1940, the Vincent Memorial Hospital agreed to merge into Massachusetts General Hospital, becoming its gynecology service while retaining its own hospital identity, staff, and independent corporate status. In 1988, the Vincent Memorial Hospital gave up its independent hospital license, but continues to retain its corporate identity, board of directors, and separate endowment. Isaac Schiff was made head of the department in 1988 and served in that post until 2015, being replaced by Jeffrey Ecker.

Among the many achievements of the department are pioneering the routine use of the pap smear and discovering the cause of cancers in "DES daughters".

In June 1995, the Vincent Center for Reproductive Biology was created as a research arm of the department.

== The Vincent Club ==
The Vincent Club is an exclusive private women's social and charity organization founded in Boston in 1892 to support the Vincent Memorial Hospital. The club continues to support the Vincent Department of Obstetrics & Gynecology, staging an annual Spring Gala charity event and other fundraising activities benefiting the department, and organizing educational forums.

The Vincent Club was namechecked in "Harvard Blues" by the Count Basie Orchestra ("I love my Vincent baby, and that's no Harvard lie").
