= Miriam O'Leary Collins =

American stage actor

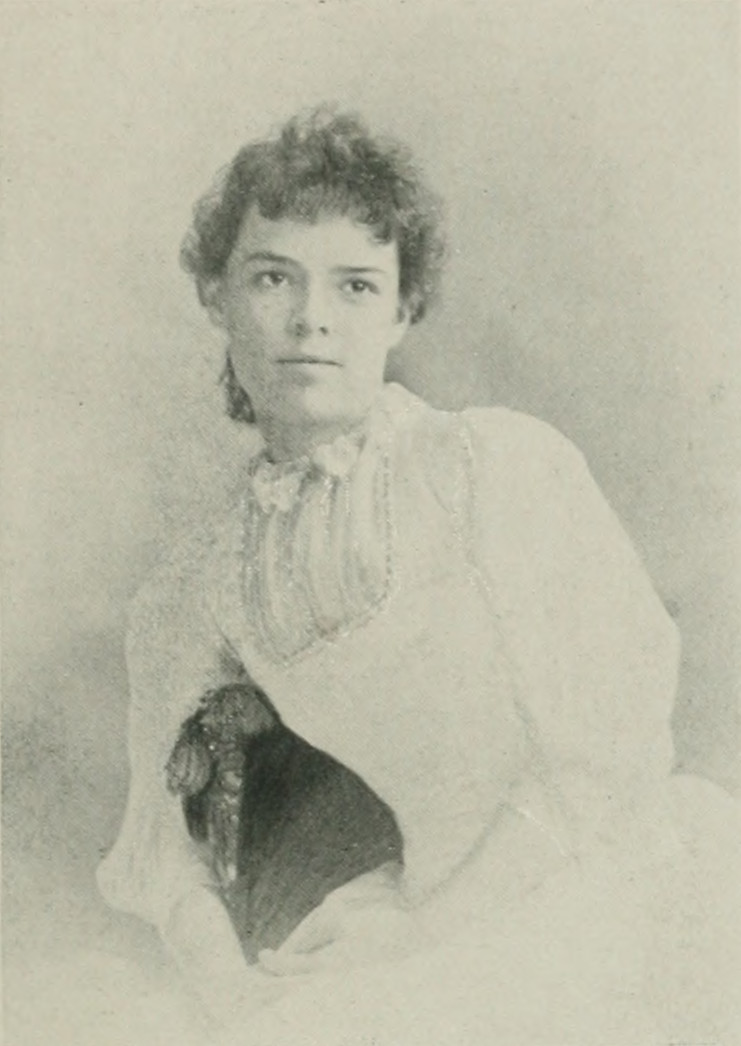
- "A Woman of the Century"
- Born: Miriam O'Leary; July 2, 1861; Boston, Massachusetts, U.S.
- Died: June 2, 1936; Marblehead, Massachusetts, U.S.
- Resting place: Old Calvary Cemetery, West Roxbury, Massachusetts, U.S.
- Occupation: stage actor
- Employer: Boston Museum theatre stock company
- Spouse: David Aloysius Collins (m. 1892; died 1907)
- Children: 6

Miriam O'Leary Collins (July 2, 1861 – June 2, 1936) was an American stage actor associated with Boston Museum theatre. After marriage, she staged plays, several times for the benefit of the Home for Destitute Catholic Children. She also worked as a elocution and dramatic action coach.

== Early life and education ==
Miriam O'Leary was born in Boston, Massachusetts, July 2, 1861. (Note: According to Willard & Livermore, Miriam O'Leary was born in 1864.) Her father, William Curran O'Leary, of London, England, was an artist and designer by profession. Her mother's maiden name was Miriam Keating, and at the time of her marriage she was on a visit to Boston from Halifax, her native place, Their daughter, Miriam, was their first child. Her siblings were William, Teresa and Agnes.

Collins received her education in the public schools of Boston, and attended the Franklin grammar school, the Winthrop Grammar School and the Girls' High School. Her aim throughout her years of preparation was to fit herself as a teacher.

== Career ==
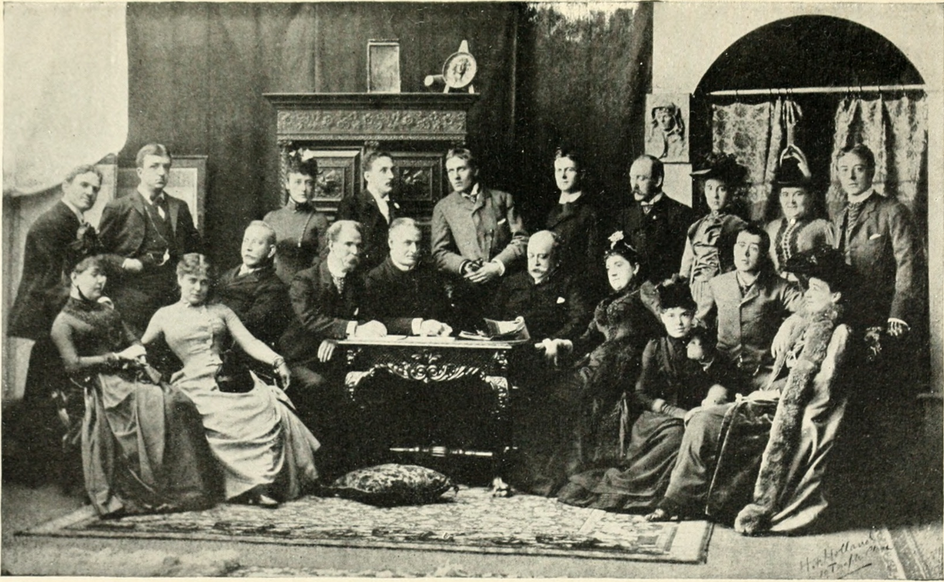
The Boston Museum Stock Company, 1889-1890. O'Leary is seated, third from the right.

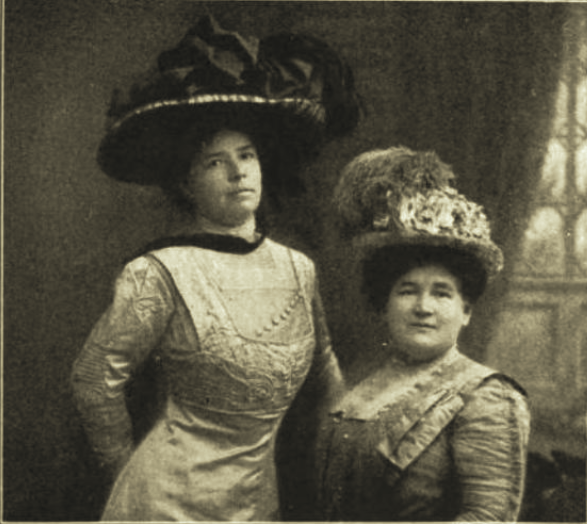
Miriam O'Leary and Kate Ryan

After her father's death, encouraged by her cousin, Joseph Haworth, and by other friends, she chose stage acting as her profession and began at once to pursue that goal. Her first success was as Rosalie in Rosedale by Lester Wallack during the playwright's engagement in the Boston Museum theatre. She spent one season in the company of Edwin Booth and Lawrence Barrett, after which she returned to the Boston Museum. In 1892, she was a member of the stock company of that theater. She appeared in many widely different roles, ranging from Snake in Nicholas Nickleby, Topsy in Uncle Tom's Cabin, and Sophia in The Road to Ruin, to Jess in Lady Jess. She appeared in The Shaughraun at the Boston Museum in January 1883.

In 1895, O'Leary-Collins put on the play Cricket on the Hearth at Boston College hall for the benefit of the Home for Destitute Catholic Children; she was also a cast member. Later in the same year, with Prof. George W. Blish, she read she trial scene of Bardell vs. Pickwick at the All-Around-Dickens club.

In February 1896, in aid of the Home for Destitute Catholic Children and under the patronage of the Ladies' Aide Society, O'Leary-Collins staged the play, Rosedale. She appeared in Dr Deborah in 1898 at the Hollis Street Theater for the benefit of the same Home.

By 1907, Collins had shifted her career to coaching elocution and dramatic action. She also directed The Shaughraun at Potter Hall in January 1908.

== Personal life ==
On January 25, 1892, she married David Aloysius Collins (1862-1907), a prominent physician of Boston. They had six children: David, Miriam, William, Lucius, Frederick, and Leon.

Miriam O'Leary Collins died in Marblehead, Massachusetts, June 2, 1936, and was buried at Old Calvary Cemetery, West Roxbury.
