= Mary Ann Vincent =

American actress

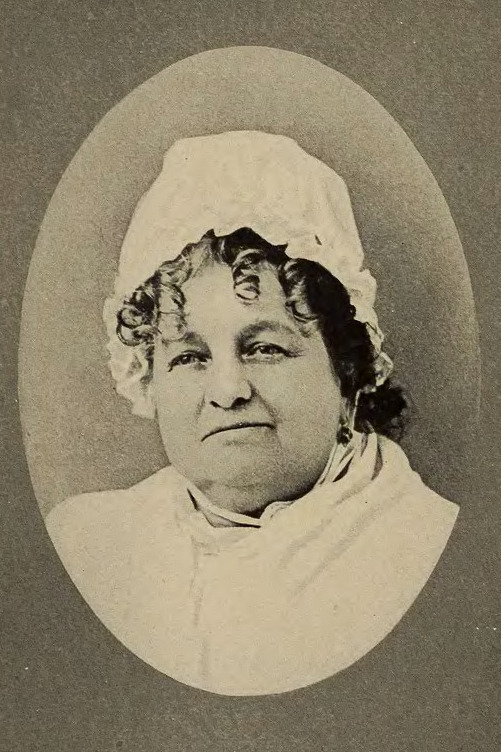
- Born: September 18, 1818; Portsmouth
- Died: September 4, 1887; Boston
- Occupation: Stage actor

Mary Ann Vincent (September 18, 1818 – September 4, 1887) was a British born American actress.

== Biography ==
Mary Ann Vincent was born in Portsmouth, England on September 18, 1818, the daughter of an Irishman named Farlin. Left an orphan at an early age, she turned to the stage, making her first appearance in 1834 as Lucy in The Review, at Cowes, Isle of Wight. The next year she married James R. Vincent (who died in 1850), an actor with whom she toured England and Ireland for several years.

In 1846, the then Mrs Vincent went to America to join the stock company of the old National Theatre in Boston, where she became a great favourite. The National Theatre burned in 1852, and thenceforth, until her death, on September 4, 1887, Mrs. Vincent was connected with the company at the Boston Museum.

== Vincent Memorial Hospital ==
Her memory is still honoured by the Vincent Memorial Hospital, founded in Boston in 1890 by popular subscription, and which was formally opened on April 6, 1891, by Bishop Phillips Brooks, as a hospital for wage-earning women and girls. The hospital is now part of Massachusetts General Hospital.
