= Howard Gould (actor) =

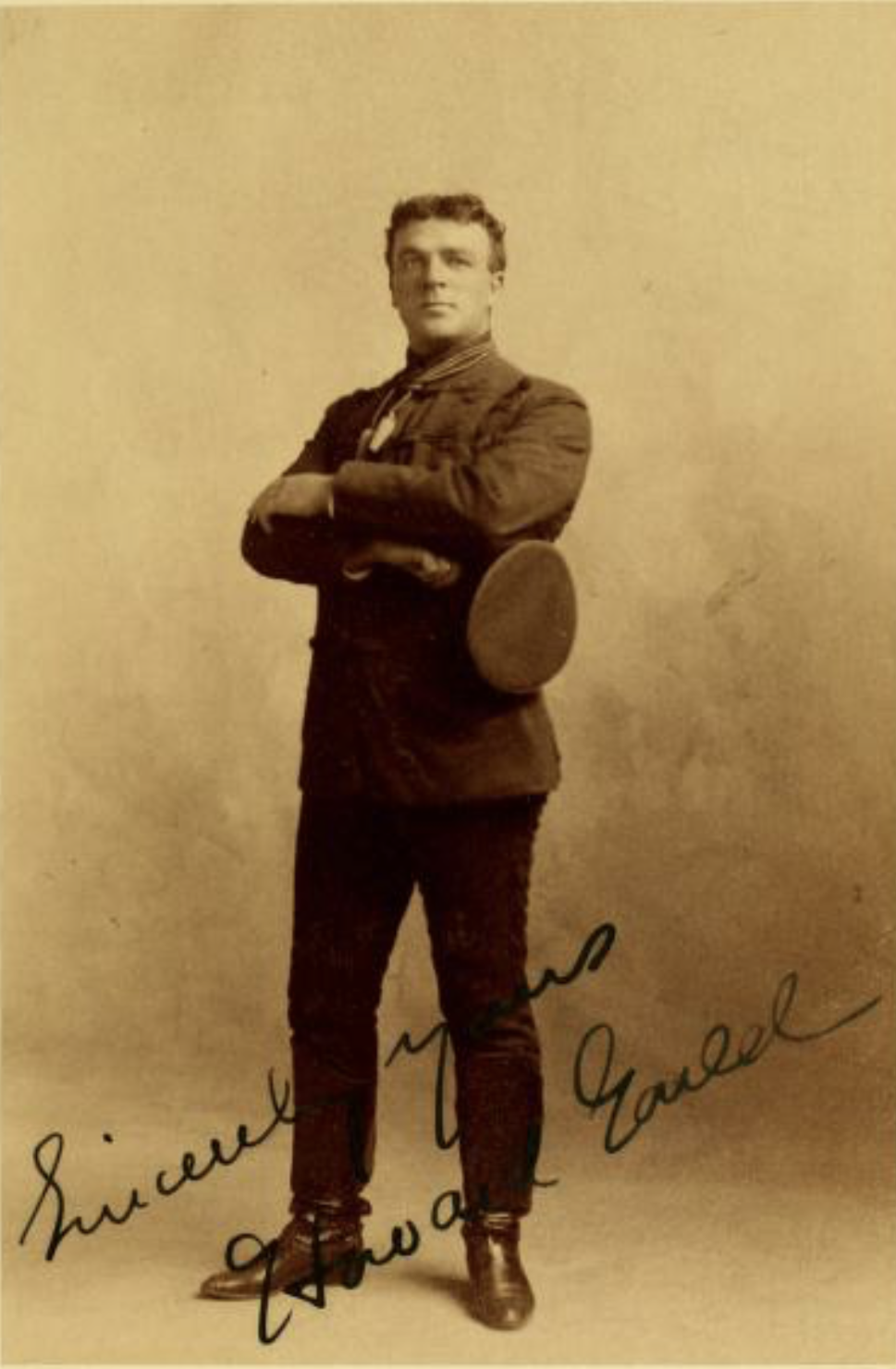
Howard Gould

Howard Gould (March 19, 1863 - February 3, 1938) was an American actor who had a lengthy stage career in Boston from 1882 until his retirement in 1922. He also appeared in several Broadway production on the New York stage.

== Life and career ==
The son of Hiram W. Gould and Elizabeth Libby Gould, Howard Gould was born on March 19, 1863 in what was St. Anthony, Minnesota and is now Minneapolis. He was educated in Boston, Massachusetts at the Brimmer School and The English High School. He married Lena M. Bugbee in Boston in 1882, and that same year made his debut at the Boston Theatre as the Commissioner in Paul Merritt's The World. He had a long career as a leading actor at the Boston Museum, and retired from the stage in 1922.

Gould also worked periodically on Broadway. Some of his roles on the New York stage included Phoebus in Paul M. Potter's Notre Dame (1902, Daly's Theatre), Monks in J. Comyns Carr's Oliver Twist (1912, New Amsterdam Theatre), Henry Kendall in William LeBaron's Nobody's Money 1921, Longacre Theatre), Walter Harvey in Owen Davis's Home Fires (1923, 39th Street Theatre, and Colonel Henri Petain in Donald Heywood's Africana (1934, Venice Theatre).

Gould died in Winthrop, Massachusetts on February 3, 1938.
