= Jonathan Harrington =

American ventriloquist and illusionist

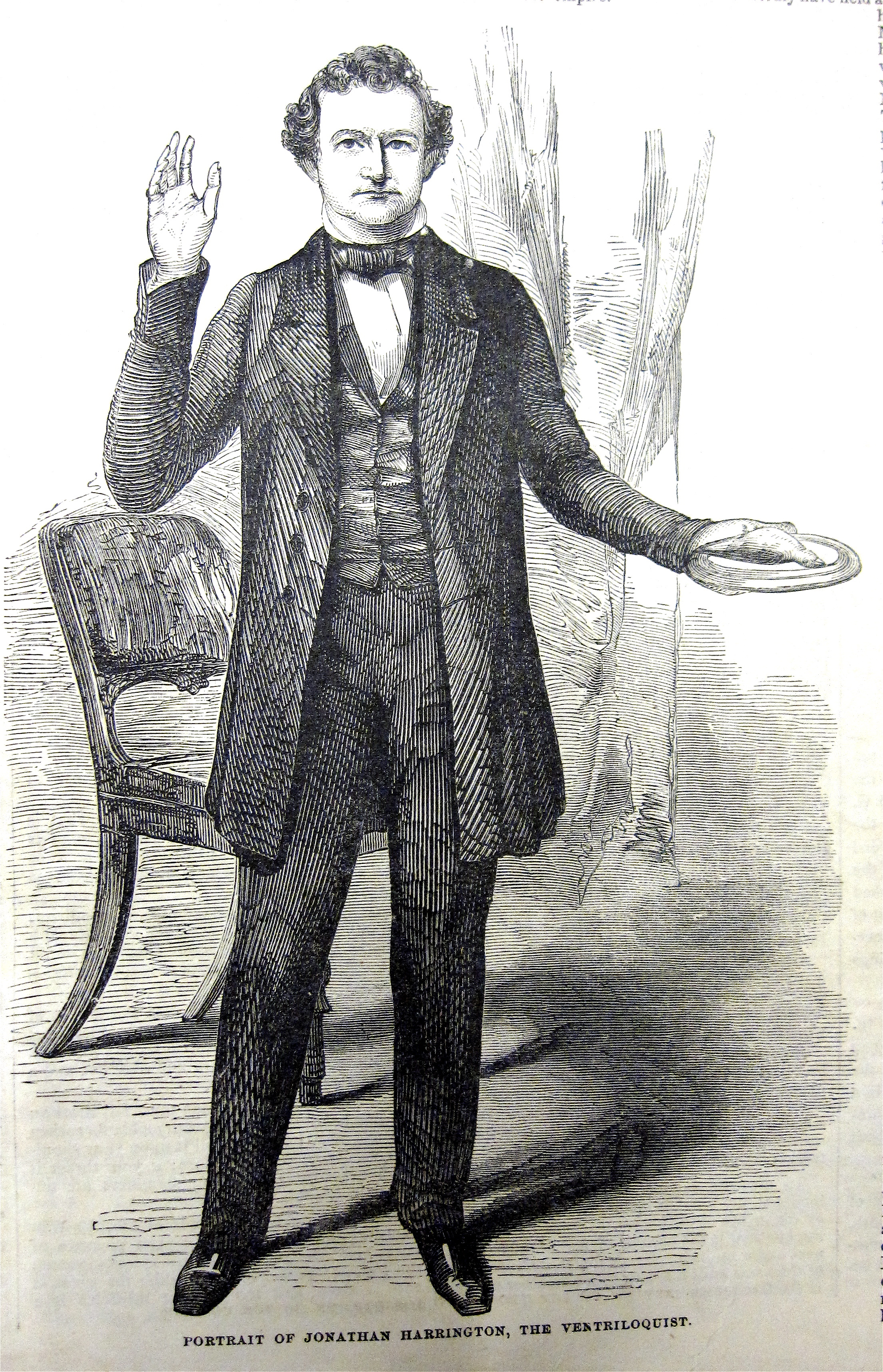
Jonathan Harrington, 1852

Jonathan Harrington (c. 1811–1881) was an American ventriloquist and illusionist. He performed in Boston, Philadelphia, and elsewhere.

== Biography ==
Harrington appeared in Boston in 1831, "astonishing Bostonians with ventriloquism at Concert Hall."

In 1834, he performed at Boston's Federal Street Theatre. Around that time he is described as a "professor of ventriloquism and natural magic, the same gentleman who still continues to appear at different periods of the year in this and the surrounding cities, making short excursions, returning to his snug and quiet home at North Chelsea."

Harrington performed at the American Museum in Philadelphia 1836–1838, "with his automaton fortune teller."

In 1840, Harrington engaged in business maneuvers in Boston related to the dismantling of E.A. Greenwood's New-England Museum collection and of Moses Kimball's interest therein. Accounts vary. According to one recollection, Harrington "established a museum in the rooms previously occupied as the New England Museum, on Court Street, with the principal part of a Philadelphia museum. ... But failing to meet with a suitable support, [it] was sold by an auctioneer's hammer, at a great sacrifice, in 1842." Sculptor Thomas Ball, who knew the relevant parties, tells the story in his memoirs, and adds intrigue and competition to the mix. He suggests that Harrington tried to outmaneuver Kimball, but in the end was unable to prevail.

In April 1843, his performance at the Lowell Museum in Lowell, Massachusetts, and was advertised in the Lowell Courier newspaper promising:

Mr. Harrington of Boston "The original, well-known, and justly celebrated Ventriloquist, and Professor of Ledgerdemain". Laughable, Comical, Quisical, Mysterious, Magical, Wonderful, Astonishing Experiments of Ventriloquism, Imitations, etc, etc, etc." Tickets admitting two persons were 25 cents and the performance began at 8 PM.

Harrington appeared again at Philadelphia's American Museum in 1845, "performing his illusions;" and at Boston's National Theatre in 1848.

Harrington performed at Barnum's Aquarial Gardens in 1861 (pre-Barnum) and 1862.

Associates included writer Sylvanus Cobb, Jr.
