= Barnum's Aquarial Gardens =

- Date opened: June 1862
- Date closed: February 1863
- Location: Boston, Massachusetts, USA

Barnum's Aquarial Gardens (June 1862 – February 1863) in Boston, Massachusetts, United States, was a public aquarium, zoo, and performance space located on Washington Street in the Financial District. P.T. Barnum bought the Boston Aquarial and Zoological Gardens in 1862, remodelled the space, changed the name of the business, and re-opened the collections to the public in June. In contrast to its earlier incarnation, the place became more of a show-hall than a serious scientific establishment. "Madame Lanista", who wrestled with snakes, was a typical attraction of this period. Other exhibits included a dog show and a baby show, as well as dramatic performances, which were given from Dec. 16, 1862, until the venue was closed on Feb. 14, 1863. After the Gardens were closed, their contents were moved to Barnum's American Museum in New York. Most of the exhibits were destroyed when the American Museum burned down in 1865.

== Performances/Exhibits ==
- June 1862 - Dog show
- July 1862 - "Baby show" ("fine and fancy specimens of infantile humanity")
- August 1862 - "Jonathan Harrington" August 26 through September 1 (Harrington also performed in this venue in 1861)
- Sept. 1862 - "Gen. Tom Thumb and Commodore Nutt" ("two rival pigmies")
- "Miss Dora Dawron, the double voiced singer ... in unique costume representing half man and half woman"
- "Miss Leone, attired as Venus, in her nautilus shell boat ... [drives] the whale around the great central tank"
- Albino Family

== See also ==
- Boston Aquarial and Zoological Gardens
