= Combat Zone, Boston =

1960s adult entertainment district in Boston, Massachusetts

Coordinates: 42.3515°N 71.0628°W

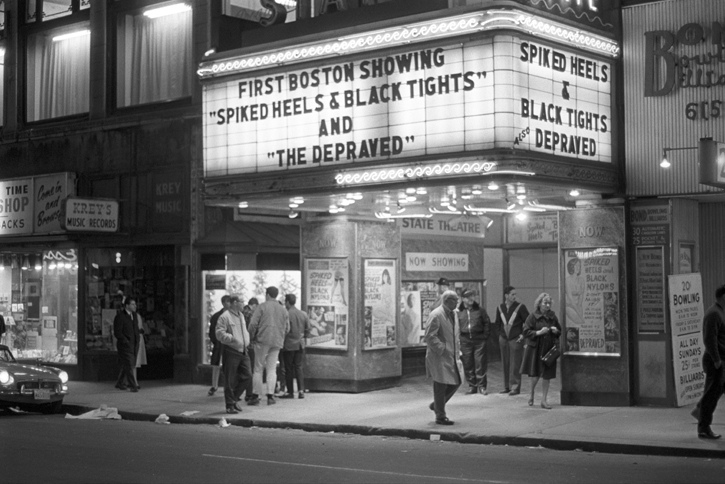
The State Theatre, 1967 by Nick DeWolf

"Combat Zone" was the name given in the 1960s to the adult entertainment district in downtown Boston, Massachusetts. Centered on Washington Street between Boylston Street and Kneeland Street, the area was once the site of many strip clubs, peep shows, X-rated movie theaters, and adult bookstores. It had a reputation for crime, including prostitution.

In 1974, in an attempt to contain the spread of adult businesses, the Boston Redevelopment Authority officially designated the Combat Zone as the city's adult entertainment district. For a variety of reasons, such as rising property values and the introduction of home video technology, most of the adult businesses in the area have since closed, and the "Combat Zone" moniker has become obsolete.

== Etymology ==
The name "Combat Zone" was popularized through a series of exposé articles on the area Jean Cole wrote for the Boston Daily Record in the 1960s. The moniker described an area that resembled a war zone both because of its well-known crime and violence, and because many soldiers and sailors on shore leave from the Charlestown (Boston) Navy Yard frequented the many strip clubs and brothels while in uniform.

== History ==
The Combat Zone began to form in the early 1960s, when city officials razed the West End and former red light district at Scollay Square, near Faneuil Hall, to build the Government Center urban renewal project. Displaced Scollay Square denizens relocated to the lower Washington Street area because it was only half a mile away, the rents were low, and the residents of nearby Chinatown lacked the political power to keep them out. Originally, there was an attempt to name the area Liberty Tree Neighborhood after the Liberty Tree that once stood in the area, but the name did not catch on.

Lower Washington Street was already part of Boston's entertainment district with a number of movie theaters, bars, delicatessens, and restaurants that catered to night life. It was located between the classic, studio-built movie palaces such as the RKO Keith's and Paramount theatres and the stage theatres such as the Colonial on Boylston Street. With the closing of the burlesque theatres in Scollay Square, many of the bars began to feature go-go dancers and, later, nude dancers. During the 1970s, when laws against obscenity were relaxed, many of the cinemas then screening second-run films began screening adult movies.

=== Peak years: Mid-1960s – late 1970s ===
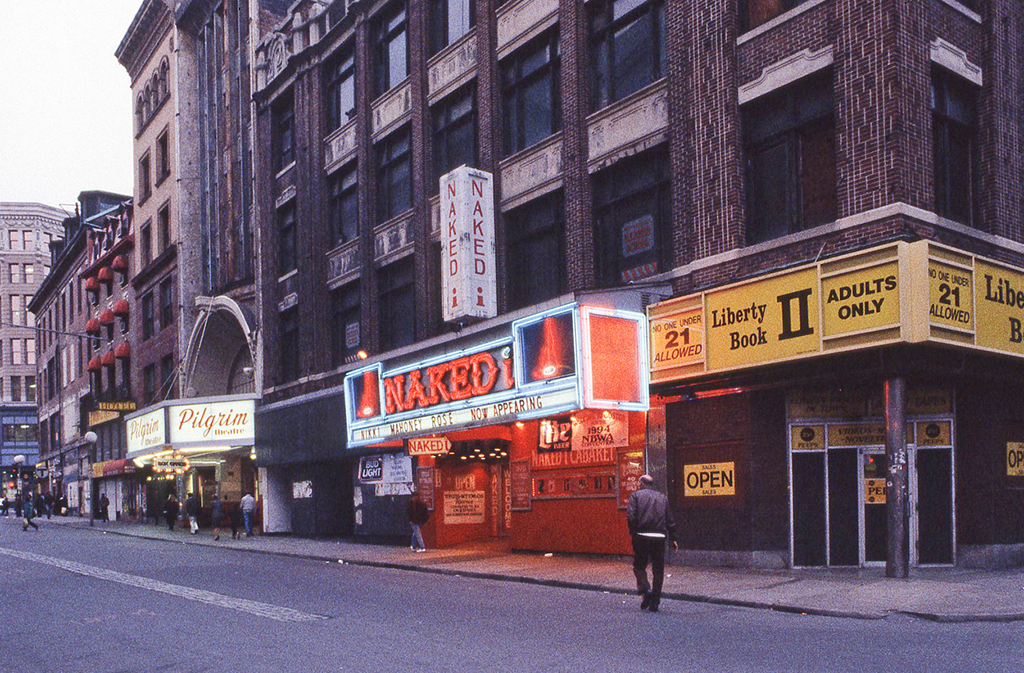
The Naked i, one of the Combat Zone's larger strip clubs

During the Combat Zone's heyday, some of the larger strip clubs were Naked i Cabaret (famous for its animated neon sign which superimposed an eye over a woman's crotch), Club 66, the Teddy Bear Lounge, and the Two O'Clock Club. Besides the strip clubs and X-rated movie theaters, numerous peep shows and adult bookstores lined most of Washington Street between Boylston Street and Kneeland Street. In 1976, The Wall Street Journal called the area "a sexual Disneyland".

The prevailing attitude towards homosexuality at the time was one of intolerance. Lower Washington Street, by contrast, was known for many years as the "Gay Times Square". As the area changed, that nickname fell out of circulation, but the Combat Zone's relatively open atmosphere still attracted many LGBT people. Popular gathering spots included the Playland Café on Essex Street, the Stuart Theater on Washington Street, and many others. Nearby Park Square and Bay Village were home to several gay and drag bars, such as the Punch Bowl and Jacques Cabaret.

The Combat Zone's detractors often grouped homosexuals, transvestites, prostitutes, strippers, purveyors of adult books and films, and drug dealers together under an umbrella of perceived immorality. Jeremiah Murphy wrote in a 1973 Boston Globe article about the Combat Zone, "Now it is almost 3 a.m. and the gay bars have closed and the fags and hookers and pimps and pushers roam the streets." In a 1974 Boston Herald article, representatives of the Sack Theater Chain called the Combat Zone "Satan's playground" and "a malignancy comprised of pimps, prostitutes, erotica, and merchants of immorality" whose growth had to be removed. As late as 1984 the Globe was referring to certain theaters in the Zone as "notorious gathering places for homosexuals".

The Combat Zone was also recognized as being racially diverse at a time when other Boston neighborhoods were relatively segregated. In his memoir, Jonathan Tudan recalls the tension in his Tremont Street building over news of an impending police raid in 1969. Along with the drug dealers and prostitutes, he writes, "mixed-race couples shacking up have begun to nervously doubt their freedom."

=== Prostitution ===
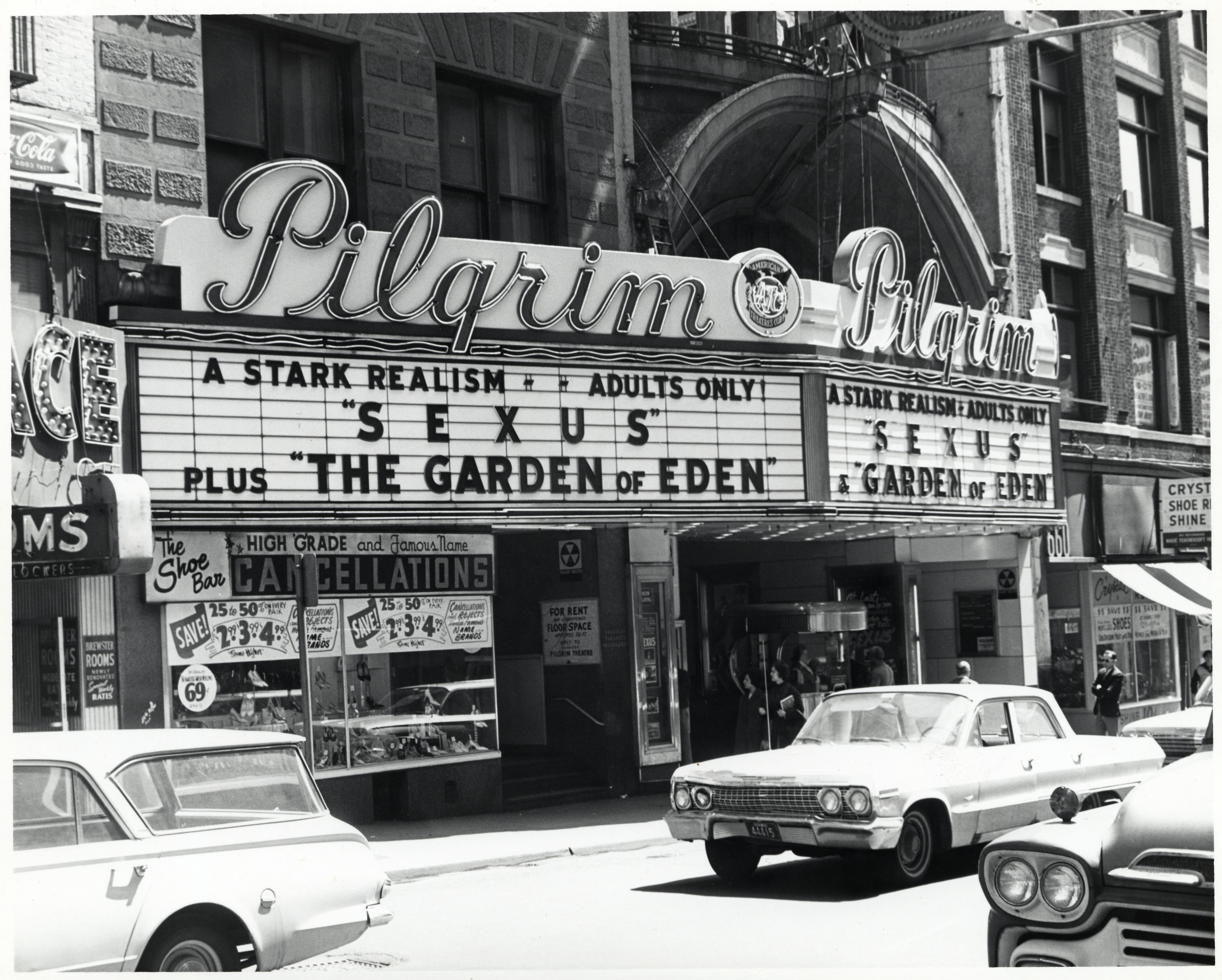
The Pilgrim Theater, 1960s. City Censor, City of Boston

LaGrange Street, a small one-way street which runs between Washington and Tremont Streets, was the principal gathering spot for street prostitutes. Most congregated near "Good Time Charlie's" at 25 LaGrange Street. The Pilgrim Theater, one of the last old time burlesque houses, was the site of a political scandal in December 1974 when the Chairman of the House Ways and Means Committee, Wilbur Mills, a Democrat, seemingly inebriated, appeared on stage with stripper Fanne Foxe, "The Argentine Firecracker". The Pilgrim then ceased to feature live shows, instead focusing on X-rated movies, and became a cruising site for men to have (paid or unpaid) sex with men.

State Representative Barney Frank made a name for himself in the mid-1970s as a political defender of the Combat Zone. Frank took a libertarian view on vice, bucking the consensus that the area needed to be "cleaned up". At the same time he wanted to prevent the Zone's adult businesses from spreading into the affluent Beacon Hill and Back Bay neighborhoods where they might disturb his constituents. In 1975, with the support of Boston Police Commissioner Robert DiGrazia, Frank introduced a bill that would have legalized the sex-for-hire business but kept it quarantined in a red light district, which would be moved to Boston's Financial District. The Financial District was not populated at night, unlike the areas abutting the Combat Zone.

The Combat Zone had other supporters. Boston Mayor Kevin White was in favor of allowing adult businesses to operate within defined boundaries, as was conservative pundit William F. Buckley Jr. In 1975, White made headlines when he made an unannounced tour of the Combat Zone, visiting several establishments where he went largely unrecognized. When approached by a prostitute on LaGrange Street, White replied, "Thank you, I'm too old."

Many Combat Zone prostitutes, both male and female, were minors. In 1975, 97 girls under the age of 17 were arrested in the Combat Zone for prostitution. A spokesperson for the Boston Police Department called that "the tip of the iceberg", explaining that minors were more often charged with being a Child in Need of Services. Audrey Morrissey, a former underage Combat Zone prostitute who went on to become the associate director of a victims' service agency, recalled that in her day, underage prostitutes were held responsible for what would now be considered a crime against them, while johns were rarely arrested.

=== Other crime ===
The Combat Zone had a reputation for violent crime which, while not unfounded, was sensationalized by the press. In April 1975, Police Superintendent Joseph M. Jordan (who later became the Commissioner) told reporters that Boston's most "troublesome" police districts were Districts 2 (Roxbury), 3 (Mattapan) and 4 (Back Bay/South End). The Combat Zone was in District 1.

Street crime in the Combat Zone was commonly attributed to the blighting influence of adult businesses, despite the fact that the area had been a skid row before their arrival. As a 1977 Time magazine article put it, "Violence has followed the vice." Newspaper reporters routinely suggested that adult businesses in the Combat Zone were connected to organized crime. Although those rumors were largely unsubstantiated, at least one establishment did have such a connection: Jay's Lounge on Tremont Street, owned by mob boss Gennaro Angiulo. The murder of Andrew Puopolo in the Combat Zone, in November 1976, led to Commonwealth v. Soares, the seminal Massachusetts Supreme Judicial Court case barring racial discrimination in jury selection.

The area also had a problem with police corruption, according to a 1976 Special Investigations Unit report on Police District One. The report alleged that "a direct relationship existed between ... the highest ranking member of the District One command staff and the Angiulo family during the period in question ... the unusual police service attending the Angiulo funeral can only be explained as an act of respect and fealty to an organized crime overlord by the deputy superintendent." According to the report, officers ignored organized crime and confined themselves to arresting low-level offenders such as street bookies, prostitutes, and drug users. District One was allegedly the center of a major gambling syndicate, but officers who worked there refused to investigate, fearing reprisal by their superiors. The Combat Zone was also reputedly a center for illegal gun sales.

Another controversial practice that was common in the Combat Zone was drink solicitation. In violation of Boston's "mingling" regulations, dancers and hostesses at some bars were paid to socialize with customers and encourage them to buy drinks. Bars were occasionally raided and shut down for "B-girl activity".

=== Zoning ===
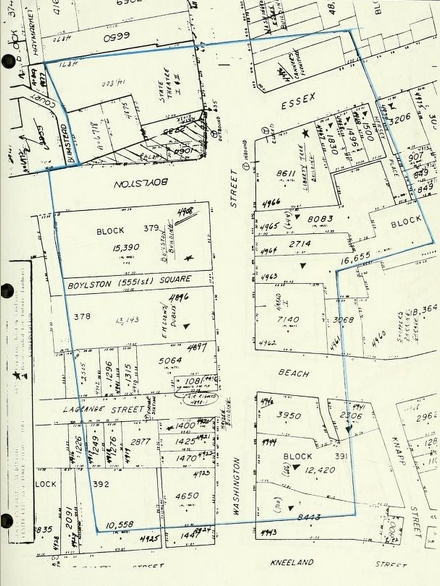
1974 zoning map of Boston's adult entertainment district. Boston Redevelopment Authority

In 1974, when the Massachusetts Supreme Judicial Court declared the state's obscenity laws unconstitutional, city officials feared that Boston was about to become a "mecca of pornography". The Boston Redevelopment Authority tried to contain the spread of adult businesses by designating the Combat Zone as the official adult entertainment district. This district was exempted from the usual ban on flashing neon signs. At the same time, the BRA made ambitious plans to improve the area's aesthetics. That year, funding was approved for Liberty Tree Park, a small park near the site of the historic Liberty Tree, as "the first step in improving the Combat Zone."

Boston was the first American city to establish a specific zone for adult entertainment. Most cities, such as Detroit, used zoning regulations to disperse adult businesses and prevent them from forming a district.

Although adult entertainment was confined to the Combat Zone, buildings in the Combat Zone were not used exclusively for that purpose. Residents lived in furnished apartments, single-room-occupancy hotels (SROs), homeless shelters, and a retired merchant marines' home. Urban renewal plans tended to overlook these residents, and the buildings were eventually demolished or converted to other uses. Saint Francis House on Boylston Street, a daytime shelter for the homeless, is still in operation.

=== Demise ===
The Combat Zone's demise can be attributed to a number of factors. Among them are the rising property values that made the downtown locations more attractive to real estate developers, the closure of the Charlestown (Boston) Navy Yard, the spread of AIDS, and the introduction of home video and the Internet, which made it possible to view adult movies and other erotica at home without going to a red light district.

Another factor was the city's ambivalence towards the area: despite the BRA's plans to improve the Combat Zone, the area suffered from municipal neglect. Throughout the mid-1970s, the city neglected the Zone's streetlights, policing, and garbage pickup, fostering an atmosphere of urban blight and criminality. Street prostitutes became bolder, often picking pockets and robbing passersby. In 1976, just before leaving office, Police Commissioner Robert DiGrazia released a 572-page Special Investigations Unit report to the press documenting widespread police corruption, neglect, and brutality in the Zone. Just two weeks later, the highly publicized murder of the Harvard football player Andrew Puopolo focused attention on crime in the area.

Years of grassroots activism by neighboring Chinatown residents, aggressive police work, use of bureaucratic procedures to discourage adult businesses, and massive urban renewal projects instigated by the BRA have helped to stem crime and close most of the adult businesses. All that remains of the former Combat Zone are two small strip clubs, Centerfolds and the Glass Slipper, along LaGrange Street, and a few adult book and video stores on Washington and Kneeland streets. Street prostitution has moved to other parts of town.

A new Emerson College dormitory (and eventual relocation of the entire campus), Suffolk University administrative offices, a relocated branch of the Massachusetts Registry of Motor Vehicles, a new $300 million development which includes a Ritz-Carlton Hotel and a Loews cinema, and a renovated Boston Opera House all opened in the area in the late 1990s and early 2000s. In 2006 a luxury apartment tower, the Archstone Boston Common, was erected at the corner of Washington and Beach streets. The historic Hayden Building on Washington Street, once home to an adult movie theater and a gay bathhouse, was renovated in 2013 and now houses luxury apartments and retail space.

== Notable performers ==
Chesty Morgan, an exotic dancer known for her 73-inch bust, regularly performed at the Pilgrim Theater. In August 1974, the theater's owner claimed, "She was like a god out of the heavens for us. She saved the theater and I hope she can do it again."

Princess Cheyenne, another celebrated exotic dancer, performed at the Naked i in the 1970s and 1980s.

Sylvia Sidney, "Boston's most (in)famous drag queen", regularly performed at clubs in the Combat Zone. Sidney was named for the actress Sylvia Sidney.

Comedian Jay Leno got his start doing stand-up in the Two O'Clock Club and the Teddy Bare Lounge in the Combat Zone.

Jazz musicians Sabby Lewis, Dick Wetmore, and Bull Moose Jackson played regularly at the Gilded Cage on Boylston Street in the 1960s. The Gilded Cage was destroyed in 1966 when a leaking gas main exploded in the nearby Paramount Hotel, causing a five-alarm fire that killed 11 people.

Before the demolition of Scollay Square, there was already at least one strip bar in what would later become known as the Combat Zone: Izzy Ort's Bar & Grille at 25 Essex Street. Many notable jazz musicians played there in the 1940s and early 1950s, including Quincy Jones, Ruby Braff, Sam Rivers, Herb Pomeroy, and others. Entertainer Sammy Davis Jr. sang and danced there when he lived in Boston.

The Silver Dollar Bar, which later became the Two O'Clock, was Frank O'Hara's favorite bar when he studied at Harvard. Like Izzy Ort's, it was a live music venue as well as a popular hangout for sailors. Among others, George Wein, Nat Pierce, Ray Perry, and Fat Man Robinson played there.

== In art and popular culture ==
=== Art ===
In 2010, the Howard Yezerski Gallery in Boston (now the Miller Yezerski Gallery) hosted an exhibit titled "Boston Combat Zone: 1969-1978", featuring black-and-white photographs by Roswell Angier, Jerry Berndt, and John Goodman. At the opening, several former Combat Zone entertainers were critical of what they saw as an overemphasis on the area's negative aspects.

=== Comic Books ===
George Pérez's 1987 run on DC Comics' Wonder Woman (which established Boston as the heroine's primary base of operations) would occasionally feature the Combat Zone as a setting. Its most prominent appearance centered on a sex worker who deliberately parodied the heroine as part of her act, and was murdered by a religious fanatic.

=== Games ===
The 2015 video game Fallout 4 — set in a post-apocalyptic depiction of Massachusetts — features the Combat Zone as an explorable area. It takes on a literal meaning as an adult theater which has been repurposed into a fight club by local raiders. It is where the protagonist can recruit star fighter Cait as a companion.

=== Literature ===
In his first novel, A Case of Need (1968), a medical thriller/mystery novel set in the late 1960s Boston, the physician-turned-author Michael Crichton vividly describes the Combat Zone itself, the types and preponderance of injuries and diseases treated by the local public hospital, Boston City (which, he wrote, was sometimes referred to as "Boston Shitty"), and the opportunities working and training there presented to medical professionals, despite Boston City's low status relative to the city's other hospitals, to see and treat cases they might not be exposed to elsewhere. The novel was adapted into the film The Carey Treatment (1972).

Part 3 of Lynda Hull's seven-part poem, "Suite for Emily" (1993), describes the Combat Zone. Hull, an award-winning poet, lived for a time in Boston's Chinatown.

Stephen King mentions the Combat Zone in his novels The Stand (1978), Cujo (1981), Blaze (2007), and 11/22/63 (2011).

Robert B. Parker's Spenser novels often have his protagonist spending time in the Combat Zone.

In David Foster Wallace's encyclopedic novel Infinite Jest (1996), the characters Pemulis and Struck are alleged patrons of the Combat Zone after the district's relocation to "east of the Common".

=== Movies ===
In Martin Scorsese's 2006 film The Departed, Frank Costello (Jack Nicholson) and Colin Sullivan (Matt Damon) are surveilled by Billy Costigan (Leonardo DiCaprio) in a Combat Zone adult-film theater owned by Costello.

=== Music ===
"Lightning Strikes" by Aerosmith (1982) mentions the Combat Zone, as does the 1980 song "You May Be Right" by Billy Joel.

The Boston heavy metal band B.F. Raid (Boston's Final Raid) released an album titled Combat Zone, drawing direct thematic inspiration from the city’s former adult-entertainment district. The record includes the track “Greatest Show in Town,” a song that references the history of prostitution and the reputation the Combat Zone developed during its peak in the 1960s–1980s. Another track, “Divebar Allstars,” reflects the dive bars and nightlife culture that once characterized parts of downtown Boston surrounding the district.

=== Television ===
An episode of Boston-based television series, Cheers ("Showdown, Part 1" (1983)), includes a moment when Ernie Pantusso invites Sam Malone to the Combat Zone, to see "a girlie show". In a subsequent episode ("How Do I Love Thee?... Let Me Call You Back" (8 Dec. 1983)), the gang returns to the bar after a night at the Combat Zone led by Carla.

The Combat Zone is mentioned in several episodes of the detective drama Spenser: For Hire (1985–1988), also set in Boston and based on Robert B. Parker's Spenser novels.

== Image gallery ==
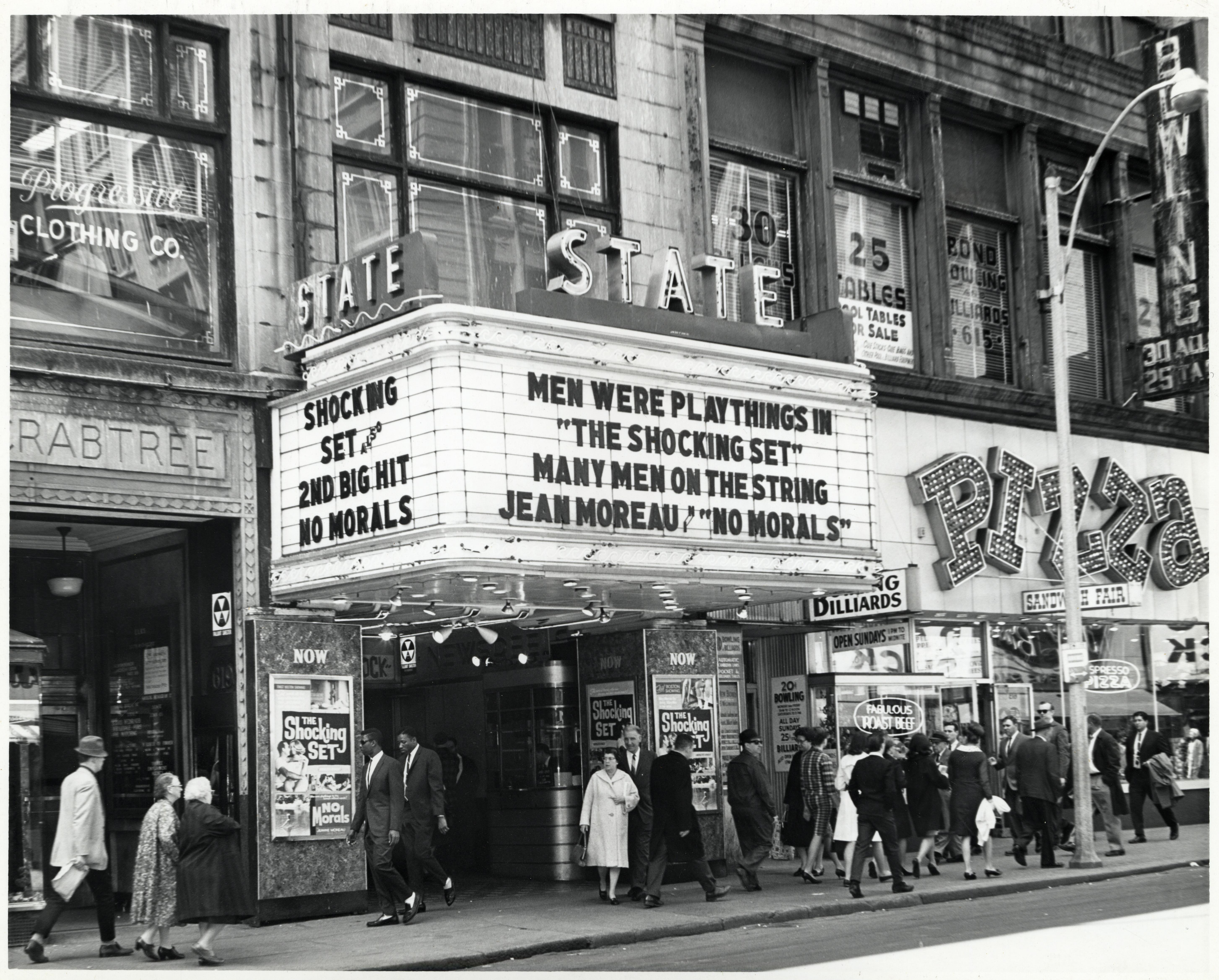
The State Theatre, 1960s.
City Censor, City of Boston

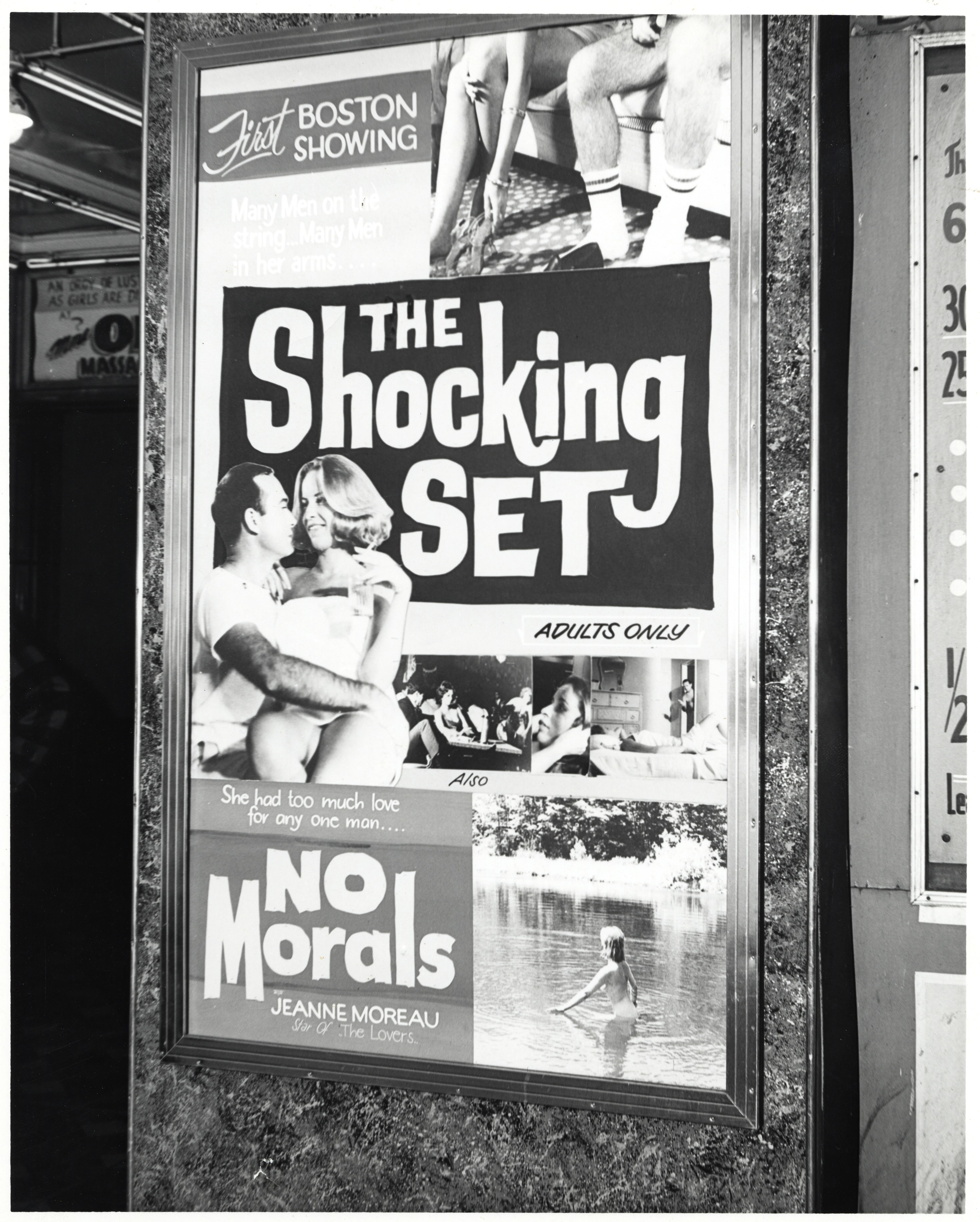
Film poster at the State Theatre, 1960s
City Censor, City of Boston

== See also ==
- Ann Street, Boston's red light district in the 19th century
- Banned in Boston
- Miller v. California
