= Playland Café =

Historical gay bar in Boston

Coordinates: 42°21′8.5″N 71°3′42.7″W

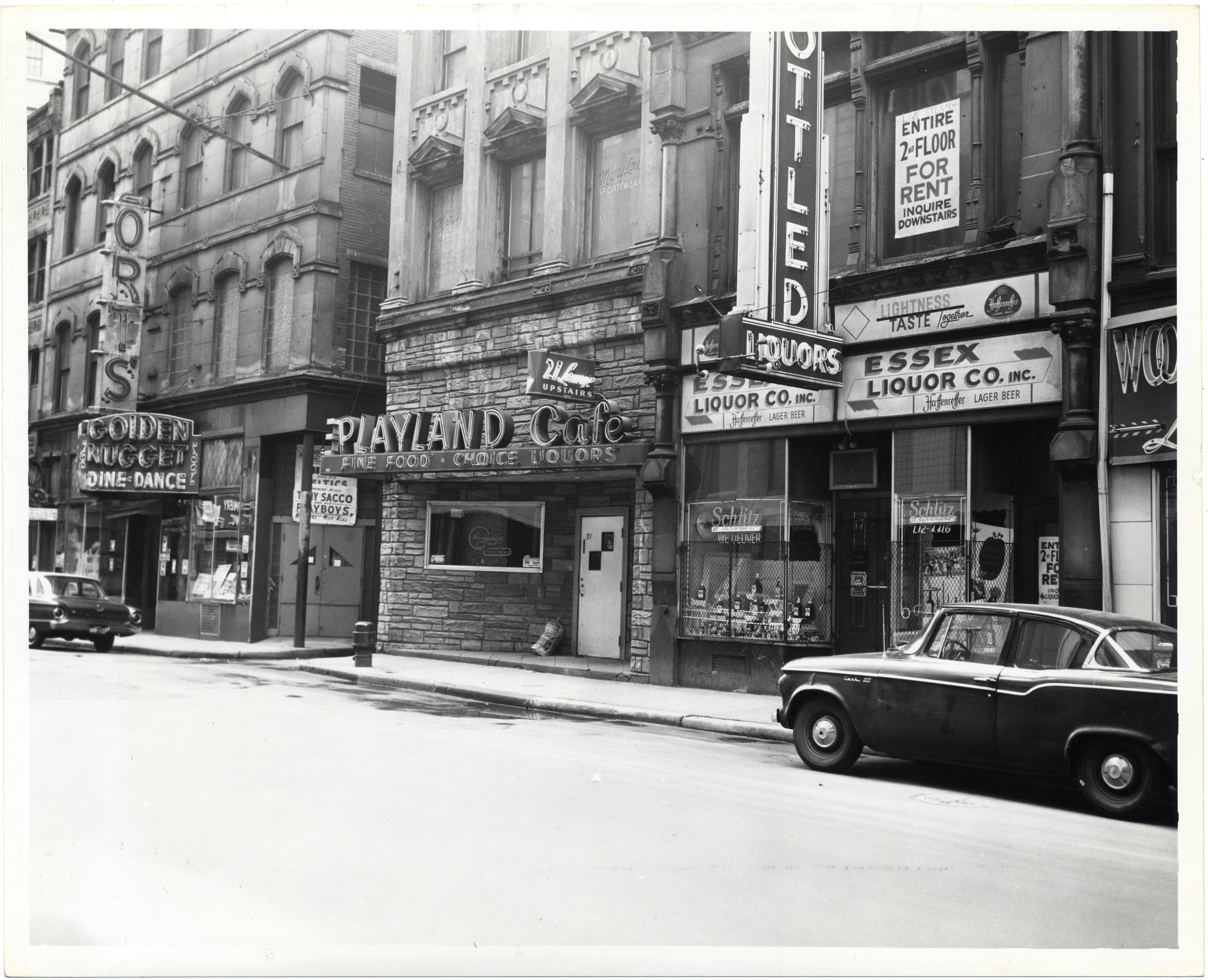
Essex Street in the 1960s. City of Boston Archives

The Playland Café (1937–1998), located at 21 Essex Street in Boston, Massachusetts, was Boston's oldest gay bar. (Note: According to Improper Bostonians, the bar opened in 1938. According to the owner, as reported in a Boston Globe story (Kindleberger, 1998), it opened in 1937.)

== History ==
According to Paul Staffier, when his father Rocco Staffier opened Playland in 1937 it was not a gay bar, but by the start of World War II it had begun attracting a gay clientele. When the bar closed in 1998, Staffier, who had run Playland for 40 years, said that it was not the "den of iniquity" it was reputed to be, and that arrests had been rare. Over the years it was mentioned only a few times in the Boston Globe.

=== 1930s–1940s ===
In the early days of the bar's operation, a mural on the wall depicted Playland regulars hobnobbing with movie stars. Dancers, singers, and other performers provided entertainment. A well-known lesbian performer, Marie Cord, frequented the bar and sang there. Since Boston's blue laws prohibited drinking at the bar on Sundays, at the stroke of midnight on Saturday employees would block access to the barstools and set out folding chairs, thus complying with the letter of the law. One bartender, Jim McGrath, worked at Playland for 38 years.

=== 1950s ===
According to historian Neil Miller, the crowd at Playland in the 1950s was surprisingly diverse for its time, both racially and in terms of class. Miller wrote, "Blue-collar truck drivers mingled with Harvard students."

In 1954, disturbed by reports of underage drinking by teenagers, authorities conducted undercover inspections of several Boston bars over a period of two and a half weeks. During that time, one teenager was spotted in the Playland Café and 17 were spotted in the Golden Nugget, the strip club next door. The following year, citing concerns about teenage drinking, the U.S. military declared Playland and ten other Boston bars off-limits to servicemen. Oddly enough, the blacklist did not include the Golden Nugget. It did include the Punch Bowl, the Touraine, the Melody Bar, and the Mardi Gras, all gay or "mixed crowd" bars.

=== The "Combat Zone" years ===
The Playland Café was in a part of town that became known in the 1960s as the Combat Zone. The bar was popular with drag queens. Writing in 2007, Boston Globe reporter Robert Sullivan recalled it as "a Combat Zone bar known for its sketchy clientele, banged-up piano, and year-round Christmas lights."

Playland was linked to a notorious murder trial in 1995. Chanelle Pickett, 23, an African-American trans woman, met William Palmer, a white computer programmer, at Playland. She and another trans woman left the bar with Palmer, and the three of them spent some time snorting cocaine at Pickett's apartment. Pickett then accompanied Palmer to his home, where, according to the medical examiner, Palmer beat her about the head and strangled her for over eight minutes. At his trial, Palmer claimed he had no idea Pickett was a trans woman until they began having sex; when he rejected Pickett, according to him, she attacked him and he was forced to defend himself. Other Playland patrons said that Palmer was a regular there, and had a well-known attraction to pre-op transsexuals. The defense portrayed Palmer as a naive dupe and Pickett as a cunning and dangerous "gender shape-shifter". Palmer was convicted of assault and battery but acquitted of murder, and sentenced to two years in prison.

In 1998, Playland still reportedly drew "the city's most eclectic crowd by age, class, race, and dress size." By then it had been in continuous operation for 60 years, making it Boston's oldest surviving gay bar. The bar lost its entertainment license in April 1998 after undercover police officers reported that drug dealers were using it as a base. The building was sold to developer Kevin Fitzgerald that September, and has since been demolished.

Jacques Cabaret, which opened in 1938 and is still in operation, is now Boston's oldest surviving "LGBT establishment." It became a gay bar in the mid-1940s, a lesbian bar in the 1960s, and a venue for drag performers in the 1970s.

== In art and popular culture ==
"Playland", a 1988 poem by the award-winning poet Mark Doty, is a homage to the Playland Café. Playland was also the subject of filmmaker Georden West's 2023 film 'Playland'.

== See also ==
- History of violence against LGBT people in the United States
