= St. Louis Sheriff's Department =

St. Louis Sheriff's Department may refer to:

- The Sheriff's Department of the city of St. Louis, Missouri
- The Sheriff's Department of St. Louis County, Missouri

== See also ==
- St. Louis Metropolitan Police Department
- St. Louis County Police Department
