= Nathan Gordon =

Nathan Gordon may refer to:

- Nathan Green Gordon (1916–2008), American lawyer, politician, and naval aviator who served as lieutenant governor of Arkansas
- Nathan Gordon (footballer) (born 1990), Australian rules footballer
- Nathan H. Gordon (1872–1938), American motion picture executive
