= Gordon's Olympia Theatre (Boston) =

Coordinates: 42°21′6.78″N 71°3′45.73″W

Gordon's Olympia Theatre (est. 1910s) in Boston, Massachusetts, was established by Nathan H. Gordon of Olympia Theatres, Inc. Architect Clarence Blackall designed the building at no.658 Washington Street, near Boylston Street in the theatre district. It later became the Pilgrim Theater. The building was demolished in 1996.

In late 1974, the Pilgrim Theater was the site of a drunken rant and press conference by House Ways and Means Committee chairman Wilbur Mills at the height of his sex scandal with Fanne Foxe, which prompted his resignation from the committee shortly afterwards.

== Images ==
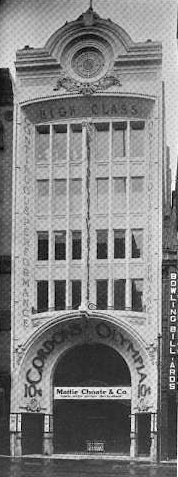
Gordon's Olympia, Washington St., Boston, 1910s

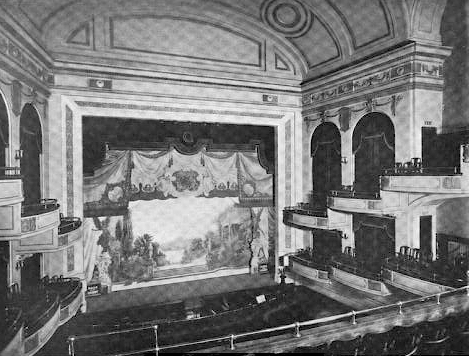
Interior, 1910s

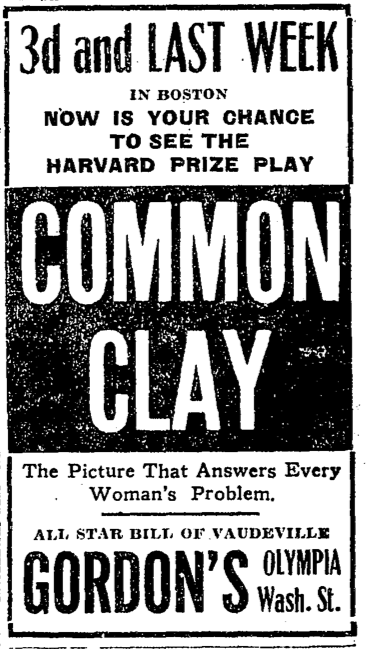
Advertisement, 1919

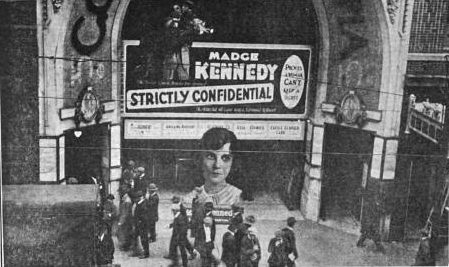
Street entrance, 1919

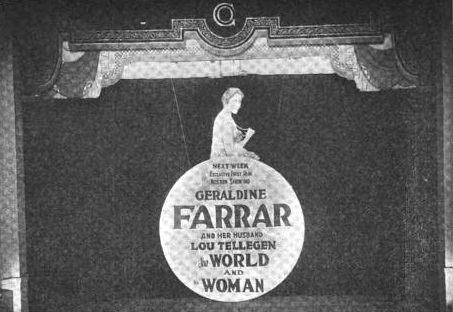
Interior, 1919

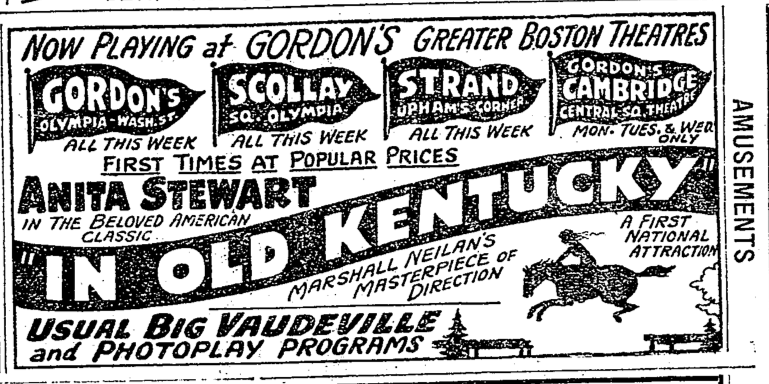
Advertisement, 1920

== See also ==
- Combat Zone, Boston
