= Wilbur D. Mills Dam =

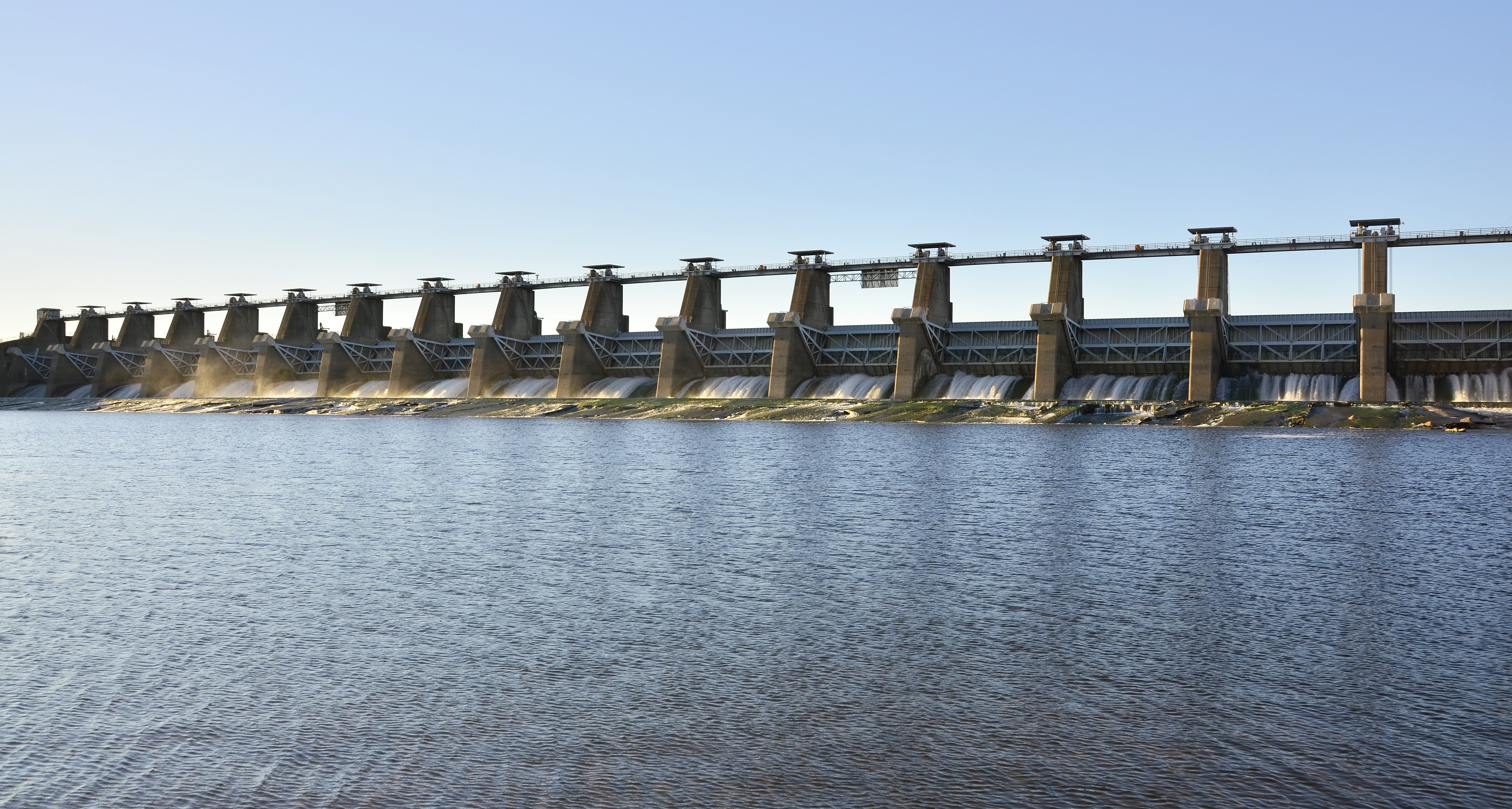
- Wilbur D. Mills Dam

- Location of Wilbur D. Mills Dam Wilbur D. Mills Dam (the United States)
- Country: United states
- Location: Arkansas County, Arkansas / Desha County, Arkansas
- Coordinates: 33°59′20″N 91°18′47″W
- Purpose: Flood control, power
- Status: Operational
- Construction began: 1963
- Opening date: 1968

Dam and spillways
- Type of dam: Barrage
- Impounds: Arkansas River
- Height (foundation): 52.4 ft (16.0 m)

Electric Cooperatives of Arkansas Hydropower Generating Station
- Commission date: 1999
- Installed capacity: 102.6 megawatts

Wilbur D. Mills Dam is a steel dam and generating facility located on the Arkansas River in Arkansas County and Desha County, Arkansas, United States.

The dam is part of the McClellan–Kerr Arkansas River Navigation System, and is named for Wilbur D. Mills, a member of United States House of Representatives from Arkansas.

== Design ==
Wilbur D. Mills Dam is 52.4 ft (16.0 m) high, and consists of a 3,773 ft (1,150 m) long earthen embankment, a 5,180 ft (1,580 m) long high-level overflow, and a 5,180 ft (1,580 m) long spillway.

== History ==
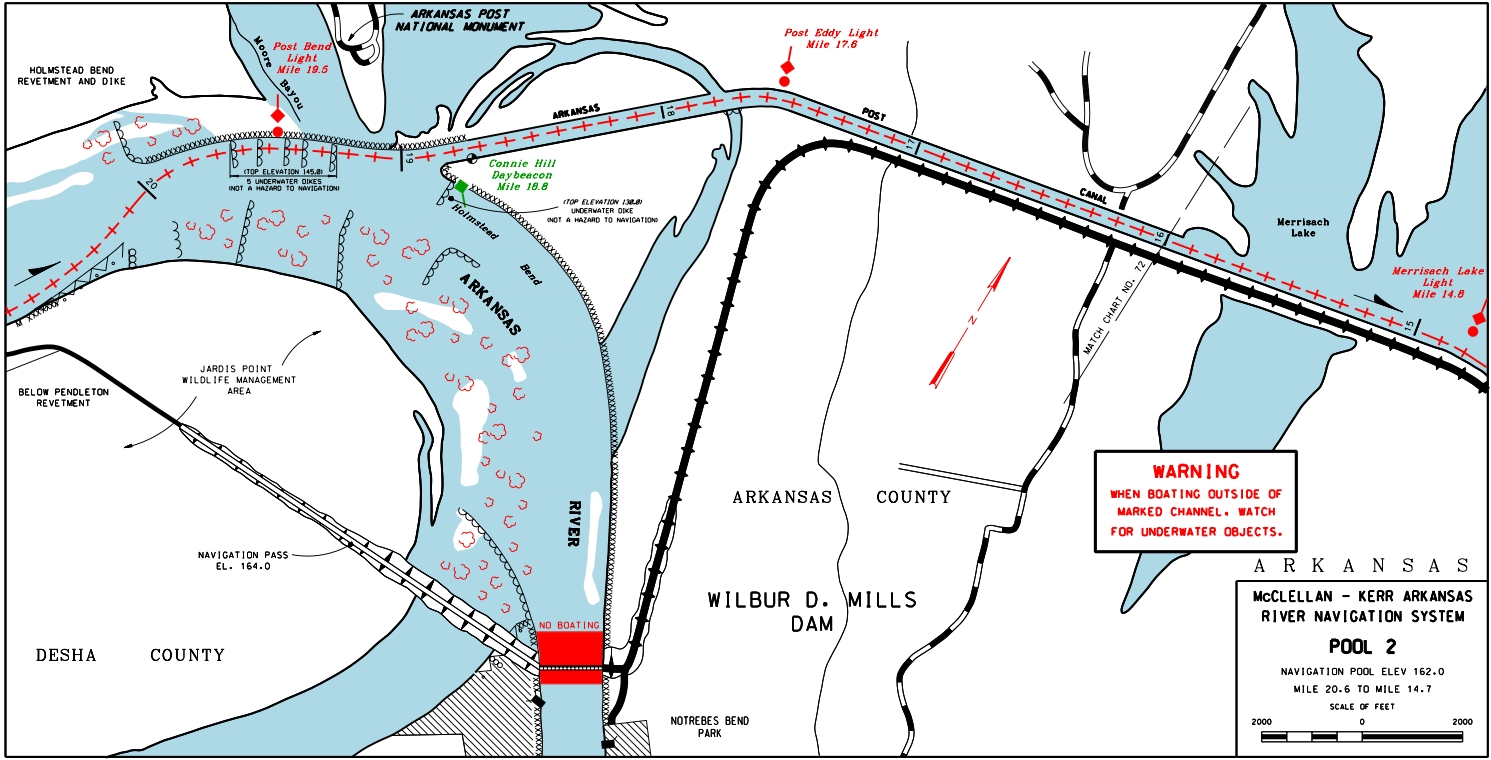
Navigation chart

The course of the lower Arkansas River changes significantly downstream from the location of the dam, where the river follows a long winding route until it reaches its outflow at the Mississippi River, approximately 25 mi (40 km) southeast. This circuitous portion of the Arkansas River between the current dam location and the Mississippi River was historically bypassed by river vessels; early steamboats instead followed a network of rivers—known as the Arkansas Post Canal—which flowed north of the lower Arkansas River, and followed a shorter and more direct route to the Mississippi River. When the McClellan–Kerr Arkansas River Navigation System was constructed between 1963 and 1970, the Arkansas Post Canal was significantly improved, while the lower Arkansas River continued to be bypassed by river vessels. For this reason, the dam was erected with no lock facilities because the waters downstream of the dam were used only by small recreational boats. Access to the Arkansas Post Canal is 2.5 mi (4.0 km) northwest of the Wilbur D. Mills Dam.

The dam was at first called Dam Number 2, and was constructed between 1963 and 1968.

In 1982, flooding along the Arkansas River caused 38 barges to break loose between 5 mi (8.0 km) and 8 mi (13 km) upstream from the dam. Fourteen of the barges struck the dam while two passed through the dam's open gate bays. Initial repairs cost $141,000, and additional repairs were initiated in 1990.

A hydroelectric power plant was installed at the dam between 1994 and 1999. Completed at a cost of $189 million, the plant has a generating capacity of 102.6 megawatts.

== Recreation area ==
The Wilbur D. Mills Campground is located on the Arkansas County side of the dam. The campground has 21 campsites and a boat launch.

== See also ==
- List of dams and reservoirs in Arkansas
