= Paramount Hotel explosion =

1966 fire in Boston, Massachusetts

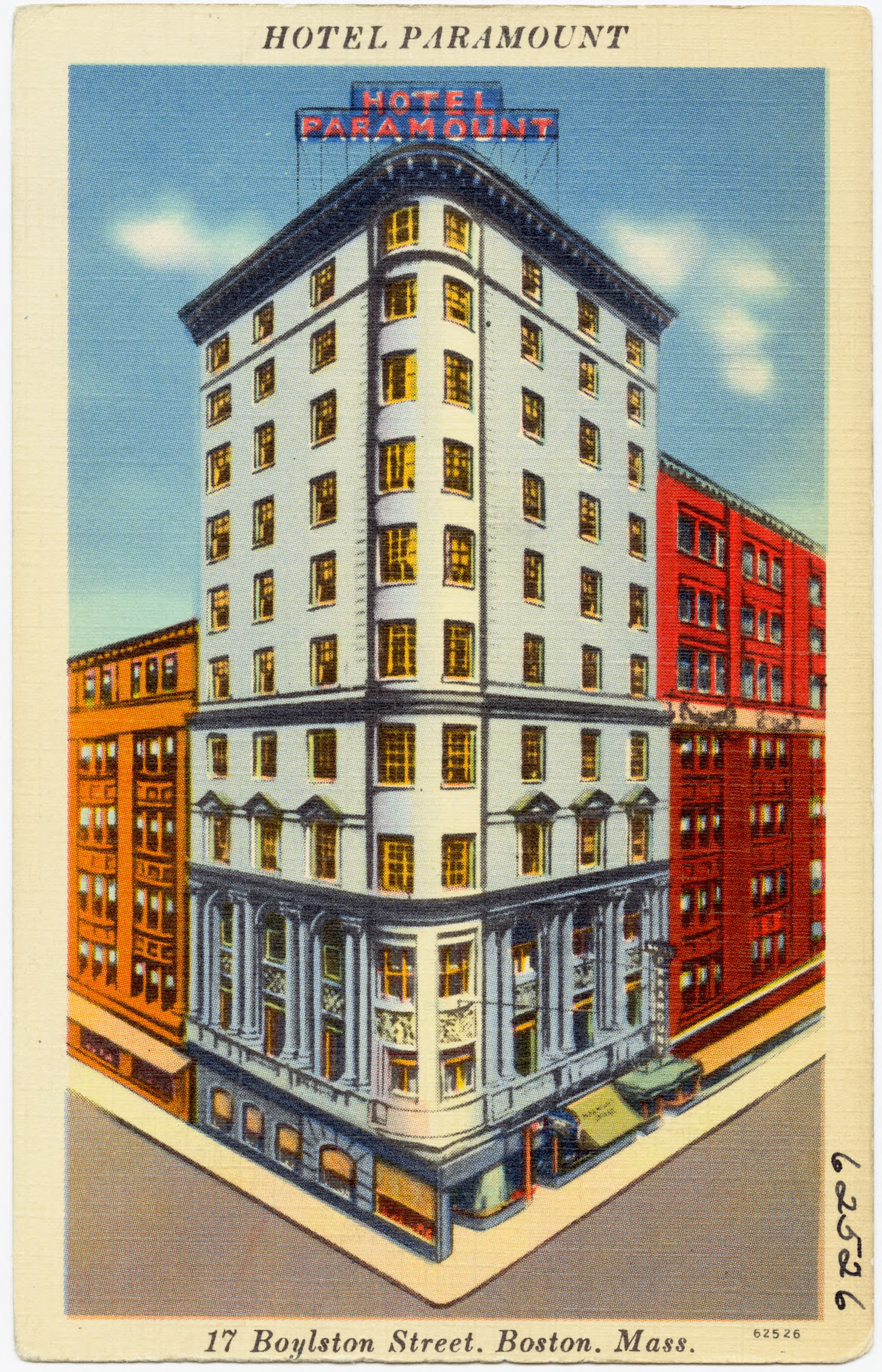
- Postcard of the Paramount Hotel
- Date: January 28, 1966; 60 years ago
- Time: 6:45 pm
- Location: 17 Boylston Street Boston, Massachusetts, U.S.; 42°21′08″N 71°03′45″W
- Cause: Gas leak
- Deaths: 11
- Injuries: 66

The Paramount Hotel explosion occurred on January 28, 1966, in Boston, Massachusetts, United States. A series of explosions under the hotel and resulting fires killed 11 people.

== Explosion ==
Around 6:45 pm, an intense explosion occurred on Boylston Street between Washington and Tremont Streets—an area known as the Combat Zone. The blast tore up a 50-foot (15 m) section of sidewalk and part of the street. The floor under the Paramount Hotel's cocktail lounge collapsed and around 30 of its patrons fell into the basement. The floor also gave out at Chatrelli's Coffee Shoppe and sent the chef, two cooks, and several patrons into the cellar. Within minutes of the explosion, fire spread through all eleven of the Paramount's floors. Flames observed coming up through the sewer grates and manholes over an hour after the explosion. Two more explosions followed, which resulted in the interiors of the Paramount and its neighboring hotel, The Plymouth partially collapsing, the destruction of Chatrelli's and a nearby cafe, and heavy damage to many other buildings. Windows were shattered in at least a dozen buildings near the Paramount. Nine people were killed and 68 were injured in the blast. Six of the deceased were pulled from the basement of the Paramount and the other three died in the hotel's upper floors. The injured were transported to Boston City Hospital, Massachusetts General Hospital, and Beth Israel Hospital. A fourth, less serious explosion occurred at 9 pm. Two of the hospitalized later died from their injuries.

== Inquest ==
Boston Municipal Court Judge Elijah Adlow held an inquest into the explosion. His report blamed the blast on a leak from a gas main and found no one criminally responsible for the disaster. The president of the Boston Gas Company disputed Adlow's findings, claiming that the main was destroyed as a result of the explosion.

== See also ==
- List of disasters in Massachusetts by death toll
