= Fanne Foxe =

American erotic dancer

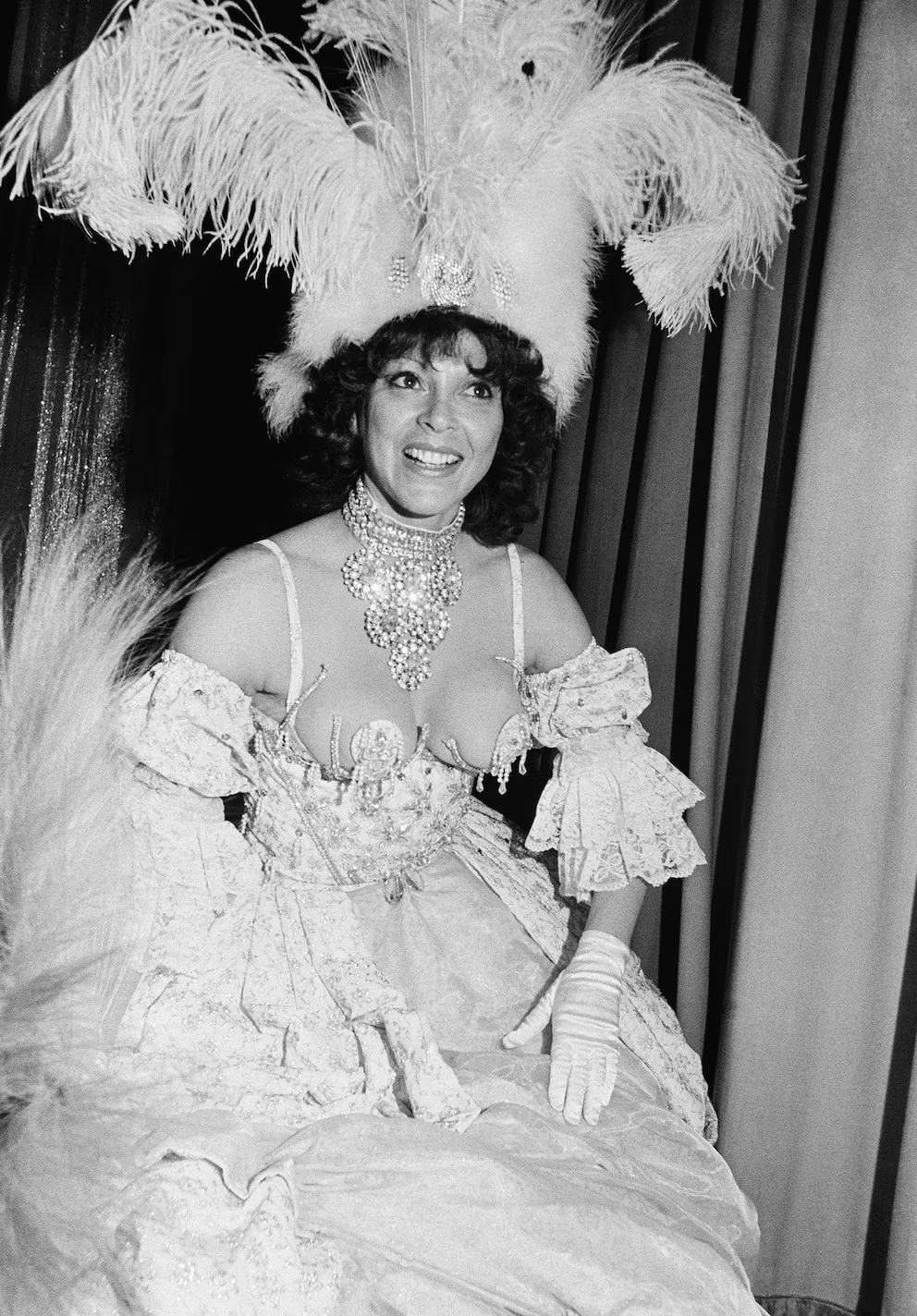
- Foxe in 1974
- Born: Annabel Edith Villagra; February 14, 1936; Nueve de Julio, Argentina
- Died: February 10, 2021 (aged 84); Clearwater, Florida, U.S.
- Other names: Annabel Battistella; Annabel Montgomery; The Argentine Firecracker; The Tidal Basin Bombshell
- Occupations: Stripper, actress, diving instructor
- Spouses: Eduardo Battistella; David Montgomery

Annabel Battistella (February 14, 1936 – February 10, 2021), known professionally as Fanne Foxe, was an Argentine-American stripper best known for being involved in a 1974 sex scandal surrounding Arkansas Congressman Wilbur Mills. At the time, Mills was the chair of the United States House Committee on Ways and Means and a powerful Democratic politician. The scandal was one of the most reported political sex scandals of the 1970s. In 2009, Foxe was on the Time list of top 10 mistresses, and her affair with Mills was on the Bloomberg list of top 10 U.S. sex scandals.

== Early life ==
Annabel Edith Villagra was born on February 14, 1936, in Nueve de Julio, a town southwest of Buenos Aires, Argentina. One of three children, her father was Nueve de Julio's medical officer, and her mother was a nurse. She grew up enjoying basketball, hunting, and folk dancing. She was a premedical student at the University of Buenos Aires, then left at age 20 in 1956 after marrying Eduardo Battistella, a pianist who played in clubs. She then began dancing to accompany his piano-playing act. By the early 1960s, their act took them to Miami, where she began stripping, and Baltimore. At this time, she began using the stage name Fanne Foxe at the behest of her agent.

Foxe emigrated to the United States in 1963 and became a legal resident in 1965. By the late 1960s, she was working in Washington, DC. Although their marriage had collapsed, she allowed her husband to live with her in the Crystal Towers complex in Arlington County, Virginia, because, as she told The Washington Post, "I don't like him to spend money, and he is the father of my children."

== Mills scandal ==
In summer 1973, Foxe was introduced to Wilbur Mills at the Silver Slipper club through a common friend and fellow performer. As chairman of the House Ways and Means Committee, Mills was considered one of the most powerful members of the United States House of Representatives and had been a minor contender for the Democratic nomination for president in 1972. By July 1973, Foxe and Mills were regular companions at the Silver Slipper. At the time, Foxe was the featured performer and was billed as the "Argentine Firecracker". Shortly after growing close to Mills, she stopped performing at the Silver Slipper. In August, Mills moved with his wife into the Crystal Towers complex, where they frequently played contract bridge with Foxe and her husband.

According to Foxe's memoir, Mills had promised to marry her if he could get a divorce. He had also taken her on a three-week vacation to Antigua. Foxe also said that she had been pregnant with Mills's child, but got an abortion to protect his reputation. Shortly before the affair became public, Foxe divorced Eduardo.

On the night of October 6–7, 1974, Mills and Foxe were at the Silver Slipper and got into a loud argument. While being driven back by a friend, the car they were in was observed speeding, swerving, and driving without headlights by the Washington, DC, waterfront near the Jefferson Memorial at around 2:00 am. The United States Park Police pulled the vehicle over, and Foxe panicked, got out of the car screaming in a mix of English and Spanish, and attempted to flee the scene by jumping into the Tidal Basin, which had an average depth of 10 feet (3.0 m). The police pulled her out and handcuffed her. She had two black eyes, and police thought she was suicidal, so she was taken to St. Elizabeths Hospital for treatment. In later interviews, Foxe said she jumped because she wanted to protect Mills's reputation and was worried that the incident would affect her recently acquired American citizenship.

The incident attracted much publicity, but Mills was re-elected to his congressional seat in November 1974. Shortly after the election, Mills attended one of Foxe's burlesque performances at the Pilgrim Theater in Boston. Apparently drunk, Mills showed up and unsteadily walked onstage, prompting Foxe to say "Ladies and gentlemen, I have a visitor for you, and he wants to say hello. Mr. Mills, where are you?" Mills then gave a rambling speech onstage and then a backstage news conference in which he angrily announced that Foxe would no longer be performing. On December 10, 1974, Mills stepped down from his position as chairman of the Ways and Means Committee and did not run for re-election in 1976, ending a 38-year congressional career.

The Foxe-Mills scandal was listed as number three in the top 10 U.S. sex scandals by Bloomberg in 2009, and Foxe was listed third on a list of Time magazine's top 10 mistresses.

== After the scandal ==
After the Mills incidents, Foxe continued working as a stripper, changing her stage title from "the Argentine Firecracker" to "the Tidal Basin Bombshell". A month after the October 1974 scandal, Bill O'Reilly interviewed her. He recounts that she told him of an interest to attend medical school after two more years of dancing. In summarizing her appearance at the Pilgrim Theater in Boston, he wrote that the crowd loved her performance.

Capitalizing on her notoriety, she was able to increase her appearance fees for performances at clubs. When hired by Michael Pinter Jr. for a December 1974 show at Club Juana in Orlando, Florida, she increased her fee for a two-week stint from $3,500 to $15,000 per week. On December 12, 1974, during the first week of her Orlando engagement, she was arrested for indecent exposure, allegedly after going completely nude during her act. Club owner Pinter was arrested for letting it happen. When arraigned on December 21, both Foxe and Pinter entered innocent pleas to the charges. The charges against both were dismissed on January 28, 1975, when the judge ruled that prosecutors failed to prove their case. After the Florida incident, Foxe announced her retirement from the stage. With the attention from the Mills scandal, she was able to land multiple media appearances and film offers.

In 1975, Battistella published the memoir The Stripper and the Congressman with the help of ghostwriter Yvonne Dunleavy. She also starred as herself in Posse from Heaven. With the proceeds from her fame, Battistella moved to an eight-bedroom house in Westport, Connecticut, with her three children from her marriage to Eduardo before 1976. In January and February 1976, she performed, but not as a stripper, at the Riverboat at the Empire State Building. In September 1976, she was featured in Playboy, and again in February 1977. In April 1977, she was interviewed in depth by Cheri magazine. Also in 1977, she starred in the documentary This Is America.

She also appeared in an off-Broadway production titled Women Behind Bars.

=== Later life and death ===
In 1980, Battistella married her manager, businessman Daniel Montgomery, and had a daughter before their 1985 divorce. In 1981, she gave an interview to The Washington Post in which she spoke about being upset that Mills claimed not to remember what he was doing during his affair, and was particularly hurt by his saying that he had "learned not to drink with foreigners".

Under the name Annabel Montgomery, she moved to St. Petersburg, Florida, in the late 1980s. She earned a bachelor's degree in communications from the University of Tampa in 1995 and master's degree in marine science and business administration—both magna cum laude—from the University of South Florida in 2001 and 2004, respectively. She worked as a divemaster for the University of South Florida and participated in underwater filming in Cozumel, Mexico.

Foxe died on February 10, 2021, in Clearwater, Florida, four days before her 85th birthday.

== Filmography ==
- Posse from Heaven (1975)
- This Is America (1977)
- Hay que parar la delantera (1977)
