= Joseph M. Jordan =

- Born: Joseph Michael Jordan; 1922; South Boston
- Died: May 10, 2014 (aged 91–92)
- Other name: Joe
- Police career
- Department: Boston Police Department
- Service years: 1946–1985
- Rank: Commissioner

Joseph Michael Jordan (1922 – May 10, 2014) was an American law enforcement officer who served as Commissioner of the Boston Police Department from 1976 to 1985. He was the first uniformed BPD officer to rise through the ranks to become commissioner.

== Early life ==
Jordan was born in South Boston. He was the second youngest of six children. As a child, Jordan wanted to be a police officer.

== Early career ==
In 1946, Jordan joined the Boston Police Department as a traffic patrol officer. In 1950 he became a detective. During the 1950s and 60s he was a member of "Slattery's Raiders", a group of officers under the command of Captain John J. Slattery, Jr. that was formed to combat vice and street crime in Boston. In 1967 Jordan was chosen to command the department's narcotics unit. Two years later he was promoted to Deputy Superintendent and Chief of Detectives. In 1973 he was placed in command of Area C, which consisted of the Allston, Brighton, Back Bay, and the South End. On July 17, 1974, Jordan was promoted to Superintendent and placed in charge of the Bureau of Field Services. He was later named Superintendent-in-Chief, the second highest position in the BPD after Commissioner.

While serving as a police officer, Jordan took courses at Northeastern University as a way to study to promotion exams. He spent sixteen years as a student at Northeastern and earned his bachelor's degree in 1969. He later completed a master's program in public administration.

== Commissioner ==
On October 5, 1976, Mayor Kevin White announced that Jordan would succeed Robert diGrazia as Commissioner when diGrazia's retirement became effective on November 15. The announcement was considered surprising because White chose to make Jordan's appointment permanent and not conduct a nationwide search. White said that he chose to make the permanent appointment because he wanted to prevent speculation that would put the progress the department made during diGrazia's tenure in jeopardy. Jordan's appointment made him the first career officer to become permanent commissioner.

During his tenure as Commissioner, Jordan was criticized by the BPD’s two labor unions, who believed that his changes in procedure were a collective bargaining matter. In 1984, Jordan and his top commanders were sued by the Superior Officers Federation over working conditions.

He was also criticized by Clergy and Citizens for Justice, a Roxbury-based group that believed Jordan and members of his department were insensitive to the people of color in the community and guilty of brutality. Jordan denied the allegations of police brutality and dismissed the group as "ultra-liberals" who "[had] to criticize because that's their lifestyle". He pointed to the fact that the number of minority uniformed officers increased from 5 to 15 percent during his tenure as proof that he was not insensitive to minorities.

In 1983, the Massachusetts Civil Service Commission charged Jordan and White with using Proposition 2 1/2 "as a cover" to lay off 284 patrolmen in 1981. Jordan disputed the accusation, stating that because his budget needed to be cut by $20 million and 90% of the department's budget was in personnel, the layoffs were necessary.

After he was elected mayor in 1983, Raymond Flynn expressed his desire to name his own Commissioner and asked Jordan to step down, a request which Jordan refused. However, on January 15, 1985, Jordan announced that he was retiring effective January 31. The announcement came after negotiations with the mayor's aides resulted in an agreement in which Jordan would return for one day to the rank of superintendent, which, as a uniformed officer, would entitle Jordan to a buy-back of accrued sick leave and unused vacation time.

After his retirement from the BPD, Jordan became an associate at Cass Associates, a Boston security consulting and investigating firm that developed security and drug programs for hospitals and technology companies.

Police appointments
| Preceded by Robert diGrazia | Commissioner of the Boston Police Department; 1976–1985 | Succeeded by Francis Roache |
