= Nathan H. Gordon =

American film producer

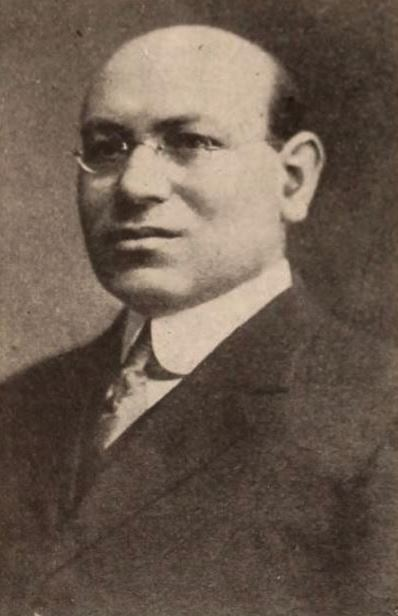
Nathan Gordon, from a 1920 magazine

Nathan Harry Gordon (1872 - 1938) was an American motion picture executive.

== Biography ==
Gordon was born in Vilna, Russian Empire (currently Vilnius, Lithuania), March 15, 1872, the son of a medical practitioner. He attended a college at Vilna, taking the rabbinical course, and came to the United States in 1890. After working for a time in a harness shop at Meriden, Connecticut, he went West and with headquarters at Denver, Colorado, established a photograph enlarging business, traveling from town to town by wagon and enlarging pictures as he went. Later he operated a picture slot-machine place at Helena, Montana, and a drug store at Seattle, Washington.

In 1902 he returned to Denver where he became part owner of a penny arcade, showing slot-machine pictures. In the following year he returned to New England and with his brother Israel Gordon opened a slot-machine picture business at Worcester, Mass., placing machines in stores, penny arcades and elsewhere. Later he established penny arcades in several neighboring cities in Massachusetts and Connecticut. In 1906 he opened at Worcester a “nickelodeon,” the first motion picture theatre in that city. Its success prompted him to extend the scope of his operations gradually until he became the largest operator of motion picture and vaudeville theatres in New England. He also built, with his three brothers, the Gordon Olympia theatre at Rochester, N.Y. In 1912 he organized and became president of Olympia Theatres, Inc., which eventually operated thirty-eight motion picture theatres in New England. He was also the managing director of each theatre in the chain. Secondarily, Gordon and Louis Mayer formed the Gordon-Mayer Theatrical Company, which booked talent for his theatres and distributed Metro's pictures. Meanwhile, as one of the largest exhibitors of motion pictures, Gordon became interested in the stabilization of conditions in the industry and in 1917 was largely instrumental in organizing the First National Exhibitors Circuit, Inc., of which he was elected a vice-president and director. This corporation, which was succeeded in 1919 by Associated First National Pictures, Inc., and in 1924 by First National Pictures, Inc., was formed originally to function as an agency to lease and distribute motion pictures for exhibition by its members. More specifically, by late 1921, over 4,000 franchise holders were participating in a consolidated enterprise with an estimated value of $50 million for "the elimination of wasteful expense and for the betterment of the quality of photoplays and methods of exchanging and distributing films." This limitation on its field of action, however, did not long continue, the corporation early developing into a product of motion pictures on a large scale, with an extensive plant at Burbank, Calif., and with some of the most popular film stars of that period, including Charlie Chaplin, Douglas Fairbanks and Mary Pickford, on its list of actors. As recalled by his son, William J. J. Gordon:

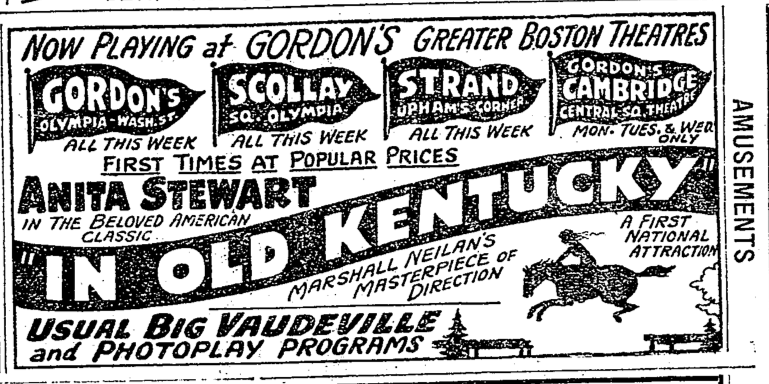
Advertisement for Gordon's theatres in the Boston area, 1920

"My father was a typical bourgeois. The theatre business wasn't formal enough for him. Some people he admired on the screen, but couldn't do business with. Charlie Chaplin, for instance; he couldn't stand him personally. Father was a banker; the sooner he could put on banking clothes, the more relaxed he was. Louis Mayer he regarded as perhaps overenthusiastic but an honorable man, far more than most of the people in the business."

Gordon, as a director and member of the executive committee, played an important role in this evolution. He resigned from the directorate in 1923 but as one of the largest stockholders continued active in the management of First National Pictures until control of the corporation was acquired by Warner Bros. Pictures, Inc., in 1928. Meanwhile he disposed of his interest in Olympia Theatres, Inc., to the Paramount Famous Lasky Corp. in 1925. According to the Boston Daily Globe, the transaction was reportedly valued at $12 million and included Gordon's holdings in 38 moving picture playhouses in New England.

Widely known for his philanthropic interests, he was a trustee of the Beth Israel hospital in Boston and a director of the Associated Jewish Philanthropies of that city and the Hebrew Ladies home at Dorchester, Mass. He was non-sectarian in his benefactions, however, giving generously to Christian as well as Jewish institutions and causes. Among these was the Baptist hospital in Boston, to which he donated the Gordon Piazza. A man of innumerable private charities, he helped many of his employees to build homes and at Christmas time made gifts to hundreds of children.

Possessing great energy, courage and driving power, he overcame the handicap of serious ill health in his youth and became a successful and respected figure in the motion picture industry. He was married at Rochester, N.Y., Aug. 25, 1909, to Sarah Anna, daughter of Abraham Edinberg, a merchant of Worcester, Mass., and they had three children—Alvin, William and Marion. As retold by his daughter:

"He was a powerhouse, an impossible father and not a very good husband, but he was terribly, terribly intelligent. He never owned a house until he was sixty. He rented those huge places already furnished, and Mother would have to accommodate herself. ... One of the biggest houses was in Jamaica Plain. It had a bowling alley in the garage. And you know that painting by John Singer Sargent of the three young girls, The Daughters of Edward Darley Boit? We lived in that house for a while."

Gordon died at Weston, Mass., June 3, 1938.

== See also ==
- Gordon's Olympia Theatre (Boston)
- Strand Theatre (Boston)
