= Robert diGrazia =

American police officer (1928–2018)

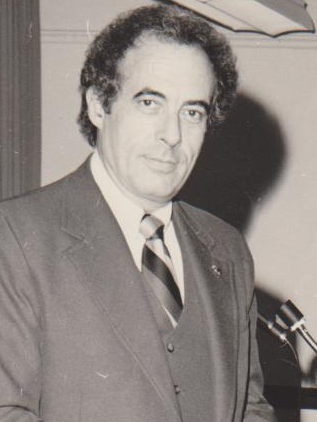
- diGrazia, circa 1976

Commissioner of the Boston Police Department
- In office November 1, 1972 – November 15, 1976
- Preceded by: Edmund McNamara
- Succeeded by: Joseph M. Jordan

Personal details
- Born: February 24, 1928 San Francisco, California
- Died: April 26, 2018 (aged 90) Fort Myers, Florida

Robert Joseph diGrazia (Note: His family name may also appear in sources as DiGrazia or di Grazia.) (February 24, 1928 – April 26, 2018) was an American police officer who served as Commissioner of the Boston Police Department from 1972 to 1976.

== Biography ==
diGrazia grew up in San Francisco, where he graduated from Galileo High School. His parents were immigrants from the Tuscany region of Italy. In his late teens, he served 21 months in the United States Coast Guard and then briefly attended City College of San Francisco followed by night classes at the University of San Francisco. He worked for Macy's, rising from a part-time supply clerk to a full-time department head. In the late 1950s, he worked as a manufacturers' representative, then became a deputy sheriff in Marin County, California.

diGrazia worked as a police officer in Novato, California, from 1961 to 1969, becoming the chief of police in 1963. He then led the St. Louis County Police Department in Missouri from 1970 to 1972. diGrazia was named commissioner of the Boston Police Department in October 1972 by Boston mayor Kevin White and took office the following month. He oversaw the Boston police during several years of the Boston desegregation busing crisis. In October 1976, diGrazia announced his resignation following a disagreement with White over his pay; he left his role in Boston the following month. diGrazia then led the Montgomery County Police Department in Maryland until he was fired in December 1978. He subsequently worked as a law enforcement consultant and expert witness.

diGrazia earned an Associate of Arts from Michigan State University (1966) and a Bachelor of Arts from Boston College (c. 1975). He died in 2018, aged 90. He had been married twice and was survived by his second wife, two sons, two daughters, and three step-daughters.

== Notes ==
Police appointments
Preceded by Edmund McNamara	Commissioner of the Boston Police Department; 1972–1976	Succeeded by Joseph M. Jordan
