= St. Louis County Police Department =

Law enforcement agency in St. Louis County, Missouri, US

Coordinates: 38°39′00″N 90°20′20″W

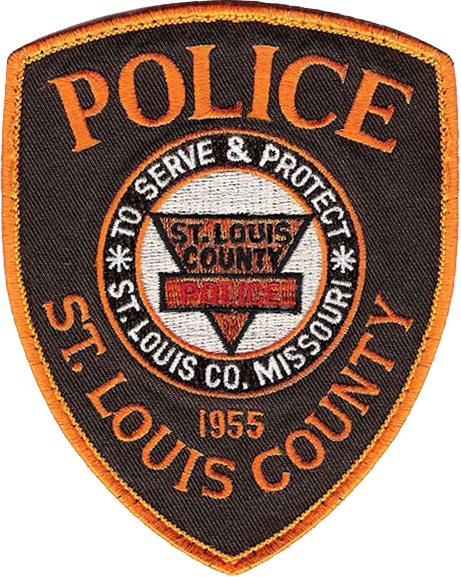
- Common name: St. Louis County PD
- Abbreviation: SLCPD
- Motto: To Serve and Protect

Agency overview
- Formed: July 1, 1955; (71 years ago)
- Preceding agency: St. Louis County Sheriff's Office
- Employees: 1,290 (2020)
- Annual budget: $87,561,609 (2010) $87,673,800 (2011) $147,707,521 (2020)

Jurisdictional structure
- Operations jurisdiction: St. Louis County, Missouri, United States
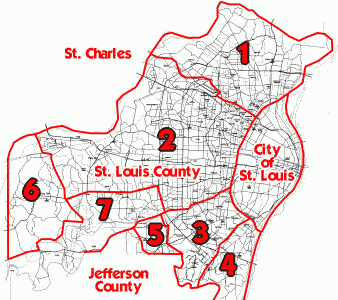
- jurisdiction of St. Louis County Police Department
- Area: 520 sq mi (1,300 km^{2}).
- Population: 1,005,159 (2022 Census)
- Legal jurisdiction: St. Louis County, Missouri
- Governing body: St. Louis County Board of Police Commissioners
- Constituting instrument: Yes
- General nature: Local civilian police

Operational structure
- Headquarters: 7900 Forsyth Boulevard St. Louis, Missouri 63105
- Sworn members: 800 (2020)
- Unsworn members: 329 (2018)
- Board of Police Commissioners responsible: Brain Ashworth, Chairman; Richard E. Banks, Vice-Chairman; Thomasina Hassler, Member; Michael Wild, Member
- Agency executives: Colonel Juan Cox, Chief of Police; Lieutenant Colonel James Schneider, Deputy Chief of Police; Lieutenant Colonel Norman Mann, Division of Operational Support; Lieutenant Colonel Gerald Lohr, Division of Criminal Investigations

Facilities
- Precincts: 8 Precincts, 12 sub-stations
- Helicopters/Airplanes: 6 Helicopters, 1 Fixed Wing

Website
- St. Louis County Police Department Official Website

The St. Louis County Police Department (SLCPD) is the primary and largest law enforcement agency serving St. Louis County in the U.S. state of Missouri. The current Chief of Police is Colonel Juan Cox. According to the Charter of St. Louis County, the county police chief has all of the criminal law enforcement duties of the sheriff of St. Louis County, except for the operation of the St. Louis County Jail, which is handled by the St. Louis County Department of Justice Services (civilian), court bailiff and service of civil process, which is handled by the St. Louis County Sheriffs Office (civilian). Court bailiff/civil process duties are provided by a court-appointed sheriff and his employees, none of whom have law enforcement powers.

The St. Louis County Police Department is the Largest County police agency in Missouri, based on number of employees, county population, and geographic area served.

This change in law enforcement services occurred in 1955, when the St. Louis County Charter was amended by the voters to restrict the duties of the St. Louis County Sheriff's Office. The position of elected sheriff was eliminated. St. Louis County is one of two counties in Missouri that does not have an elected sheriff. With the charter amendment, all law enforcement services were assigned to a new police agency, the St. Louis County Police Department. The department is primarily responsible for law enforcement and investigations within unincorporated St. Louis County and contract municipalities, however, it has full police authority throughout the county, including its 88 municipalities which are also served by 58 local police departments, some of them very small. Additionally, St. Louis County police officers are authorized to enforce Missouri law in all counties in the state having a government of the first classification, which includes the independent City of St. Louis. Deputy Chief Kenneth Gregory was appointed to the position of Chief of Police on January 28, 2022, by the St. Louis County Board of Police Commissioners.

== Departmental history ==
The St. Louis County Police Department was established on July 1, 1955. The department was created with 95 officers and 18 civilian employees. The department is divided into four divisions: Patrol, Operational Support, Special Operations, and Criminal Investigation. It is the third largest local police agency in the state and one of two county police departments in Missouri, the other being the St. Charles County Police Department. The SLCPD is accredited by the Commission on Accreditation for Law Enforcement Agencies. CALEA is the only international body that accredits law enforcement agencies. Only seven percent of all U.S. law enforcement agencies are accredited. In 2010, CALEA recognized the St. Louis County Police Department with it distinguished Tri-Arc Award. The Tri-Arc Award is reserved for those police agencies that have successfully accredited their law enforcement services, police academy and communications division. Only six agencies in the world have achieved this status.

Starting in October 2018, the St. Louis County Police Department began patrolling Kinloch after it dissolved its city police department.

On October 25, 2019, a jury awarded $20 million to a police sergeant for discrimination by the St. Louis County Police Department. Witnesses testified that police department leadership had said that the sergeant would never be promoted because he was "way too out there with his gayness and he needed to tone it down if he wanted a white shirt." (The command staff are called "white shirts" because of the color of their uniform shirts.) On October 27 County Executive Sam Page announced that "the time for leadership changes has come and change must start at the top" of the St. Louis County Police Department. After reaching the settlement, Chief Jon Belmar resigned from his position. It is unclear if insurance would cover the amount.

=== Fallen officers ===
From October 4, 1871, to December 1, 2021, the Officer Down Memorial Page reported that 13 officers in the St. Louis County Police Department died in the line of duty.

== Board of Police Commissioners ==
The St. Louis County Board of Police Commissioners is responsible for the operation of the department . The Board sets policy, makes promotions, holds both closed and open meetings and coordinates with the Chief of Police in providing police services to the citizens. Four of the five members of the board are selected by the County Executive of St. Louis County, following approval of the County Council, with the County Executive serving as the sixth member. As provided in the St. Louis County Charter, the St. Louis County Police Department operates under the control of a civilian board of commissioners appointed by the County Executive with the approval of a majority of the County Council. Commissioners serve overlapping three year terms.

As of 2025, the membership is: Board of Commissioners

Member	Title
Richard E. Banks	Chairman
Michael A. Wild	Vice Chairman
Thomasina Hassler	Secretary
Anthony Thompson	Board Member
Brian Ashworth	Board Member

== Office of the Chief of Police ==
The Chief of Police serves as the senior sworn member of the SLCPD. Juan Cox is the eleventh individual to hold the post and Second African-American Chief in SLCPD History. Prior to 1955 the position was known as the Superintendent of Police and was later changed to Chief of Police.

The Office of the Chief of Police is responsible for the planning, efficient administration and operation of the Police Department under the authority of the Board of Police Commissioners.

The Chief of Police reports directly to the Board of Police Commissioners.

The Office of the Chief of Police has seven units or bureaus:

1. Chief of Police: Colonel Juan Cox (appointed to the position of Chief of Police on June 9, 2026)
2. Deputy Chief of Police: Lieutenant Colonel James Schneider
3. Bureau of Professional Standards
4. Police Contract Services
5. Media Relations and Public Information
6. Bureau of Research and Analysis
7. Intelligence Operations Bureau
8. Bureau of Human Resources

=== Chiefs of Police ===
Chief of Police	Term
Albert E. DuBois	1955–1956
Raymond W. Hensley	1956–1969
Robert diGrazia	1969–1972
G. H. Kleinknecht	1973–1990
Ronald A. Battelle	1990–2004
Jerry Lee	2004–2009
Timothy E. Fitch	2009–2013
Jon M. Belmar	2014–2020
Mary T. Barton	2020–2021
Kenneth Gregory	2021–2026
Juan Cox	2026–Present

== Division of Patrol ==
The Division of Patrol is commanded by Lieutenant Colonel TBA.

The SLCPD is divided into eight police precincts, three of which are contracted cities, Fenton, Wildwood, Jennings (5th, 6th and 8th). Each precinct's cars are issued plates with a letter corresponding to the assigned precinct. The agency contracts with another 16 municipal governments to provide full-time police protection. Although the agency has full police authority of the sheriff in the entire county, including all municipalities, direct service population for the SLCPD is over 400,000 residents. A majority of these 400,000 residents are located in South St. Louis County and Affton, both of which are unincorporated but heavily populated and suburban. The division fields 33 School Resource Officers (SRO) to various school districts in the county.

Police Precincts	Precinct Captain
North County Precinct (1st)	James Morgan
Central County Precinct (2nd)	Jeremy Romo
Affton-Southwest Precinct (3rd)	Guy Means
South County Precinct (4th)	Brian Schellman
City of Fenton Precinct (5th)	Kevin Lawson
City of Wildwood Precinct (6th)	James Mundel
West County Precinct (7th)	Tim Ware
City of Jennings Precinct (8th)	Aaron Roediger

County Police Precincts

- 1st- North County (Plates: A)
- 2nd- Central County (Plates: B)
- 3rd- Affton Southwest County (Plates: C)
- 4th- South County (Plates: D)
- 5th- City of Fenton (Plates: F)
- 6th- City of Wildwood (Plates: G)
- 7th- West County (Plates: H)
- 8th - City of Jennings (Plates: J)

Vehicles marked with plates "T" are Tactical Unit vehicles or are used for the Tactical Unit; vehicles with plates "E" are for administration, D.A.R.E., K-9 Units, MetroLink, or other special non-patrol units.

Patrol Officers are issued the SIG Sauer P229R .40 semi-automatic pistol which replaced the Smith & Wesson 4006 .40 semi-automatic pistol in 2007. Detectives were issued the S&W 4013 .40 and the S&W 4014 .40, but now carry the SIG Sauer P229R .40 like the patrol officers.

== Division of Special Operations ==
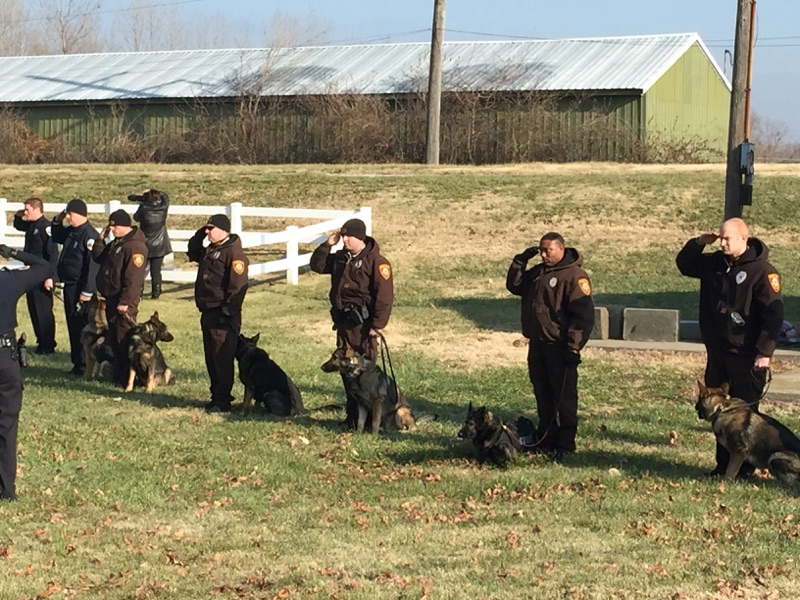

The Division of Special Operations is commanded by Lieutenant Colonel Jason Law.

The Division of Special Operations staffs a full-time Tactical (TACT) Unit consisting of 21 members, as well as nine K-9 Units trained to detect narcotics, locate missing persons and apprehend suspects. As a matter of policy, the department uses SWAT and police dogs to serve all felony warrants. Special Operations is also responsible for entrance security at the County Jail, Family Court and St. Louis County Courthouse in Clayton, Bureau of Tactical Operations, Special Response Unit, Metro Air Unit, Highway Safety Unit, MetroLink Police Unit, Crisis Intervention Team, and Office of the Chaplains.

In 2004, the St. Louis County Police Department, the Metropolitan Police Department, City of St. Louis, and the St. Charles County Sheriff's Department joined to share resources and created the Metro Air Support. Metro Air Support, as of January 1, 2020, boasts 5 helicopters, 1 fixed wing airplane, 10 pilots, 1 flight instructor, and 2 mechanics.

== Division of Criminal Investigations ==
The Division of Criminal Investigation is commanded by Lieutenant Colonel Gerald Lohr.

The SLCPD has the largest investigative unit in the state. Nearly 200 detectives provide county-wide services for the crimes of homicide, child abuse, St. Louis Regional Bomb and Arson Unit, domestic violence, sexual assault, fugitive apprehension, auto theft, burglary, fraud, robbery, drug abuse, and child exploitation. The SLCPD also has a full-time ASCLAD-Lab accredited Crime Laboratory, Fingerprint Unit, Prisoner Conveyance Unit, Crime Scene Unit (CSI), Bureau of Drug Enforcement, and Polygraph Unit.

== Division of Operational Support ==
The Division is commanded by Lieutenant Colonel Norman Mann.

The SLCPD provides a wide range of support services for the department and community which include the following:

- Bureau of Communications
- Emergency Communications Network
- Office of Emergency Management
- Bureau of Central Police Records
- St Louis County and Municipal Police Academy
- Police IT Unit

== Commissioned/sworn positions ==
The SLCPD uses the following ranks.

Officers with the power of arrest.

Title	Insignia	Additional information
Chief of Police		Chief of St. Louis County Police Department
Deputy Chief		Deputy Chief of St. Louis County Police Department
Lieutenant Colonel		Lieutenant Colonels command a division within the St. Louis County Police Department.
Captain		Captains Command Precincts & Bureaus.
Lieutenant		Lieutenants Serve as 2nd in command of Precincts & Bureaus.
Sergeant		Sergeants are Field Supervisors.
Detective		Detective.
Police Officer		Front line Law Enforcement Officers
Probationary Police Officer		Fresh out of the academy.

== Professional staff (non-sworn) positions ==
- Professional any non-supervisory employee that is not commissioned.
- Supervisor Professional staff employee equal to rank or pay grade of commissioned Sergeant or Lieutenant
- Director Professional staff employee equal to rank or pay grade of commissioned Captain
- Executive Director Professional staff employee equal to rank or pay grade of commissioned Lieutenant Colonel

== See also ==
- List of law enforcement agencies in Missouri
