= Izzy Ort's Bar & Grille =

Music venue in Boston, Massachusetts

Coordinates: 42.352°N 71.062°W

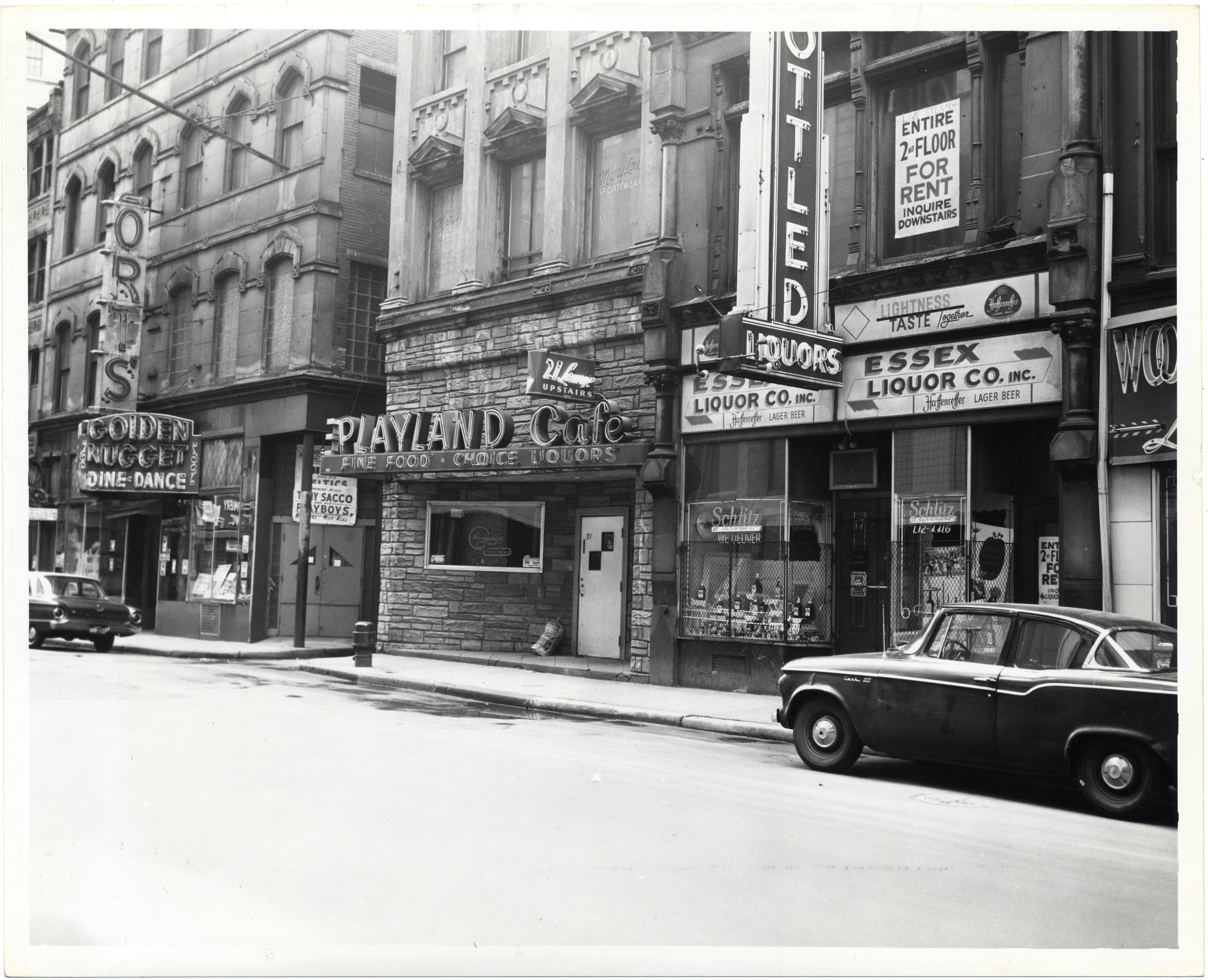
Essex Street in the 1960s. City of Boston Archives

Izzy Ort's Bar & Grille was a live music venue located at 25 Essex Street in Boston, Massachusetts.

== History ==
Izzy Ort's was open from 1935 to 1969. Originally it featured jazz musicians. In 1953, the owner renamed it the Golden Nugget and switched to hillbilly music, and later, rock. Musicians played on two floors: in the main room at street level, and in a room upstairs called El Tropico. Izzy Ort's was one of the first strip bars in what would later become known as Boston's Combat Zone. As a popular hangout for sailors, it was notorious among musicians for being a rough place to play. Like the Silver Dollar, it was patronized by both heterosexual and gay men.

The bar was owned by Isadore "Izzy" Ort (1893 - 1975), a reputed former bootlegger from New York City who moved to Boston in the early thirties. Ort, who left school after the fourth grade, was known in Boston as a colorful character who settled disputes among his patrons with a metal flashlight. He also had a reputation for generosity to servicemen. Anyone in the service who was away from home on Thanksgiving or Christmas would be served a free turkey dinner at Izzy Ort's. In the early 1940s, Ort bought space in the Boston Record-American for a regular column of his own, titled "I Wuz Thinkin." The column was accompanied by a picture of Ort wearing his characteristic fedora and smoking a cigar.

25 Essex Street later became part of Hong Lok House, an affordable housing project for Chinatown's elderly residents in January 1982.

== Notable performers ==
Many notable jazz musicians played at Izzy Ort's in the 1940s and early 1950s. Quincy Jones played there in the early 1950s to help pay for school at Schillinger House of Music (now known as Berklee College of Music). Although he recalled it as "a real dive," he noted that two musicians he worked with there, pianist Preston Sandiford and alto player Bunny Campbell, were influential in his musical development. His friend Buddy Catlett said in a 1993 interview that Jones didn't become a good soloist until he began working at Izzy Ort's.

The great baritone saxophonist, Serge Chaloff, performed there when he was just fourteen. His brother Richard Chaloff remembered: 'He didn't have a permit to work but he was pretty tall and he went down to see Izzy Ort...and played for him and Izzy liked the sax...and he hired my brother to work nights....My mother used to pray on Sundays that that he'd make it outa there....My brother sat in with bandsmen that were in their thirties and forties...and here he was fourteen, fifteen years old and he played right along with them, and he did so well that they kept him.'

Alto saxophonist Charlie Mariano also played at Izzy Ort's in his youth. According to Mariano, the bar had an upstairs band, which was white, and a downstairs band, which was black. Mariano started working upstairs, but when the alto player downstairs joined the Coast Guard, the black band hired him. "That was a fantastic experience," he said, "because they were playing the music I loved - Duke Ellington, [Jimmie] Lunceford, Basie."

Jazz trumpeter Ruby Braff, who considered Izzy Ort's "particularly notorious," played there as a teenager. Jazz critic Nat Hentoff recalled sneaking into Izzy Ort's ("a terrible joint") as a youth to see the 15-year-old Braff perform. That night Benny Goodman, who had been playing at the RKO Theater next door, was drawn to Izzy Ort's by the sound of Braff's playing. Goodman asked Braff to join him on the road, but the boy's mother insisted he finish high school.

Other musicians who played there include Sam Rivers ("You'd get the Navy and the Marines in there, and they could destroy the place in five minutes"), Hal Galper ("The safest place was on the bandstand"), Dick Johnson, Jaki Byard, Roy Haynes, Nat Pierce, Herb Pomeroy, Dick Twardzik, and Larry Willis.

Popular entertainer Sammy Davis Jr., who lived for several years in Boston's South End, reminisced years later about "hoofing and singing" at Izzy Ort's.

Eddie Cantor and Jimmy Durante, friends of Ort's from his New York days, often dropped by to visit when they were in Boston. In 1964, evangelist Billy Graham made headlines when he addressed the crowd at Izzy Ort's, inviting them to a gospel lecture he was giving later that night at Boston Garden.

Alyce Mills Johnson, a former dancer with Cab Calloway's orchestra, was Izzy Ort's first black entertainer. She worked as an emcee at Izzy Ort's from 1938 to 1941. In a 1977 interview, Johnson recalled Ort fondly, saying, "He was a fine and generous man."
