= Wilbur Mills =

American politician (1909–1992)

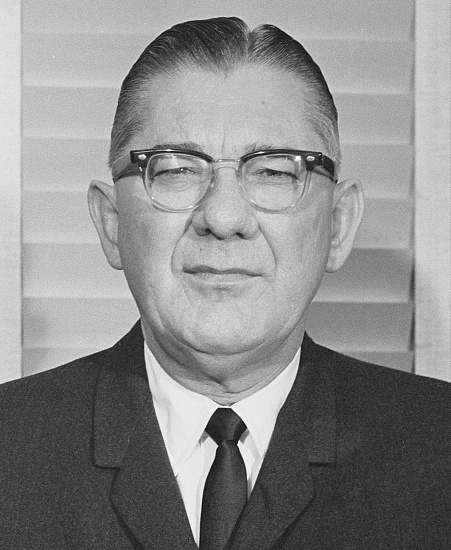

Chair of the House Ways and Means Committee
- In office January 7, 1958 – December 10, 1974
- Preceded by: Jere Cooper
- Succeeded by: Al Ullman

Member of the U.S. House of Representatives from Arkansas's 2nd district
- In office January 3, 1939 – January 3, 1977
- Preceded by: John E. Miller
- Succeeded by: Jim Guy Tucker

Personal details
- Born: Wilbur Daigh Mills; May 24, 1909 Kensett, Arkansas, U.S.
- Died: May 2, 1992 (aged 82) Searcy, Arkansas, U.S.
- Party: Democratic
- Spouse: Clarine Billingsley (m. 1934)
- Education: Hendrix College; Harvard University

Wilbur Daigh Mills (May 24, 1909 – May 2, 1992) was an American Democratic politician and lawyer who represented Arkansas's 2nd congressional district in the United States House of Representatives from 1939 until his retirement in 1977. As chairman of the House Ways and Means Committee from 1958 to 1974, he was often called "the most powerful man in Washington".

Born in Kensett, Arkansas, Mills began a legal career after attending Harvard Law School. He served as the youngest ever county judge of his native White County, Arkansas, then won election to the U.S. House of Representatives in 1938, the youngest elected from Arkansas. As the youngest chairman of the Ways and Means Committee, Mills was the Congressional architect in establishing Medicare. He was also the architect of the Tax Reform Act of 1969, lowering rates on the poor, raising rates on the rich, and creating the alternative minimum tax, as well as a strong advocate for infrastructure projects, especially the Interstate Highway System. Mills' name was entered in a few states in the 1972 Democratic Party presidential primaries, championing an automatic cost of living adjustment to Social Security, to mixed electoral results in the primaries.

After two public incidents with a stripper named Fanne Foxe, Mills stepped down as Chair of the Ways and Means and checked into the Palm Beach Institute for Alcoholism for three months and he declined to seek re-election in 1976, even though he had received more than 59% of the vote for re-election after the first incident. After leaving office, he returned to the practice of law and helped establish a center for the treatment of alcoholism, the Wilbur D. Mills Center for Alcoholism and Drug Treatment Center, while supporting similar centers around the country in their fundraising efforts.

== Youth and early political life ==
Mills was born in Kensett, Arkansas, to Abbie Lois Daigh Mills and Ardra Pickens Mills. Kensett was the first public school in Arkansas to integrate under Mills's father, who was first superintendent, then chairman of the school board, and the banker for the school district. Mills attended public schools in Kensett but graduated as valedictorian from Searcy High School in Searcy, the county seat of White County. He thereafter graduated from Hendrix College in Conway, Arkansas, as salutatorian, having resided in Martin Hall. He studied constitutional law at Harvard Law School under Felix Frankfurter, who later was nominated and confirmed (1939) as an associate justice of the United States Supreme Court. Mills returned to Arkansas to run his father's bank and assist with the store during the Great Depression and was soon admitted to the Arkansas Bar Association in 1933.

Mills served as the 29th county judge of White County between 1935 and 1939, and began a small Medicare-like, county-funded program, with a $5,000 fund to pay for medical bills (equivalent to $116,000 in 2025), prescription drugs which were sold at cost, and hospital treatment for the indigent, which were lowered to $2.50 per day (equivalent to $58 in 2025), as well as having doctors see qualified patients free of charge. Patients were qualified for the program through petitioning the local justice of the peace, who in turn made a recommendation to Mills as county judge.

== In Congress ==
=== House Ways and Means Committee ===
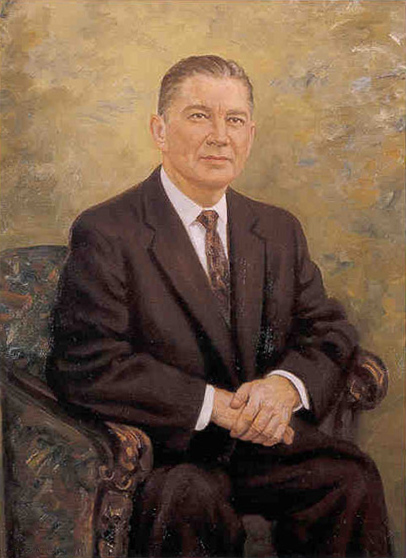
Mills' official House portrait

Mills served in the U.S. House of Representatives from 1939 to 1977, including 17 years (1958–1974) as chairman of the powerful House Ways and Means Committee, a post he held longer than any other person in U.S. history. Mills was often termed "the most powerful man in Washington" during his tenure. He was a signatory to the 1956 Southern Manifesto opposing the desegregation of public schools ordered by the Supreme Court in Brown v. Board of Education. However, Mills was never a segregationist personally: always a strong advocate for inclusion, his longest and closest aide was Walter Little, a black man from North Carolina. Mills told House Speaker Sam Rayburn that he was not going to sign the Manifesto, to which Rayburn responded by advising him that he would be defeated for re-election if he did not sign, so Mills ultimately did.

Mills's accomplishments in Congress included playing a large role in creating the Highway Trust Fund, opening up economic development through commerce between rivers and railroads, and then first creating the Kerr–Mills Health Insurance legislation, and then being the Congressional architect of the Medicare and Medicaid programs. Mills initially had reservations about the program because he was worried about the eventual cost, especially since the early proposals by the President and some Members of Congress proposed funding Medicare from the Social Security Trust Fund. Mills expected correctly that health care costs would continue to rise dramatically over time and, thus, would bankrupt Social Security. He saw Social Security, Medicare, and Medicaid as programs that people need to rely on and it would be economically, psychologically, and politically devastating to terminate. Mills was also acknowledged as the primary tax expert in Congress and the leading architect of the Tax Reform Act of 1969. Mills favored a conservative fiscal approach, adequate tax revenue to fund government programs, a balanced budget, while also supporting various social programs, especially Social Security and Disability, adding farmers and public employees to Social Security, unemployment compensation, and national health insurance.

In 1967, when President Lyndon B. Johnson required funds to support the cost of escalating the Vietnam War, Mills refused to support Johnson's proposed surtax and demanded that any tax increases be matched by equivalent cuts in federal spending. Johnson accepted his challenge and balanced the federal budget during his last fiscal year as president. Mills congratulated him, as he had actually cut more spending even than Mills had demanded. Mills and Johnson often laughed about Mills forcing a big spender to become the first president in decades to not only balance the budget but to start paying down the national debt. As the next (and most recent) president to balance the budget was Bill Clinton, some Arkansans have bragged, "It takes an Arkansan to balance the federal budget and to pay down the federal debt.

=== Presidential candidate ===
Mills was drafted by friends and fellow Congressmen to make himself available as a candidate for president of the United States in 1972 in a few of the Democratic primaries. He was not strong in the primaries and won 33 votes for president from the delegates at the 1972 Democratic National Convention, which nominated Senator George McGovern. His name was mentioned as a possible Treasury Secretary in a McGovern administration.

== Scandal, alcoholism, recovery and retirement ==
Mills was involved in a traffic incident in Washington, D.C. at 2 a.m. on October 7, 1974. U.S. Park Police stopped his car late at night because his driver had not activated the vehicle's headlights. Mills was intoxicated, and his face was injured following a scuffle with Annabelle Battistella, better known as Fanne Foxe, a stripper from Argentina. When police approached the car, Foxe leapt from the vehicle and jumped into the nearby Tidal Basin. She was taken to St. Elizabeths Hospital, a psychiatric facility, for treatment. The Park Police took Mills to his home. Despite the scandal, Mills was re-elected in November 1974 in a heavily Democratic year with nearly 60% of the vote, defeating Republican Judy Petty. On November 30, 1974, Mills, seemingly drunk, was accompanied by Eduardo Battistella, Fanne Foxe's husband, onstage at The Pilgrim Theatre in Boston, where Foxe was performing. He held a press conference from Foxe's dressing room. Mills stepped down from his chairmanship of the Ways and Means Committee, acknowledged his alcoholism, joined Alcoholics Anonymous, and checked himself in to the Palm Beach Institute in West Palm Beach, Florida for two months, where he was joined in treatment by Mrs. Mills. Mills chose not to run for re-election in 1976, and to continue to devote himself to his recovery and his work with other alcoholics in public office. He was succeeded by a family friend, Democrat Jim Guy Tucker. Thereafter, Mills practiced tax law at the Washington office of the prestigious New York law firm Shea and Gould until he retired in 1991. He moved back to Arkansas to work on the continued development, including a new campus, of the Wilbur D. Mills Treatment Center for Alcoholism, the University of Arkansas for Medical Sciences's Wilbur D. Mills Endowed Chairs on Alcoholism and Drug Abuse, and the Masonic Grand Lodge's capital fundraising campaign.

Mills died in Searcy, Arkansas in 1992. He is interred at Kensett Cemetery in Kensett, Arkansas.

== Personal life ==
Wilbur was married to Clarine "Polly" Billingsley Mills for almost 58 years from 1934 until his death in 1992; she died on October 16, 2001. They are interred side by side at the Kensett Cemetery.

== Honors ==
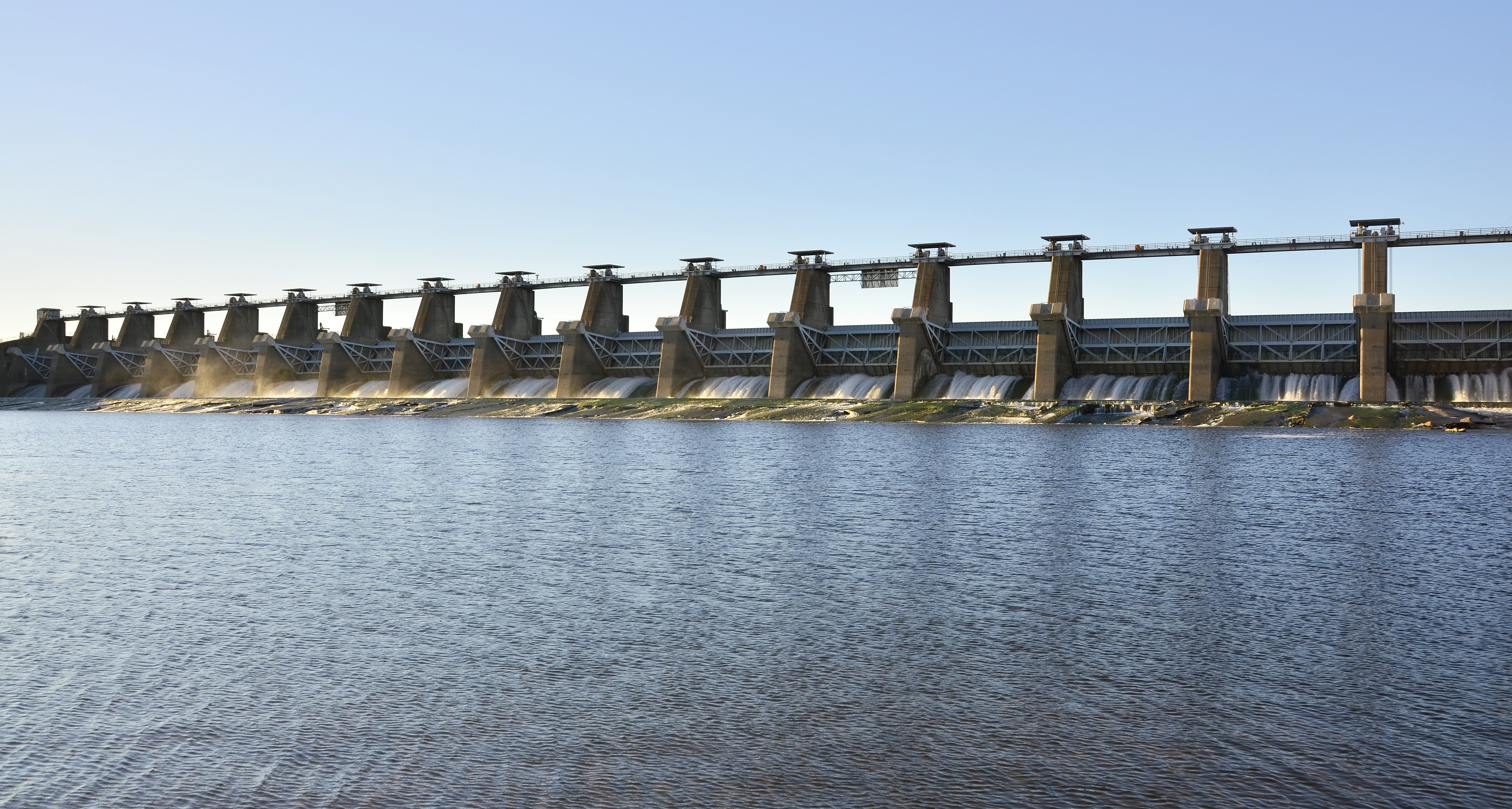
Wilbur D. Mills Dam

Various schools, highways, and other structures in Arkansas are named for Mills:

- Wilbur D. Mills University Studies High School in Sweet Home, Pulaski County, Arkansas
- Wilbur D. Mills Treatment Center for Alcoholism and Drug Abuse, Searcy, Arkansas
- Wilbur D. Mills Dam on the Arkansas River in Arkansas County and Desha County, Arkansas
- Wilbur D. Mills Campgrounds, Tichnor, Arkansas
- Wilbur D. Mills Freeway in Little Rock, Arkansas (Interstate 630)
- Wilbur D. Mills Avenue in Kensett, Arkansas
- Wilbur D. Mills Park in Bryant, Arkansas
- Wilbur D. Mills Center, Hendrix College, Conway, Arkansas
- Two Wilbur D. Mills Endowed Chairs on Alcoholism and Drug Abuse, university of *Arkansas Medical Science Campus
- Wilbur D. Mills Education Services Cooperative, Beebe, Arkansas
- Mills Park Road, Bryant, Arkansas
- Mills Street, Walnut Ridge, Arkansas
- Wilbur D. Mills Courts Building, Searcy, Arkansas
- Wilbur D. Mills Library, Arkansas School for the Deaf, Little Rock, Arkansas

Sculptures of Mills are located at:

- Arkansas State Capitol
- Hendrix College, Mills Building, Mills Congressional Office Replica
- Wilbur D. Mills University Studies High School, Sweet Home, Arkansas
- Wilbur Mills Treatment Center, Searcy, Arkansas
- Boswell Law Office, Bryant, Arkansas
- Kay Goss Office, Alexandria, Virginia
- John F. Kennedy Park, Greers Ferry Lock and Dam, Heber Springs, Arkansas

U.S. House of Representatives
Preceded by John Miller	Member of the U.S. House of Representatives from Arkansas's 2nd congressional district 1939–1977	Succeeded by Jim Tucker
Preceded by Jere Cooper	Chairperson of the House Ways and Means Committee; 1958–1974	Succeeded by Al Ullman
