= Moses Kimball =

Politician in Massachusetts, US (1809–1895)

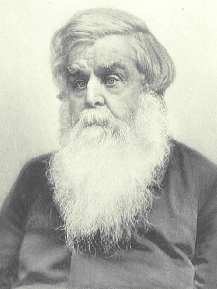

Member of the Massachusetts House of Representatives
- In office 1851–1852
- In office 1860–1861
- Constituency: 10th Suffolk district
- In office January 6, 1864 – January 4, 1865
- Constituency: 10th Suffolk district
- In office January 2, 1867 – January 1, 1868
- Constituency: 8th Suffolk district
- In office January 6, 1869 – January 4, 1870
- Constituency: 8th Suffolk district
- In office January 4, 1871 – January 1873
- Constituency: 8th Suffolk district
- In office January 7, 1874 – January 2, 1877
- Constituency: 9th Suffolk district

Member of the Boston Board of Aldermen
- In office 1850–1852

Personal details
- Born: October 24, 1809 Newburyport, Massachusetts
- Died: February 21, 1895 (aged 85) Boston, Massachusetts
- Party: Whig; Republican
- Spouse: Frances Lavinia Hathaway
- Children: Margaret Kimball (b. October 19, 1841-d. July 14, 1922)
- for the 9th Suffolk District (1876)

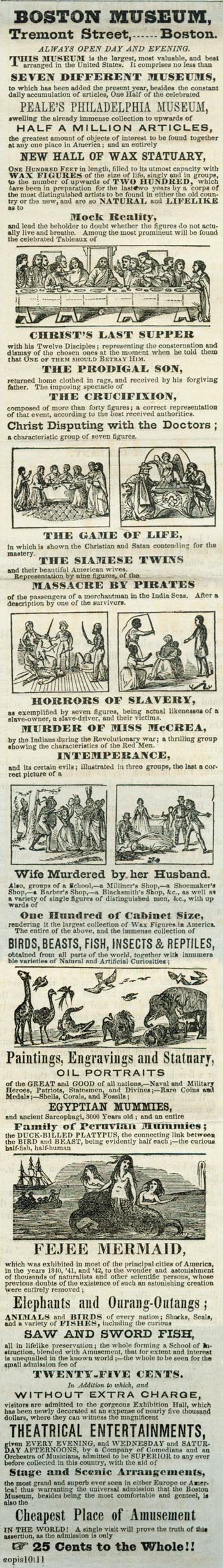
Newspaper advertisement for the Boston Museum, by Moses Kimball, from the Barre Patriot, Barre, Vermont, 15 September 1850.

Moses Kimball (October 24, 1809 – February 21, 1895) was an American politician, museum curator and owner, and showman. Kimball was a business rival and close associate of P. T. Barnum and public-spirited citizen of Boston, Massachusetts who represented the city in the Massachusetts General Court for several non-consecutive terms from 1851 and 1877 and made several runs for mayor.

== Biography ==
Kimball was descended from Richard and Ursula Kimball, who came from England to Massachusetts in 1634 and were among the founders of the town of Ipswich, Massachusetts. Kimball was born in Ipswich to David and Nancy (Stacy) Kimball, and raised in Rockport, Massachusetts but moved to Boston at 15 to seek his fortune. He was ruined first in the "Eastern Land" speculation, and then again in 1833 in his purchase of the New England Galaxy, one of the earliest weekly newspapers of Boston, which was sold after a few months at a serious loss. Kimball married Frances L. A. Hathaway on June 25, 1834, and in 1836 started the New England Printing Company but it collapsed in 1837.

In 1838 Kimball purchased most of the New England Museum, added to it, made arrangements for a lease of the building on Tremont and Bromfield streets (later the site of the Horticultural Hall).

In 1840, Kimball travelled just twenty miles northwest to the new mill city, Lowell, MA and founded the Lowell Museum.

Then in 1841, Moses opened the Boston Museum. The museum, rebuilt in 1846 and 1880, displayed a large number of stuffed birds and animals (later owned by the Boston Society of Natural History), several remains of Greek sculpture (now in the Museum of Fine Arts, Boston), and several historical portraits by John Singleton Copley. The Museum was immediately successful.

In the late spring of 1842, Kimball traveled to New York City to meet his rival, P. T. Barnum, in person. He brought with him a large oblong box containing a most unusual curiosity: an embalmed mermaid purchased at great price near Calcutta by a Boston sea captain in 1817. If it wasn't a real mermaid, it was a remarkable fraud: the head of a baboon and the upper half of an orangutan was attached to the lower half of a large fish.

On June 18, Barnum and Kimball entered into a written agreement to exploit this "curiosity supposed to be a mermaid." Kimball would remain the creature's sole owner and Barnum would lease it for $12.50 a week. Barnum christened his artifact "The Fejee Mermaid" and began to "puff" her to the skies.

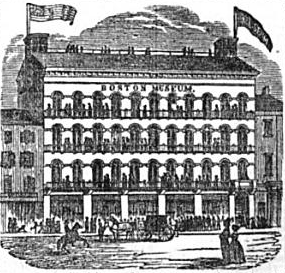
Boston Museum in 1851

By 1843, Kimball and P. T. Barnum were on the best of terms, and trading objects from their collections frequently. That same year they bought Charles Willson Peale's Philadelphia Museum for $7,000 when it went out of business, and Barnum wrote to Kimball about the death of a prized live orangutan:

I am grieved vexed and disappointed [?] hear of the sickness and death (for I know she will die) of the Ourang Outang. D--n the luck—I have puffed he[r] high and dry—got a large transparency and a flag 10 [?] 16 feet painted for her—besides newspaper cut [?] and now curse her—she must up foot and die.

— P. T. Barnum to Moses Kimball, September 1, 1843, Boston Athenaeum.

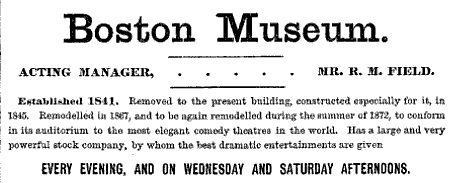
Boston Museum advertisement from 1872

That same year, Kimball added a theater to his museum, although he called it a "lecture-room" in deference to the Puritan feeling in Boston. There he staged his own adaptations of Uncle Tom's Cabin among other productions.

=== Political life ===
As Kimball's fortune grew, he became an active public citizen. His first appearance in political life was in 1844, as a consequence of a speech by Daniel Webster, in which he urged the revision of the US naturalization laws in reaction to the Irish vote. As early as 1850, he offered a prize for the best essay on the treatment and prevention of croup.

Kimball served in both chambers of the Boston City Council. In 1849 and 1850 Kimball was elected as a member of the Boston Common Council from Ward 10, serving in 1850 and 1851. In 1851 he was elected to the Boston Board of Aldermen, serving as a member in 1852.

While never elected to the office, Kimball ran three times for mayor of the City of Boston. In 1858 he garnered 4,449 votes while losing to Frederic W. Lincoln Jr. In 1860 Kimball ran as the Republican Party candidate, for Mayor of the city of Boston losing to Joseph Wightman. On that day, December 13, 1860, Kimball received 5,674 votes to Wightman's 8,834 votes. In 1868 he once again ran for Mayor, losing to Nathaniel Bradstreet Shurtleff, Sr. (Kimball received 9,156 votes to Shurtleff's 11,005 votes.)

=== Later years ===
Twenty years later, he established a prize for the best exhibit of shade trees set out in the streets of Rockport, Massachusetts, and for the best loaf of bread exhibited at the annual fair. Kimball made three journeys to Europe, in 1867, 1872 and 1877 to 1878. In 1879 Kimball donated to Boston a copy of Thomas Ball's sculpture Emancipation Group. Sited in Park Square it depicts an emancipated slave rising at the feet of Abraham Lincoln (Ball was a former employee of Kimball's.) In his will he left $5,000 for the Massachusetts Institute of Technology.

== Death ==
Moses Kimball died in 1895, aged 85. In 1903 the famous Boston Museum was swept away.

== See also ==
- 1872 Massachusetts legislature
- 1874 Massachusetts legislature
- 1875 Massachusetts legislature
- 1876 Massachusetts legislature

== Bibliography ==
- A Manual for the Use of the General Court by Stephen Nye Gifford (1864) p. 204.
- A Manual for the Use of the General Court by Stephen Nye Gifford (1876) p. 332.
- Acts and Resolves Passed by the General Court by the Secretary of the Commonwealth (1867) p. 859.
- Laura Keene v. Moses Kimball. Reports of cases argued and determined in the Supreme Judicial Court of the Commonwealth of Massachusetts. Nov. 1860. Google books
- Memorial Biographies of the New England Historic Genealogical Society v. 9 (1890–97), Boston, MA: New England Historic Genealogical Society, 1908, p. 240.
- The New England Historical and Genealogical Register Vol XLIV. By Henry Fritz-Gilbert Waters (1895).
- Proceedings of the New England Historic Genealogical Society at the Annual Meeting, 7 February 1923 By New England Historic Genealogical Society (1923).
