= 1860 Boston mayoral election =

Election in Massachusetts, United States

- December 10, 1860
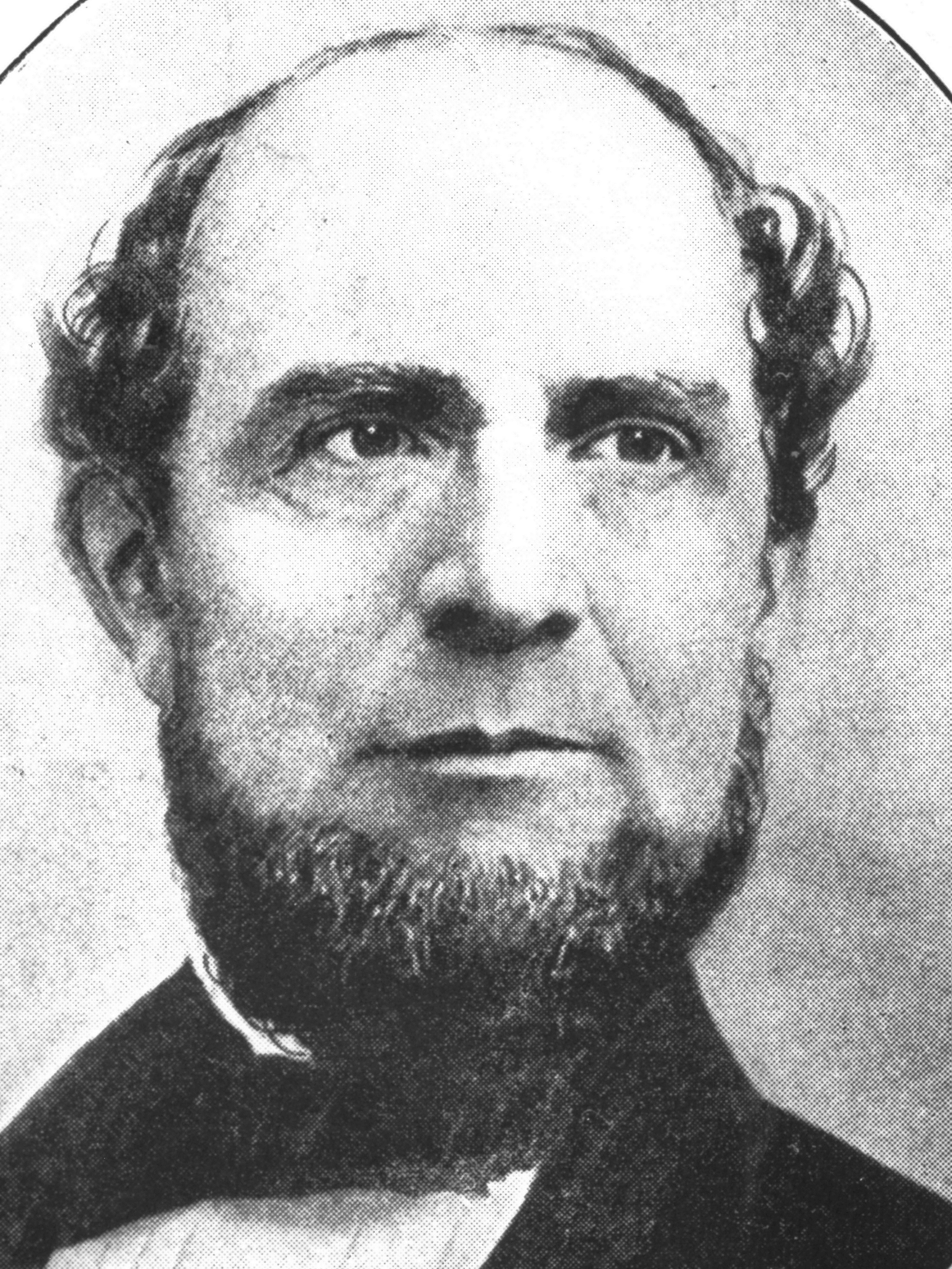

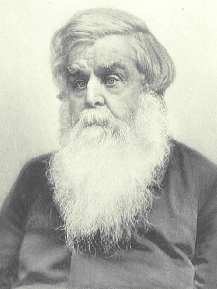
Candidate	Joseph Wightman	Moses Kimball
Party	Democratic	Republican
Popular vote	8,834	5,674
Percentage	60.43%	38.81%
Mayor before election
Frederic W. Lincoln Jr.
Elected mayor
Joseph Wightman
Democratic

The Boston mayoral election of 1860 saw the election of Democratic Party nominee Joseph Wightman. This was the first Boston mayoral election won by a Democratic Party nominee. It was held on December 10, 1860.

Wightman was nominated by both the Democratic and Union tickets. His opponent, Moses Kimball, was nominated by the Republican Party.

== Results ==
1860 Boston mayoral election
Party	Candidate	Votes	%
Democratic	Joseph Wightman	8,834	60.43
Republican	Moses Kimball	5,674	38.81
Other	Scattering	111	0.76
Turnout		14,619	100

== See also ==
- List of mayors of Boston, Massachusetts
