= Joseph A. Conry =

American politician (1868–1943)

Joseph Aloysius Conry
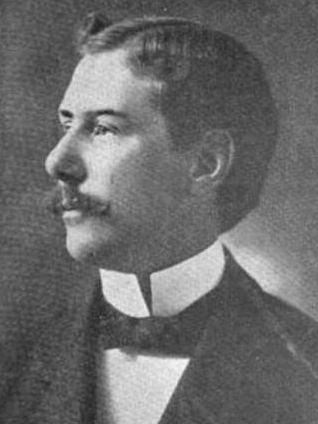

Director of the Port of Boston
- In office 1911–1916

Consul of Russia to the United States
- In office 1912–1919
- Monarch: Nicholas II

Member of the U.S. House of Representatives from Massachusetts's 9th district
- In office March 4, 1901 – March 3, 1903
- Preceded by: John F. Fitzgerald
- Succeeded by: John A. Keliher

Chairman of the Boston Board of Aldermen
- In office April 1, 1898 – October 1, 1898
- Preceded by: Perlie Appelton Dyar
- Succeeded by: David Franklin Barry

Member of the Boston Board of Aldermen
- In office 1898

President of the Boston Common Council
- In office 1896–1897
- Preceded by: Christopher Francis O'Brien
- Succeeded by: Timothy Lawrence Connolly

Member of the Boston Common Council from Ward 2
- In office 1895–1897
- Succeeded by: Joseph F. Hickey

Personal details
- Born: September 12, 1868 Brookline, Massachusetts, United States
- Died: June 22, 1943 (aged 74) Washington, D.C., United States
- Resting place: Mount Olivet Cemetery
- Party: Democratic

Joseph Aloysius Conry (September 12, 1868 – June 22, 1943) was an American politician who served as a United States representative from Massachusetts. Although he served only a single term, he received national attention for his reformist views. He remained a highly popular speaker and writer, despite losing an election to Congress in 1908. Before serving in Congress, he held municipal office in Boston.

Russia named him Consul to the United States in 1912, a position in which he served until 1919. He was also director of the Port of Boston from 1911 to 1916.

== Early career ==
Conry was born in Brookline, Massachusetts, on September 12, 1868. He attended the common schools, studied law, was admitted to the bar and commenced practice in Boston.

== Municipal government ==
Conry served from 1895 through 1897 as a member of the Boston Common Council from ward 2. He served as president of the Common Council in 1896 and 1897. Conry served on the Boston Board of Aldermen in 1898, and was the chairman of the board.

== United States Congress ==
Conry was elected as a Democrat to the United States House of Representatives for the 57th United States Congress (March 4, 1901 – March 3, 1903). He was an unsuccessful candidate for reelection in 1902 to the 58th United States Congress, and resumed the practice of his profession in Boston.

== Defeats in the 1908 congressional election ==
In 1908 Conry was an unsuccessful candidate for the Democratic congressional nomination in Massachusetts's 9th congressional district. Conry first lost in the Democratic primary, and in the general election as an independent candidate, losing both times to John A. Keliher.

== Consul to the United States from Russia ==
He was recognized as consul of Russia in September 1912 and served until 1919. Conry was decorated by Czar Nicholas II, and was made a member of the Knights of St. Anne.

== Later career ==
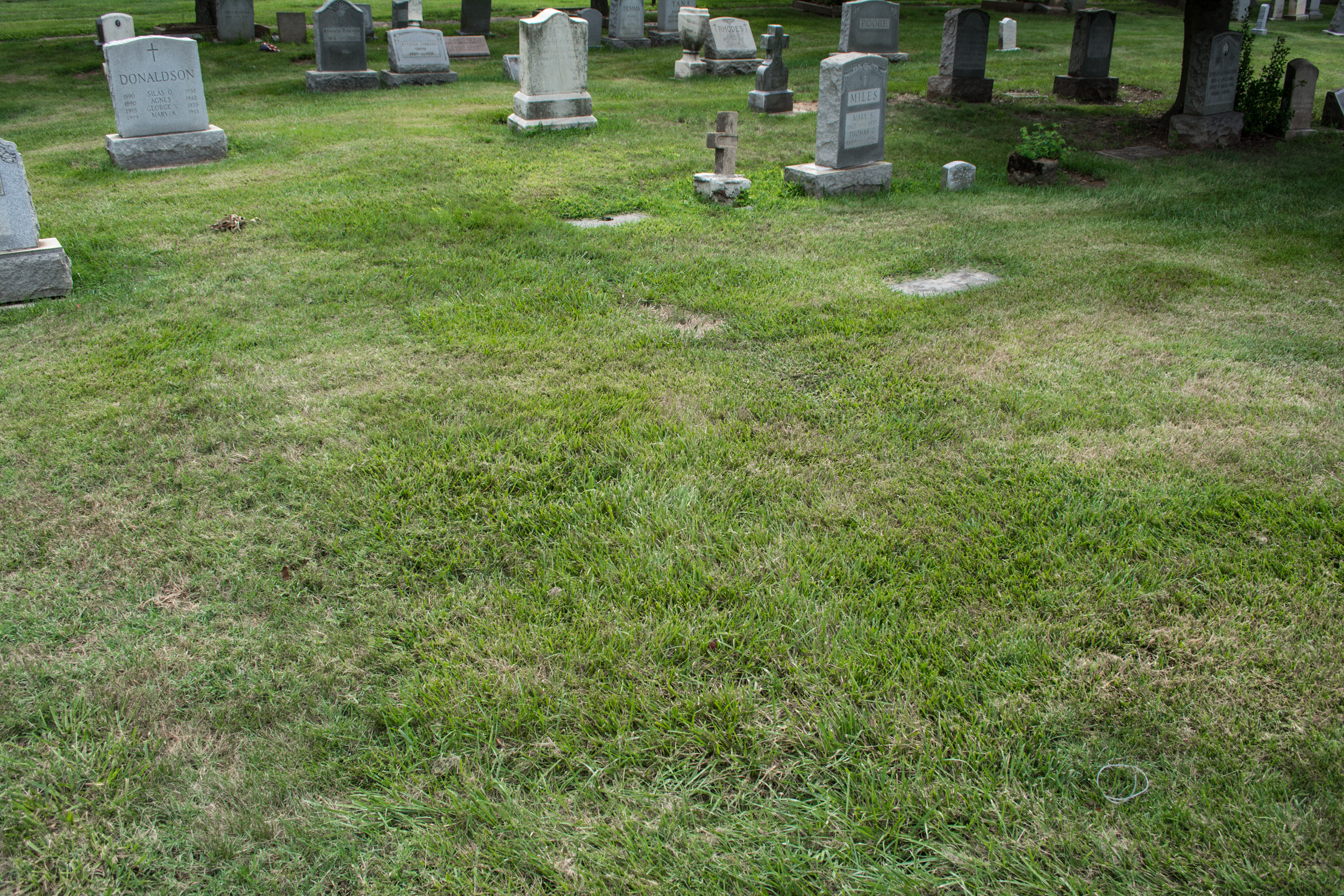
Unmarked grave of Joseph Conry at Mount Olivet Cemetery in Washington, D.C.

Conry served as director of the Port of Boston from 1911 to 1916. He served as special attorney for the United States Maritime Commission in Washington, D.C., in 1938 and 1939, then practiced law there.

== Death and burial ==
Conry died at George Washington University Hospital in Washington, D.C. June 22, 1943. He was interred at Mount Olivet Cemetery in Washington, D.C.

== Notes ==
Party political offices
Preceded by Joseph L. P. St. Coeur	Democratic nominee for Attorney General of Massachusetts; 1919	Succeeded by Michael L. Sullivan
Diplomatic posts
Preceded by	Counsel of Russia to the United States; September 1912 – 1919	Succeeded by
U.S. House of Representatives
Preceded by John F. Fitzgerald	Member of the U.S. House of Representatives from Massachusetts's 9th congressional district March 4, 1901 – March 3, 1903	Succeeded by John A. Keliher
Political offices
Preceded by Perlie Appelton Dyar	Chairman of the Boston, Massachusetts; Board of Aldermen; April 1, 1898 – October 1, 1898	Succeeded by David Franklin Barry
Preceded by Christopher Francis O'Brien	President of the Boston, Massachusetts; Common Council; 1896–1897	Succeeded by Timothy Lawrence Connolly
