= 1862 Boston mayoral election =

Election in Massachusetts, United States

- December 8, 1862
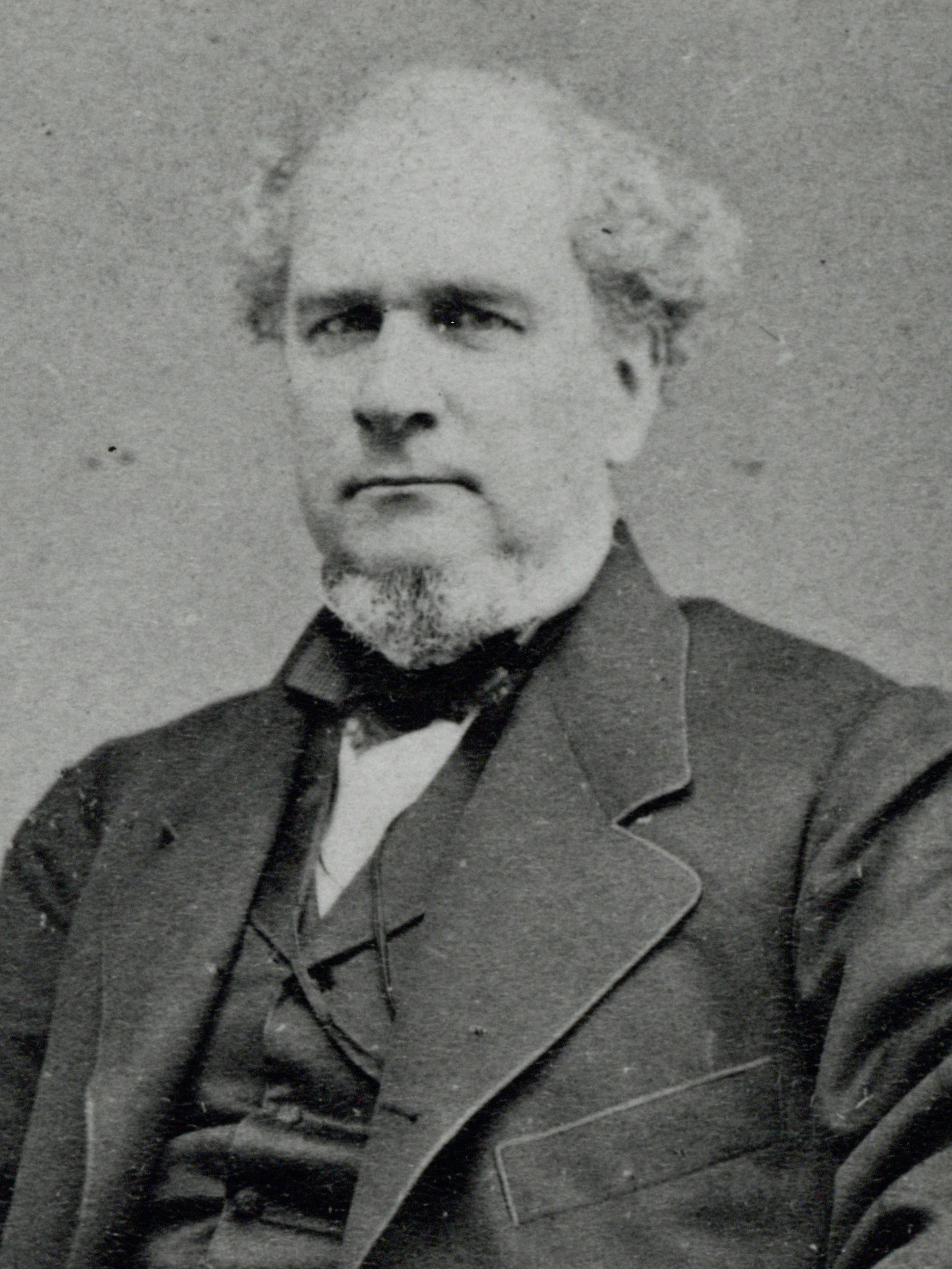

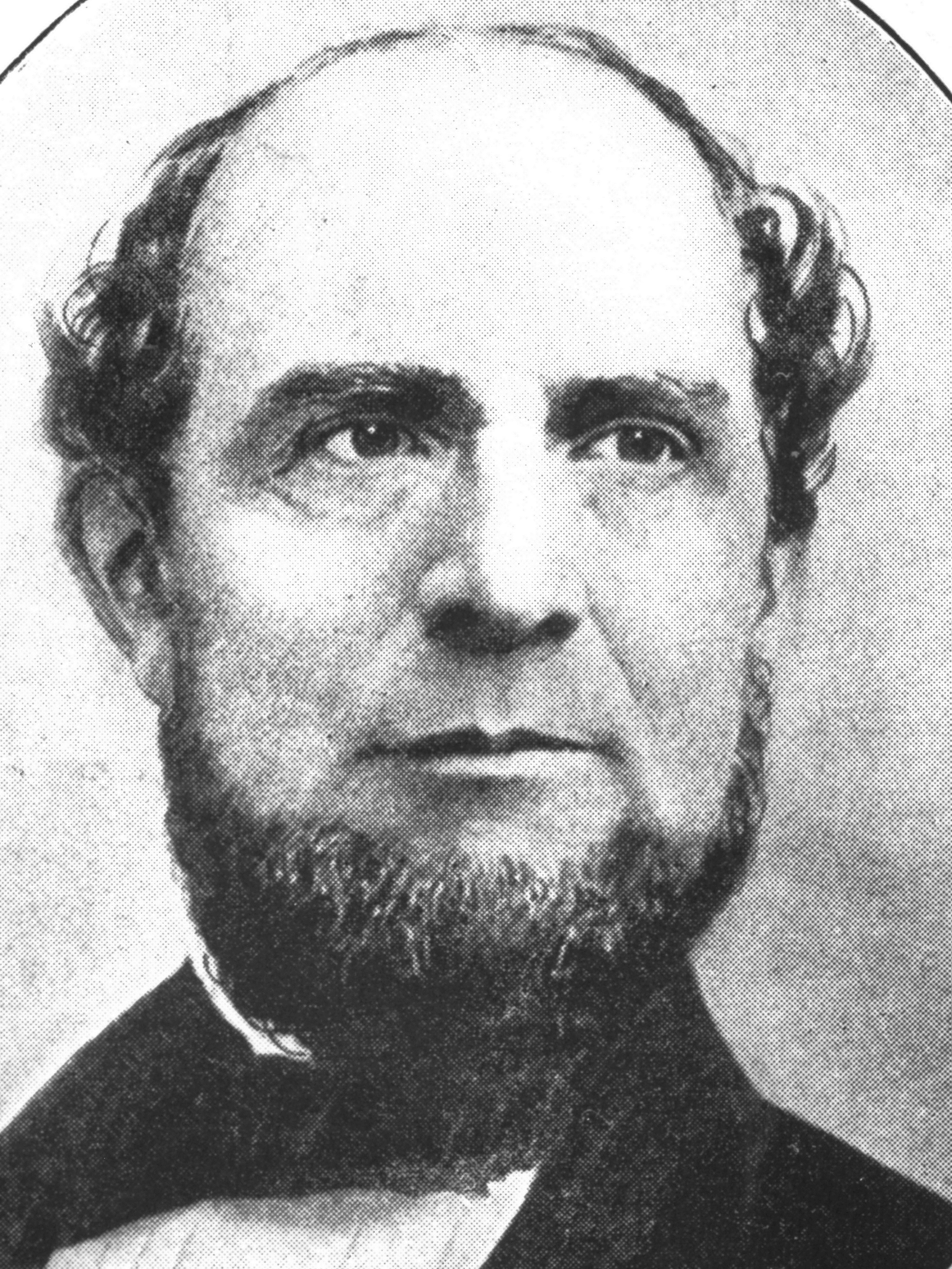
Candidate	Frederic W. Lincoln Jr.	Joseph Wightman
Party	Republican	Democratic
Popular vote	6,352	5,287
Percentage	54.47%	45.34%
Mayor before election
Joseph Wightman
Democratic
Elected mayor
Frederic W. Lincoln Jr.
Republican

The 1862 Boston mayoral election was held on December 8, and saw Frederic W. Lincoln Jr. be returned to the mayoralty for a fourth non-consecutive term, unseating incumbent mayor Joseph Wightman.

Lincoln was nominated on the Republican and Citizens' ticket, while Wightman was nominated on the Democratic and People's ticket.

== Results ==
1862 Boston mayoral election
Party	Candidate	Votes	%
Republican	Frederic W. Lincoln Jr.	6,352	54.47
Democratic	Joseph Wightman (incumbent)	5,287	45.34
Other	Scattering	22	0.19
Turnout		11,661	

== See also ==
- List of mayors of Boston, Massachusetts
