= Joseph Wightman =

American politician

Joseph Milner Wightman
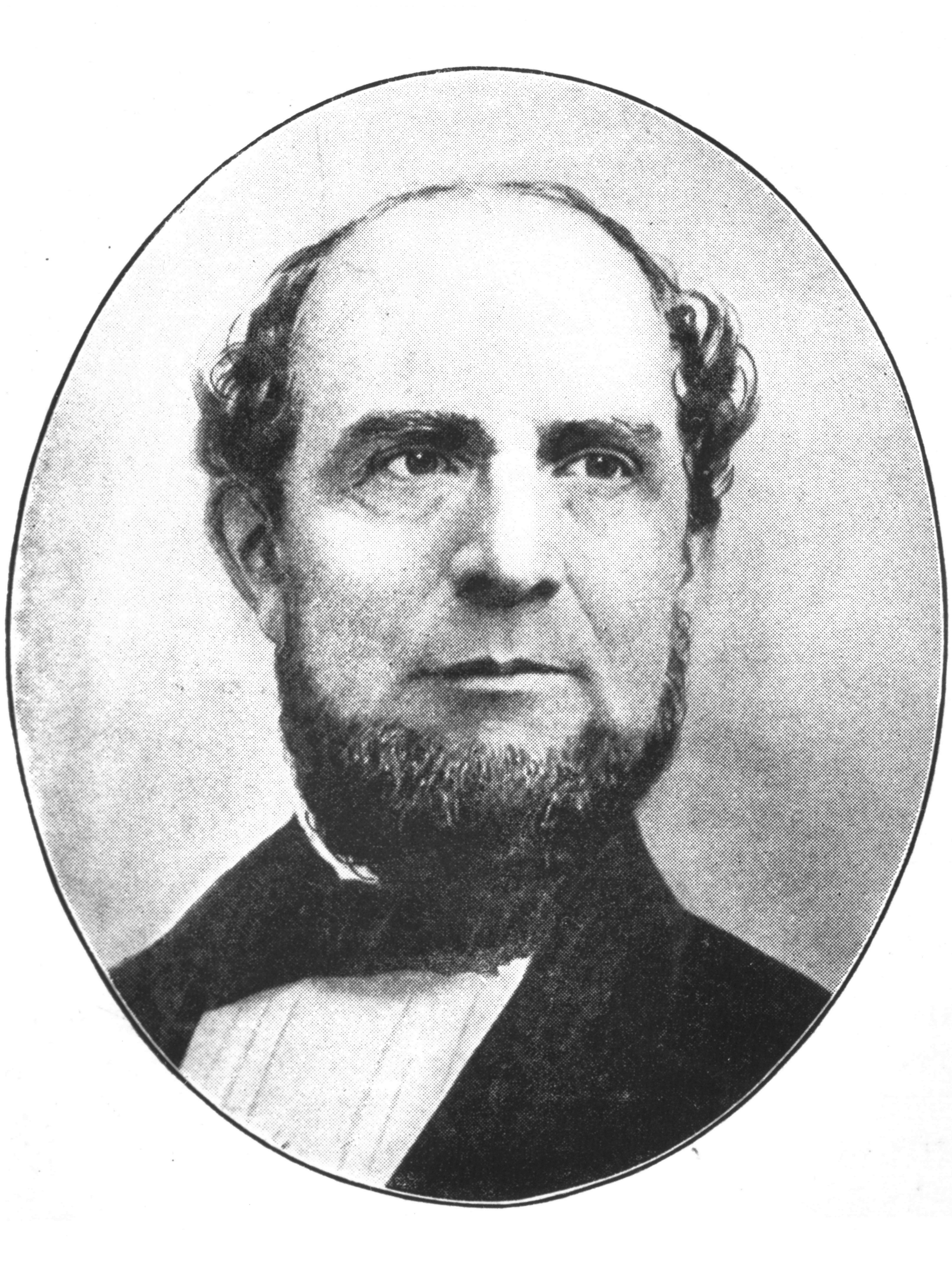

17th Mayor of Boston, Massachusetts
- In office January 7, 1861 – January 5, 1863
- Preceded by: Frederic W. Lincoln Jr.
- Succeeded by: Frederic W. Lincoln Jr.

Chairman of the Boston Board of Aldermen
- In office 1858–1859
- Preceded by: Pelham Bonney
- Succeeded by: Silas Peirce

City of Boston Member Board of Aldermen
- In office April 1856 – 1859
- Preceded by: Levi Benjamin Meriam

Representative Massachusetts House
- In office 1851–1851

Personal details
- Born: October 19, 1812 (United States) Boston, Massachusetts
- Died: January 25, 1885 (aged 72)
- Resting place: Mount Auburn Cemetery
- Party: Whig, Democrat
- Spouse: Berthia Morse
- Children: Mary Ellen, Joseph Claxton, Henry Morse, Berthia M., Sarah Ernestine, Gertrude E. and Florence Ada
- Profession: Manufacturer of Philosophical Apparatus, Attorney.

Joseph Milner Wightman (October 19, 1812 – January 25, 1885) was an American politician who, from 1861 to 1863, served as the seventeenth Mayor of Boston, Massachusetts.

== Early years ==
Wightman was born the son of an immigrant tailor at Elliot Street in Boston on October 19, 1812. His father died when he was 10; when he was 14 years old, Wightman became a machinist's apprentice. Wightman was apprenticed to a firm of mathematical and philosophical instrument makers owned by Mr. John Codman and Mr. Timothy Claxton. After his apprenticeship ended Wightman associated in business with Mr. Codman.

When he was 16, and still serving as an apprentice, Wightman made use of the Mechanic Apprentices' Library borrowing books on Mathematics and other subjects, so that he could study at night after his working hours. Through his use of the library, Wightman acquired a working knowledge of mensuration, chemistry and electrical engineering.

Wightman was able to benefit from these educational pursuits because one of his employers, Timothy Claxton, was an early innovator and supporter in providing educational opportunities for the working class.

Codman and Claxton's partnership lasted for only three years, after which time Timothy Claxton went into business for himself for three and a quarter years, after which he went into business with Wightman.

In the summer of 1835, Mr. Claxton's business was destroyed by a fire. Since Claxton was fully insured, he was able to rebuild, and, at that time, he went into partnership with Wightman, who Claxton described as his "right hand man".

On October 6, 1836, he married Berthia Morse (born 1812, the daughter of Aaron Morse and Sarah Johnson) in Boston, Mass. They had seven children (Mary Ellen, Joseph Claxton, Henry Morse (January 5, 1840, to April 3, 1885), Bethia M., Sarah Ernestine, Gertrude E. and Florence Ada).

In 1837, Claxton returned to his native country of England, Wightman took over the company, and the firm of Claxton and Wightman became the firm of Joseph M. Wightman, Wightman began to supply educational institutions with a large number of educational scientific instruments.

Wightman was well renowned in his field. In September 1837, Claxton and Wightman won a silver medal from the judges on Philosophical Instruments at Boston's First Mechanics' Fair. Wightman won a silver medal from the judges on Philosophical Instruments at the second fair held in September 1837, and a gold medal at the third fair held in September 1841.

== Early public service ==
=== City water supply improvement ===
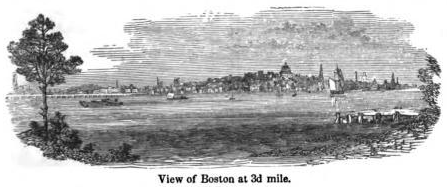
Boston Skyline Circa 1840s

In 1845 Wightman was the chairman of a citizens committee that worked to improve water delivery into the City of Boston, this resulted in the development of the Cochituate Water Works.

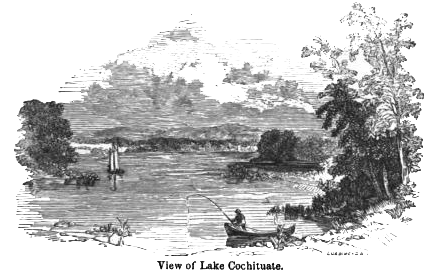
Lake Cochituate Circa 1847

=== Boston public schools ===
From 1846 to 1855 Wightman served as a member of the Boston Primary School Committee. On September 5, 1848, he was elected Chairman of the Executive Committee of the Boston Primary School Committee, (in place of Mr. Joseph Wentworth Ingraham who had died). Wightman served as Chairman of the Executive Committee of the Boston Primary School Committee until that committee was dissolved on January 2, 1855.

Wightman was also elected as a member of the Grammar School Committee (at the time there were two separate school committees one for the Primary schools and one for the Grammar Schools) Public school students would first attend a primary school for three years and then they would attend a grammar school.

==== Interests lead Wightman into politics ====
It has been said that Wightman's interest in the city's water supply and in improving education led him into politics. Indeed, he went from serving on the city's school committees, to the Massachusetts House of Representative, to the City of Boston's Board of Aldermen, serving at one point as its chairman, before going on to serve two terms as Mayor of the City of Boston.

== Ether anesthesia ==
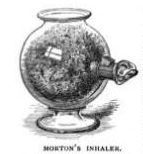
Ether Inhaler

Wightman, along with Nathan B. Chamberlain, developed the device used by William T.G. Morton to demonstrate the use of ether at Massachusetts General Hospital on October 16, 1846. This was one of the first successful demonstration of ether anesthesia (although his demonstration came after those of Dr. Crawford Long's in Georgia, Morton's demonstration was the first that was widely publicized).

== Massachusetts Charitable Mechanic Association ==
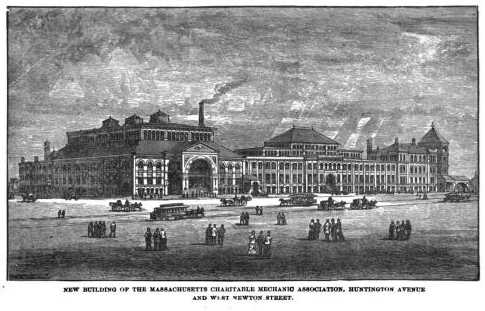
Boston's Mechanics' Hall

Wightman was very active in the Massachusetts Charitable Mechanic Association. Wightman was elected a trustee of the Association in 1850, he served as a trustee for three years. After serving as a trustee Wightman served for three years as vice president and the next three as president of the Massachusetts Charitable Mechanic Association.

On September 30, 1857, while serving as president of the Massachusetts Charitable Mechanic Association, Wight laid the cornerstone of Boston's Mechanics' Hall.

== Mayor of Boston ==
Wightman first ran for the office of Mayor in 1859, in that contest he received 4,208 votes out of 11,421 cast, however he lost to Frederic W. Lincoln Jr., who received 5,932 votes. In his second try Wightman was elected Boston's first Democratic Party Mayor on December 13, 1860. Wightman received 8,834 votes in his election bid vs. that of his closest competitor Republican Party candidate, former Alderman Moses Kimball, who received 5,674 votes. Wightman had been endorsed by both wings of the Democratic party and that of the Whigs.

On December 9, 1861 Wightman was reelected as Mayor receiving 6,765 votes vs. his closest competitor Edward Tobey, who received 5,795 votes (out of 12,565 votes cast).

Wightman again ran for reelection in 1862, Mayor Wightman was re-nominated by the People's Union Party on November 22, 1862, however on December 8, 1862, he lost to his predecessor Frederic W. Lincoln Jr. in his second reelection bid. Wightman received 5,287 votes to Lincoln's 6,352. Wightman's tenure as Boston's 17th Mayor ended on January 5, 1863, when Mayor Lincoln was sworn in as the 18th Mayor of the City of Boston.

=== City Hall construction ===
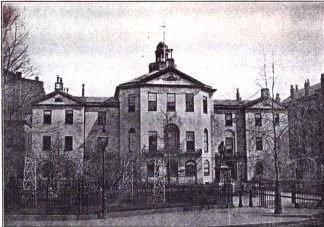
Boston's City Hall 1841 to 1865

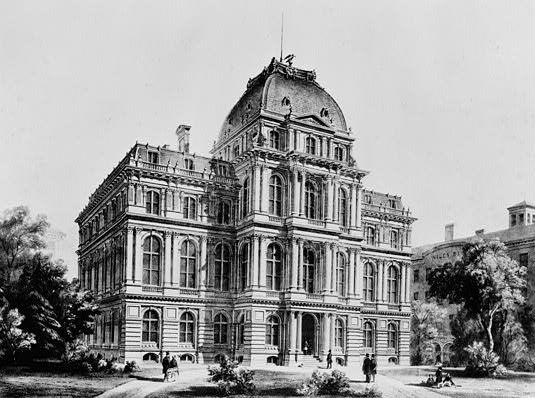
Boston's City Hall 1865 to 1969

Mayor Wightman was instrumental in the construction of a new Boston City Hall. In his Inaugural Address Wightman called for the construction of "a new City Hall of sufficient size to accommodate all the departments of the government." He laid the cornerstone of the city hall building at the stone laying ceremony of December 22, 1862. The city was, as he said, "the first building, therefore, which has been built and specially designed for municipal purposes".

=== Tremont Temple anti-slavery disturbance ===
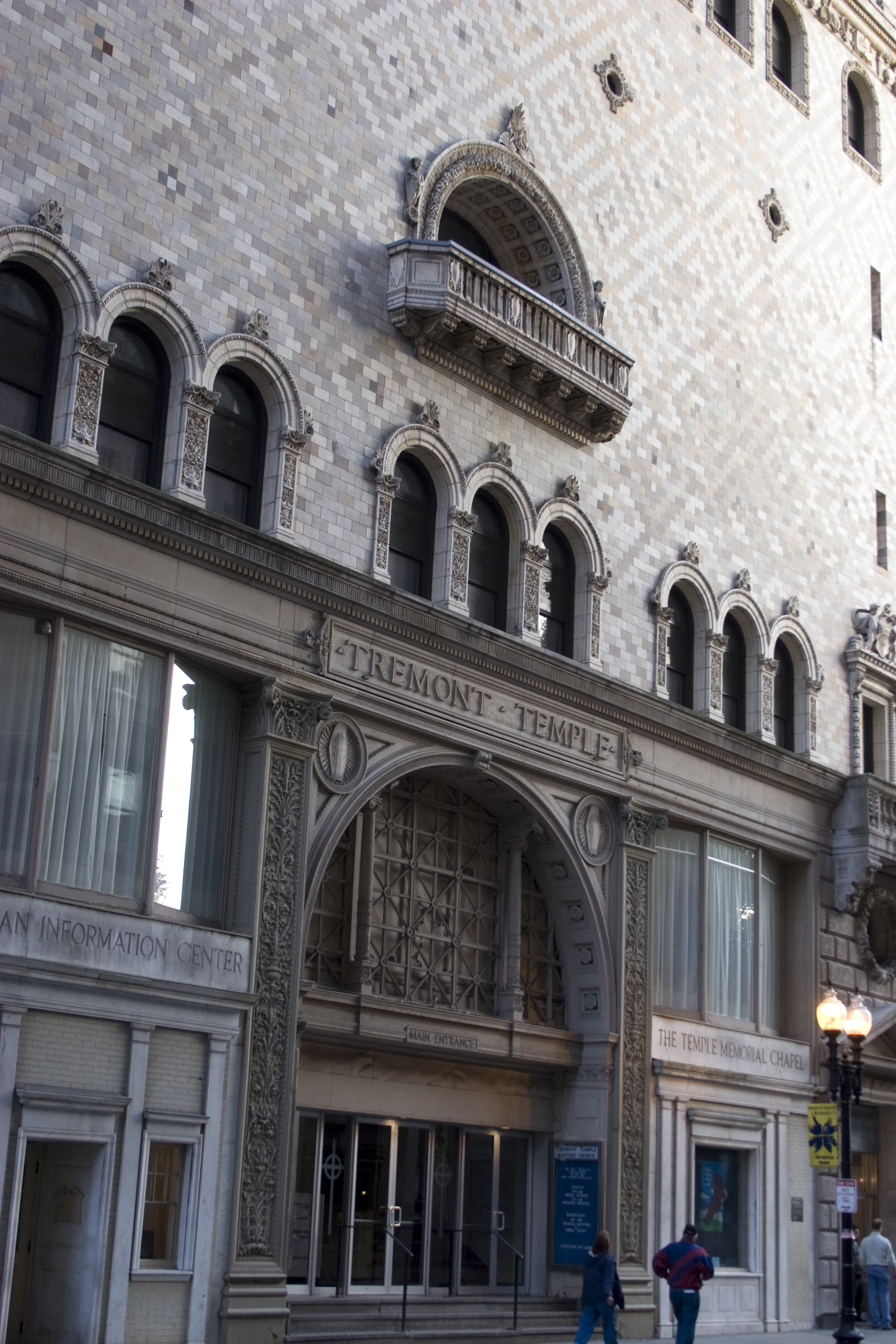
Tremont Temple

On January 24, 1861, the Massachusetts Anti-Slavery Society was holding its annual meeting at Tremont Temple in Boston. A group of anti-abolitionists attacked the meeting. The police protection that had been granted to the meeting was inadequate to prevent rioting. Mayor Wightman entered the meeting and ordered the hall closed, Mayor Wightman had entered the hall with a group of policemen and members of the Board of Aldermen, upon entering the meeting place Mayor Wightman announced that the trustees of the building had asked him to dissolve the meeting, the trustees, who were in attendance, denied that they asked for the meeting to be dissolved and asked Mayor Wightman to read their letter, the letter was actually shown to be a request to protect the assembly. Mayor Wightman promised the chairman of the meeting Edmund Quincy that he would protect the evening session with fifty policemen, but he later had the meeting doors closed and blocked by police. Mayor Wightman ended the meeting withdrew his offer of police protection and ordered the hall closed,

=== Fort Warren Military Prison ===
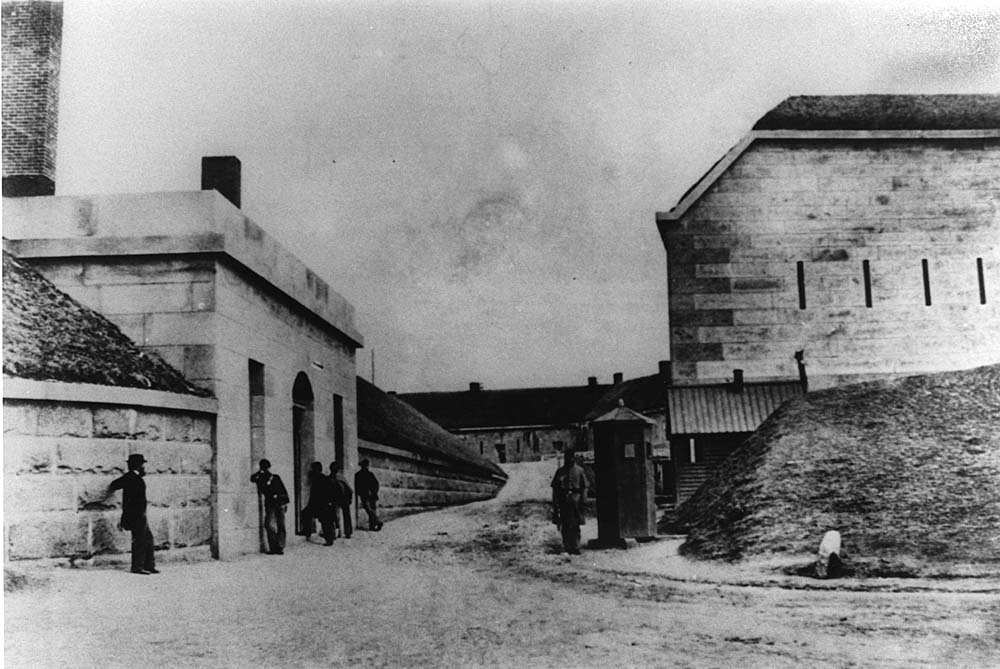
Fort Warren guardhouse (left) and sentry box (right) about 1861

On October 30, 1861, the military base in Boston Harbor known as Fort Warren began to house prisoners from the Confederate army as well as political prisoners. Initially, the United States Quartermaster in Boston, Captain George A. Kensel, was told to prepare for 100 prisoners, however when The State of Maine, the ship holding the prisoners, arrived it had on board 155 political prisoners and over 600 military prisoners for the fort. In early November 1861 Mayor Wightman visited the fort and decided that immediate steps had to be taken to alleviate the situation.

Local newspapers had urged that local citizens donate items to assist the prisoners at the fort. Mayor Wightman endorsed giving aid to the prisoners at the fort.

Mayor Wightman arranged for stores be delivered from Evans House a charity that had been established to assist Union servicemen. The Mayor's actions were met with mixed reaction from the local Press. The Boston Daily Advertiser and The Boston Transcript attacked Wightman. The Boston Evening Traveler, in opposing Wightman's reelection, called his distribution of supplies to the fort, aid to the "traitors at Fort Warren". However The Boston Post and The Boston Journal supported Wightman. The Boston Post said that Wightman had acted out of a charity and The Boston Journal supported Wightman in an editorial titled "The Transcript on Humanity".

=== City Hospital ===
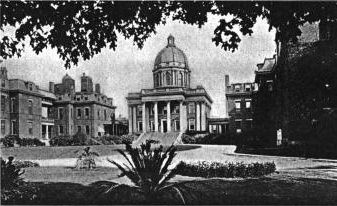
Boston City Hospital 1916

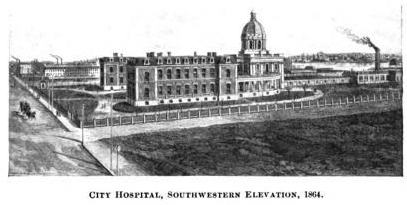
Boston City Hospital 1864

In 1857 Wightman was chairman of the special committee on the Free City Hospital.

During his term, on September 9, 1861, ground was broken for the construction of the City Hospital.

=== Mayor Wightman's tenure ===
Wightman's tenure of Mayor was said to concentrate on alleviating the wants of the Union Soldiers in the field. While he was Mayor Wightman successfully supplied funds for the fitting out of, and providing sustenance to, the soldiers in the field.

Wightman also arranged to remit, through him, funds from the soldiers pay to their families.

== Run for Congress ==
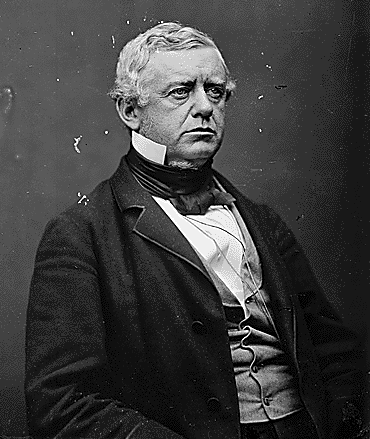
Samuel Hooper

In 1866 Wightman ran for the 40th United States Congress as the Democratic Party candidate for the Massachusetts' fourth Congressional district. Wightman ran as a friend of the working man and the working men were urged to vote for Wightman. However, in the election the vote of the working men went to the Republican candidate Samuel Hooper. Wightman received 3,183 votes against Republican candidate Hooper, who won with 7,902 votes.

== Other positions held ==
Wightman was involved for many years in the civic affairs of the Commonwealth of Massachusetts and the City of Boston, serving in elected and unelected public and private offices.

Wightman was, in 1851, a member of the Massachusetts Great and General Court (Legislature) representing Boston in the Massachusetts state House of Representatives. While a member of the House of Representative, Wightman served on the Joint Standing Committee on Manufactures

In April 1856 Wightman became a member of the Board of Aldermen for the City of Boston. Wightman served as a member of the Board of Aldermen for three years serving as Chairman of the Board of Aldermen in 1858.

From 1858 until 1862 (when he resigned upon assuming the duties of Mayor) Wightman served as an appointed trustee of the city owned Mt Hope Cemetery.

In 1860 Wightman was a delegate to the Fourth National Quarantine and Sanitary Convention held from June 14 to June 16 at Mechanics' Hall, Boston. The last of a series of meetings held to promote sanitary science. During the convention Wightman served as a member of the "Business Committee" Wightman was also on two committees for 1860–1861 for "Arrangements for the Ensuing Year", and on the "Permanent Organization of the Association". (However, as a result of the outbreak of the American Civil War the convention never assembled again.)

On February 13, 1868, Wightman was elected by the Boston City Council to serve a two-year term as a Commissioner of the Cochituate Water Board. At the Water Board's April 6, 1868, organizational meeting Withgman was appointed to the Standing Committee of the Water Registrar's Department and to the Special Auditing Committee. At the April 6, 1869, organizational meeting of the Cochituate Water Board Wightman was put on the Committee of Rules and Regulations, the Standing Committees of the Water Registrar's Department and the Western Division and the Special Committees of High Service, The East Boston Reservoir and, Construction of Telegraph.

Wightman served as Chairman of the three member board of Registrars of Voters from 1878 until his death on January 25, 1885.

== Later years ==
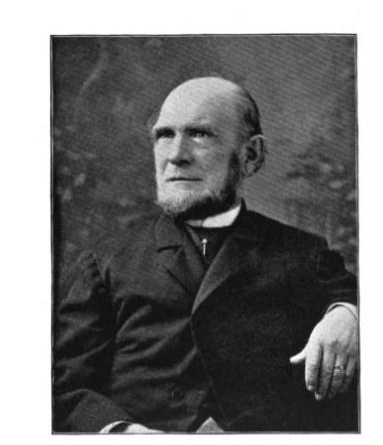
Joseph Wightman later in his life

In his later years Wightman suffered legal trouble. In 1874 he was imprisoned for debt. In a letter to The Boston Journal dated August 12, 1874, Wightman explained that these were debts that he did not himself incur. Wightman explained in his letter that in 1864 he became a stock holder in the Franklin Coal Company. Wightman wrote that in June 1865 against his wishes or knowledge he was made a director of that company. In 1866 the company became insolvent, Wightman was arrested and imprisoned and forced to pay that part of the company's debt (judgment and costs amounting to $14,866.50) owed to Eby, Byres & Co.

== Admission as an attorney ==
In January 1875 Wightman was admitted to the Massachusetts Bar.

== Death and burial ==
Wightman died on January 25, 1885, and was interred in Mount Auburn Cemetery in Cambridge, Massachusetts. His wife Berthia (Bertha) (Morse) died in 1901 and was interred next to him.

=== Books ===
- Select Experiments in Natural Philosophy ... Published by Joseph M. Wightman, (1853).
- Annals of the Boston Primary School Committee: From Its First Establishment in 1818, to Its Dissolution in 1855 Published by G. C. Rand & Avery, city printers, (1860).

== See also ==
- Timeline of Boston, 1850s-1860s

== Bibliography ==
- A Catalogue of the City Councils of Boston, 1822–1908, Roxbury, 1846–1867, Charlestown 1847–1873 and of The Selectmen of Boston, 1634–1822 also of Various Other Town and Municipal officers, Boston, MA: City of Boston Printing Department, (1909) pp. 44, 53, 88, 301, 374–375, 400.
- Adams, George.: The Boston Directory for the Year 1852: Embracing the City Record, a General Directory of the Citizens, and a Business Directory, with an Almanac from July, 1852, to July, 1853, No. 91 Washington Street, Boston, MA: George Adams, (1852) p. 272.
- Annals of the Massachusetts Charitable Mechanic Association, 1795–1892 Printed by Order of the Association, Boston, Massachusetts: Press of Rockwell and Churchill, (1892) pp. 233, 292, 423–425.
- BOSTON.; The City and Its New Mayor—The Past Mayors of Boston and Who They Were—Distress in the City—Personal, New York, NY: New York Times, (January 5, 1868), p. 3.
- Capen, Nahum.: The Massachusetts State Record and Year Book of General Information: 1851 Vol. 5, Boston, Massachusetts: J. French, (1851) pp. 12, 17.
- Channing, William Francis.: Record of Proceedings Before the U.S. Patent Office: – Application for an Extension of Letters Patent No. 17,355, New York, NY: Kilbourne Tompkins, Book and Commercial Printer, (April 17, 1871) pp. 203–204.
- Cheever et al., David Williams.: (1865), Proceedings at the Dedication of the City Hospital: With the Act of the Legislature, Boston, Massachusetts: J.E. Farwell & Company, Printers to the City, (1865) pp. 7, 50.
- Dall, Caroline Wells Healey.: Daughter of Boston: The Extraordinary Diary of a Nineteenth-century Woman, Boston, MA: Beacon Press, (2006) p. 301. ISBN 0-8070-5034-2, ISBN 978-0-8070-5034-7
- Davis, Daniel.: Davis's Manual of Magnetism: Including Also Electro-magnetism, Magneto-Electricity, and Thermo-Electricity. With a Description of the Electrotype Process., Boston, Massachusetts: Daniel Davis, Jr., (1842) pp. 6–8.
- Fitzgerald, Desmond.: History of the Boston Water Works, from 1868 to 1876: Being a Supplement to A "History of The Introduction of Pure Water into the City of Boston, With a Description of its Cochituate Water Works, Etc., 1868.", No. 39 Arch Street. Boston, MA: Office of the Boston Water Board, Rockwell and Churchill, City Printers, (1876) pp. 5, 7.
- Hesseltine, William Best.: Civil War Prisons, Kent, Ohio: Kent State University Press, (1972) pp. 32–34, 37. ISBN 0-87338-129-7
- Higginson, Thomas Wentworth.: Cheerful Yesterdays, Cambridge, MA: The Riverside Press, (1898) pp. 244–245
- Hurt, Raymond.: The History of Cardiothoracic Surgery from Early Times, New York, NY: Informa Health Care, (1996) p. 18. ISBN 1-85070-681-6
- Journal of the Association of Engineering Societies, New York, NY: Published by Board of Managers of the Association of Engineering Societies Vol. V. November 1885 to October 1886, (1886) p. 522.
- Long, Huey B.: Early Innovators in Adult Education, New York, NY: Routledge, (1991) pp. 60–61. ISBN 0-415-00557-4
- Mayors of Boston: An Illustrated Epitome of who the Mayors Have Been and What they Have Done, Boston, MA: State Street Trust Company, (1914) pp. 2, 23, 26.
- McPhetres, Samuel A.: A Political Manual for the Campaign of 1868: For Use in the New England States, Containing the Population and Latest Election Returns of Every Town in New England, and of Every State in the Union, Party Platforms, and Other Valuable Information, Boston, Massachusetts: A. Williams and company, (1868) p. 48.
- Municipal Register containing the City Charter the Rules and Orders of the City Council and a List of Officers for the City of Boston, For the Year 1882., Boston, Massachusetts: Rockwell and Churchill, city printers, (1882) pp. 323–325, 352.
- Official Congressional Directory, Washington, D.C.: United States Congress, (1868) p. 17.
- Proceedings and debates of the fourth National Quarantine and Sanitary Held in the City of Boston, June 14, 15 and 16, 1860. Reported for the City Council of Boston, Boston, Massachusetts: Boston City Council (1860) pp. 2, 6–7, 24, 279.
- Renomination of Mayor Wightman, New York, NY: The New York Times, (November 23, 1862) p. 4.
- Rogers, Fred.: (July 1960), "Before the Storm"—The Fourth National Quarantine and Sanitary Convention, Boston, 1860; Journal of Public Health, Washington, DC: Journal of Public Health (July 1960) Vol. 50 (7), pp. 1032–1033.
- Smith, Goldwin.: Essays on Reform: Essay IX. The Experience of the American Commonwealth, Boston, Massachusetts: Adamant Media Corporation, (2006) pp. 217, 233 ISBN 0-543-91826-2
- Speer, Lonnie R.: Portals to Hell: Military Prisons of the Civil War, Mechanicsburg, PA: Stackpole Books, (1997) p. 44 ISBN 0-8117-0334-7
- Stebbins, L.: First Century of National Existence: The United States as They Were and are, Hartford, Connecticut: Francis Dewing and Co., San Francisco, Cal., (1875) p. 522.
- The City Hall, Boston: Corner Stone Laid, Monday, December 22, 1862. Dedicated Monday, September 17, 1865., Boston, MA: Alfred Mudge & Son, Printers to the City, (1866), pp. 3, 94.
- Vrabel, Jim.: When in Boston: A Time Line & Almanac, Boston, MA: University Press of New England (UPNE), (2004) pp. 173–175. ISBN 1-55553-621-2, ISBN 978-1-55553-621-3
- Ware, Edith Ellen.: Political Opinion in Massachusetts During Civil War and Reconstruction, New York, NY: Columbia University, (1916) pp. 89–90
- Wightman, Joseph.: Annals of the Boston Primary School Committee: From Its First Establishment in 1818 to its Dissolution in 1855, Boston, Massachusetts: G. C. Rand & Avery, city printers, (1860) pp. 7–8, 229, 259–264, 293–294.
- Wightman, Joseph.: Ex-Mayor Wightman.; Imprisoned for debts he did not owe his own account of the way he was compelled to "Submit to the Circumstances.", New York, NY: The New York Times, p. 2. (August 12, 1874) (Letter to the editor originally sent to and published in The Boston Journal).
- Winsor, Justin.: The Memorial History of Boston By Justin Winsor Volume III, Boston, MA: Ticknor and Company, (1881) pp. 265, 276.
- Wolfe, Richard J.: Tarnished Idol: William Thomas Green Morton and the Introduction of Surgical Anesthesia : a Chronicle of the Ether Controversy, Boston, MA: Norman Publishing, (2006) p. 66 ISBN 0-930405-81-1

Political offices
Preceded by Pelham Bonney	Chairman of the Boston Board of Aldermen; 1858–1859	Succeeded by Silas Peirce
Preceded by Frederic W. Lincoln Jr.	Mayor of Boston; 1860–1862	Succeeded by Frederic W. Lincoln Jr.
