= John A. Keliher =

American politician (1866–1938)

John Austin Keliher
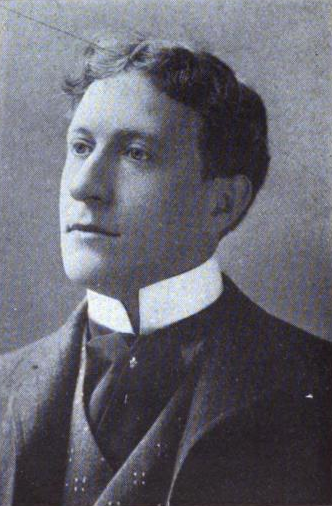
- John A. Keliher circa 1908

Member of the U.S. House of Representatives from Massachusetts's 9th district
- In office March 4, 1903 – March 3, 1911
- Preceded by: Joseph A. Conry
- Succeeded by: William Francis Murray

Member of the Massachusetts House of Representatives

Member of the Massachusetts Senate
- In office 1899–1900

Sheriff of Suffolk County, Massachusetts
- In office May 3, 1917 – September 21, 1938
- Preceded by: John Quinn
- Succeeded by: John F. Dowd

Delegate to the 1917 Massachusetts Constitutional Convention
- In office June 6, 1917 – August 13, 1919

Personal details
- Born: November 6, 1866 Boston
- Died: September 21, 1938 (aged 71) Boston
- Party: Democratic
- Occupation: Real estate

John Austin Keliher (November 6, 1866 – September 21, 1938) was a United States Democratic politician.

He was born in Boston, Massachusetts. He was elected as a Democrat to the United States House of Representatives from Massachusetts and served from March 4, 1903, to March 3, 1911. Congressman Keliher was the uncle of Brigadier-General John J. Keliher and Rear Admiral Thomas Joseph Keliher.

== Defeats in the 1910 congressional election ==
In 1910 Keliher lost his bid for reelection, first losing in the Democratic primary, and in the general election as an independent candidate, losing both times to William F. Murray.

== Sheriff of Suffolk County ==
On April 11, 1917, the incumbent sheriff of Suffolk County, "Honest John" Quinn, died from diabetes. On April 18, 1917 Governor McCall submitted Keliher's name to the Executive Council to fill the vacancy. Keliher's appointment was approved by the Executive Council and he was sworn into office on May 3, 1917. On November 6, 1917 Keliher was elected in his own right and re-elected in every election until 1938.

== 1917 Massachusetts Constitutional Convention ==
In 1916 the Massachusetts legislature and electorate approved the calling of a Constitutional Convention. In May 1917 Keliher was elected to serve as a member of the convention, representing Massachusetts' 11th Congressional District.

== Electoral defeat and death ==
In September 1938 Keliher ran in the primary for renomination as sheriff of Suffolk County. After the returns showed that he was losing the election, he had a heart attack and died in Boston.

== Bibliography ==
- Journal of the Constitutional Convention of the Commonwealth of Massachusetts (1919) pp. 7–8, 865, 971.
- The Municipal Register for 1918 City of Boston (1918) p. 110.
- Who's who in State Politics, 1908 Practical Politics (1908) p. 14.

U.S. House of Representatives
Preceded by Joseph A. Conry	Member of the U.S. House of Representatives from Massachusetts's 9th congressional district March 4, 1903 – March 3, 1911	Succeeded by William Francis Murray
