= Silas Peirce =

American politician

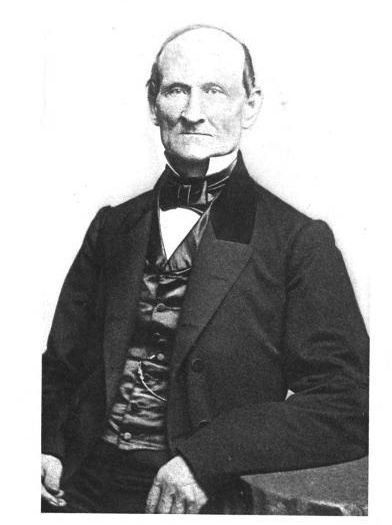

Chairman of the Boston Board of Aldermen
- In office 1861–1862
- Preceded by: Otis Clapp
- Succeeded by: Thomas Phillips Rich
- In office 1859–1860
- Preceded by: Joseph Wightman
- Succeeded by: Otis Clapp

Member of the Boston Board of Aldermen
- In office 1859–1860
- Preceded by: Joseph Wightman
- Succeeded by: Otis Clapp
- In office January 1857 – January, 1862
- In office January, 1863 – January, 1864

Personal details
- Born: February 15, 1793 (United States) Scituate, Massachusetts
- Died: August 27, 1879 (aged 86) (United States) Boston, Massachusetts
- Occupation: Grocer and politician

Silas Peirce (February 15, 1793 – August 27, 1879) was an American grocer and politician who founded the wholesale grocer Silas Peirce & Co, in Boston, Massachusetts. in April, 1815. The grocery firm of Silas Peirce & Co., Ltd. lasted 111 years.

== Political offices ==
Peirce served as chairman and a member of the Boston Board of Aldermen.

== Military service ==
From 1816 to 1822, Peirce served in the First Regiment, Third Brigade, Fourth Division of the Massachusetts Volunteer Militia. In 1821 Peirce joined the Ancient and Honorable Artillery Company of Massachusetts.

== Archives and records ==
- Silas Peirce & Company records at Baker Library Special Collections, Harvard Business School.
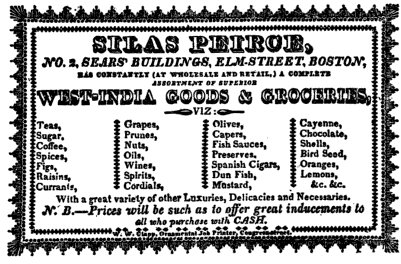
Silas Peirce's Business card circa 1822
- Silas Peirce and Company Records at Archives and Distinctive Collections, College of the Holy Cross.

== See also ==
- List of grocers

Political offices
Preceded by Otis Clapp	Chairman of the Boston Board of Aldermen; 1861–1862	Succeeded by Thomas Phillips Rich
Preceded by Joseph Wightman	Chairman of the Boston Board of Aldermen; 1859–1860	Succeeded by Otis Clapp
