= Boston City Council (1822–1909) =

Bicameral city council in Massachusetts, US

Type
- Type: Bicameral deliberative assembly of the City of Boston (Massachusetts, U.S.)
- Houses: Boston Board of Aldermen (upper chamber); Boston Common Council (lower chamber)

History
- Founded: May 1, 1822
- Disbanded: 1909
- Preceded by: Boston Board of Selectmen
- Succeeded by: Boston City Council (unicameral)
- Seats: Varied over time

Constitution
- Boston City Charter (1822)

The Boston City Council was the bicameral legislative body of Boston, Massachusetts, United States, from 1822 until 1909. Its upper chamber was the Board of Aldermen, whose members were elected at-large, while the lower chamber was the much larger Common Council, whose members were elected from multi-member electoral districts (wards). Prior to 1822, the Boston Board of Selectmen governed the city. The bicameral council lasted until 1909, when it was replaced by the modern Boston City Council. Unlike the bicameral 1822 council, the modern council that was established in 1909 is unicameral.

== Description ==
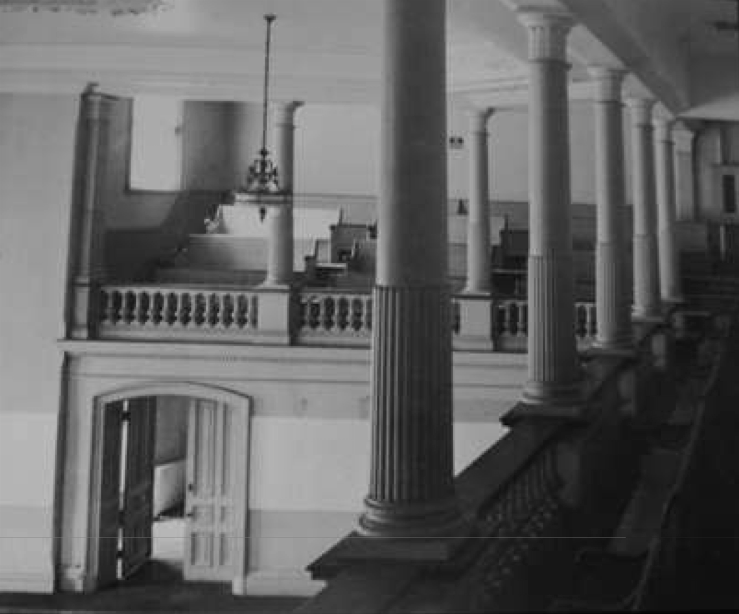
Historic photograph of the council chamber at Old City Hall

Prior to 1822, Boston was governed by the Boston Board of Selectmen. Boston voted in 1822 to incorporate as a city and adopted the Boston City Charter. On May 1, 1822, the Boston Board of Selectmen ceremonially handed over the city to the new government consisting of the newly established City Council and the newly established mayoralty.

Under this original Boston City Charter, between 1822 and 1909, the city's legislative body was bicameral. This legislature, known as the Boston City Council, consisted of a Board of Aldermen that was elected at-large and a much larger Common Council with members that was elected from multi-member wards. This Boston City Council existed along with a mayoralty that was established by the charter.

After the Boston City Charter was rewritten in 1909, the Boston City Council was recreated as a nine-member unicameral body.

== Common Council ==
=== Presidents of the Boston Common Council ===
The Common Council was led by a president. The following table chronologically lists the tenures of individuals in this position:

Presidents of the Boston Common Council (1822–1909)
Name	Tenure
William Prescott Jr.	1822
John Welles	1823
Francis Johonnot Oliver	1824–1825
John Richardson Adan	1826–1828
Elliphalet Williams	1829
Benjamin T. Pickman	1830–1831
John P. Bigelow	1832
Josiah Quincy Jr.	1834–1836
Philip Marett	1837–1840
Edward Blake	1841–1843
Peleg Chandler	1844–1845
George Stillman Hillard	1846–1847
Benjamin Seaver	1847–1849
Francis Brinley	1850–1851
Henry Gardner	1852–1853
Alexander H. Rice	1854
Joseph Story	1855
Oliver Stevens	1856–1857
Samuel Wallace Waldron	1858
Josiah Putnam Bradlee	1859–1860
Joseph Hildreth Bradley	1861
Joshua Dorsey Ball	1862
George Silsbee Hale	1863–1864
William Bentley Fowle Jr.	1865
Joseph Story	1866
Weston Lewis	1867
Charles Hastings Allen	1868
William Giles Harris	1869
Melville E. Ingalls	1870
Matthias Rich	1871
Marquis Fayette Dickinson Jr.	1872
Edward Olcott Shepard	1873–1874
Halsey J. Boardman	1875
John Q. A. Brackett	1876
Benjamin Pope	1877–1878
William Henry Whitmore	1879
Harvey Newton Shepard	1880
Andrew Jackson Bailey	1881
Charles Edward Pratt	1881–1882
James Joseph Flynn	1883
John Henry Lee	1884
Edward John Jenkins	1885–1886
David Franklin Barry	1886–1888
Horace G. Allen	1889–1890
David Frankin Barry	1891
Christopher Francis O'Brien	1894–1895
Joseph A. Conry	1896–1897
Timothy Lawrence Connolly	1898
Daniel Joseph Kiley	1899–1901
Arthur Walter Dolan	1902–1905
William John Barrett	1906–1907
Leo F. McCullough	1908
George C. McCabe	1909

Gallery of Presidents of the Boston Common Council (partial)
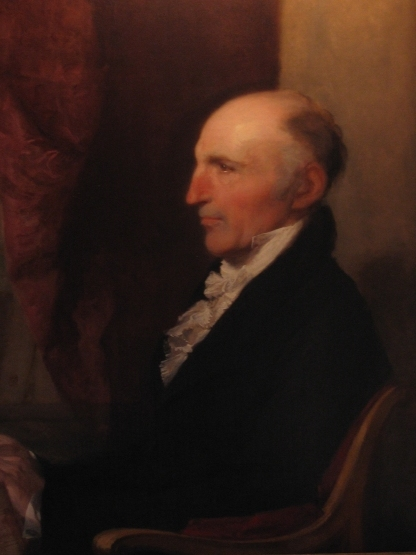
William Prescott Jr.
(1822)

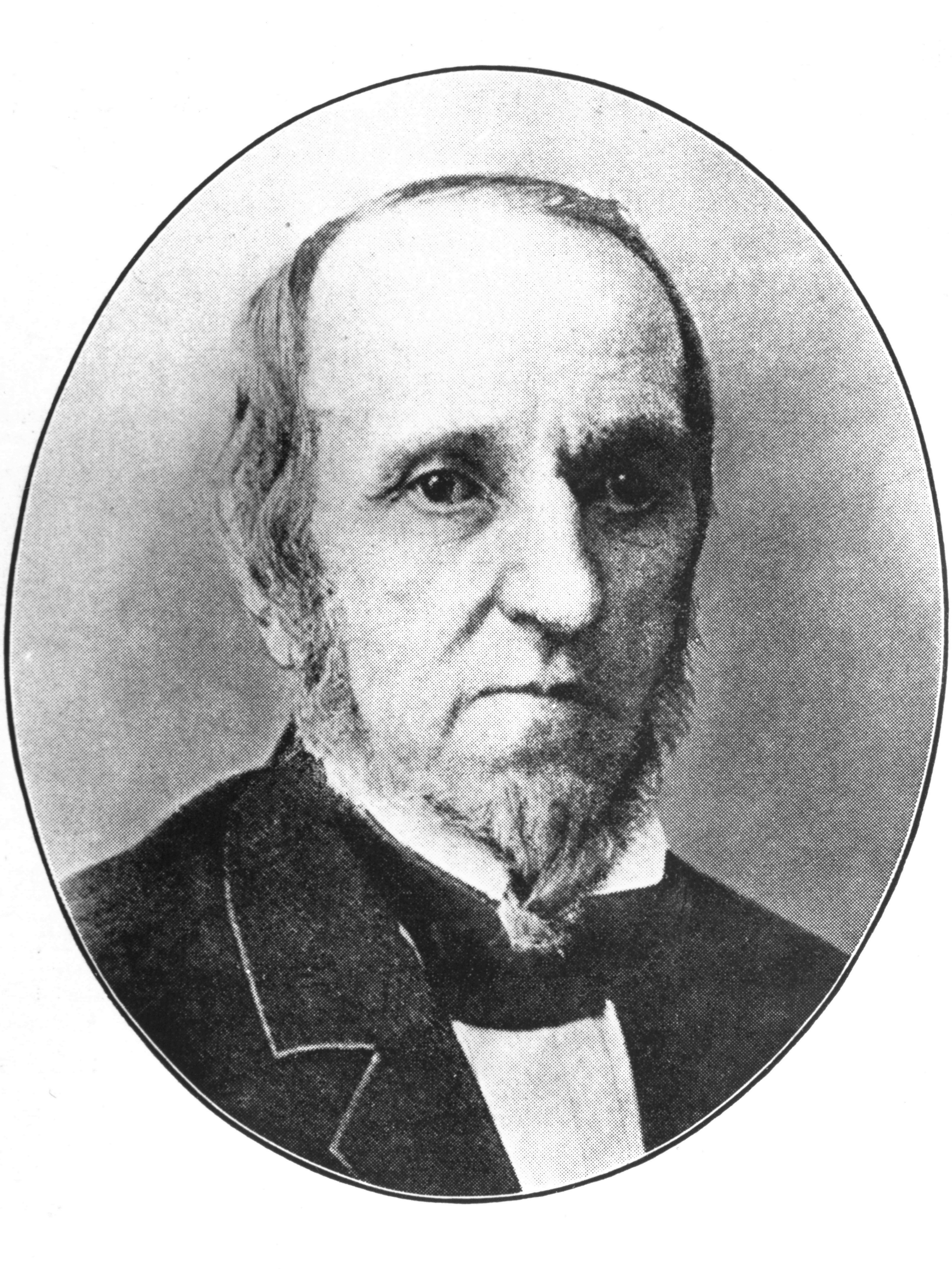
John P. Bigelow
(1832)

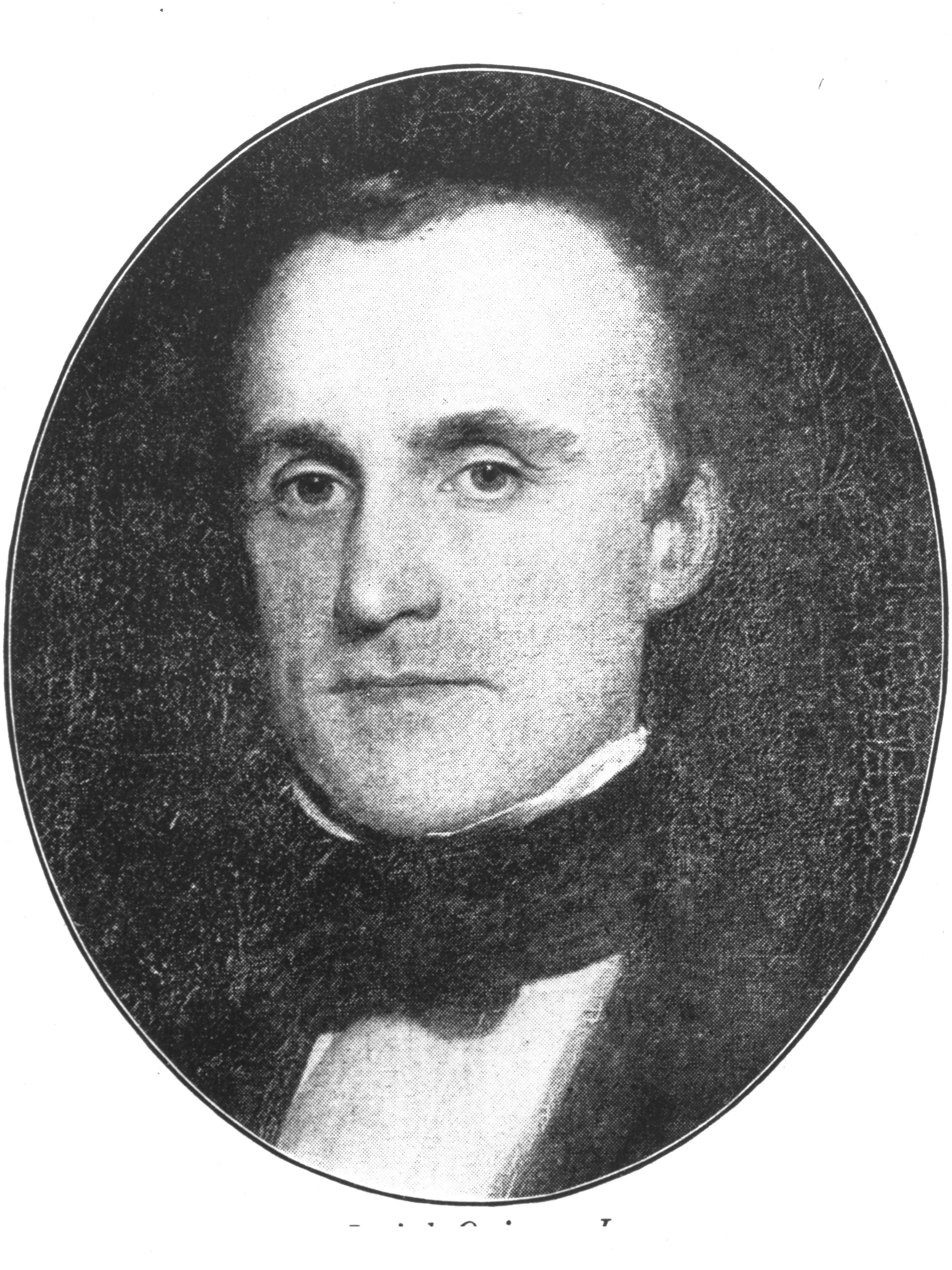
Josiah Quincy Jr.
(1834–1836)

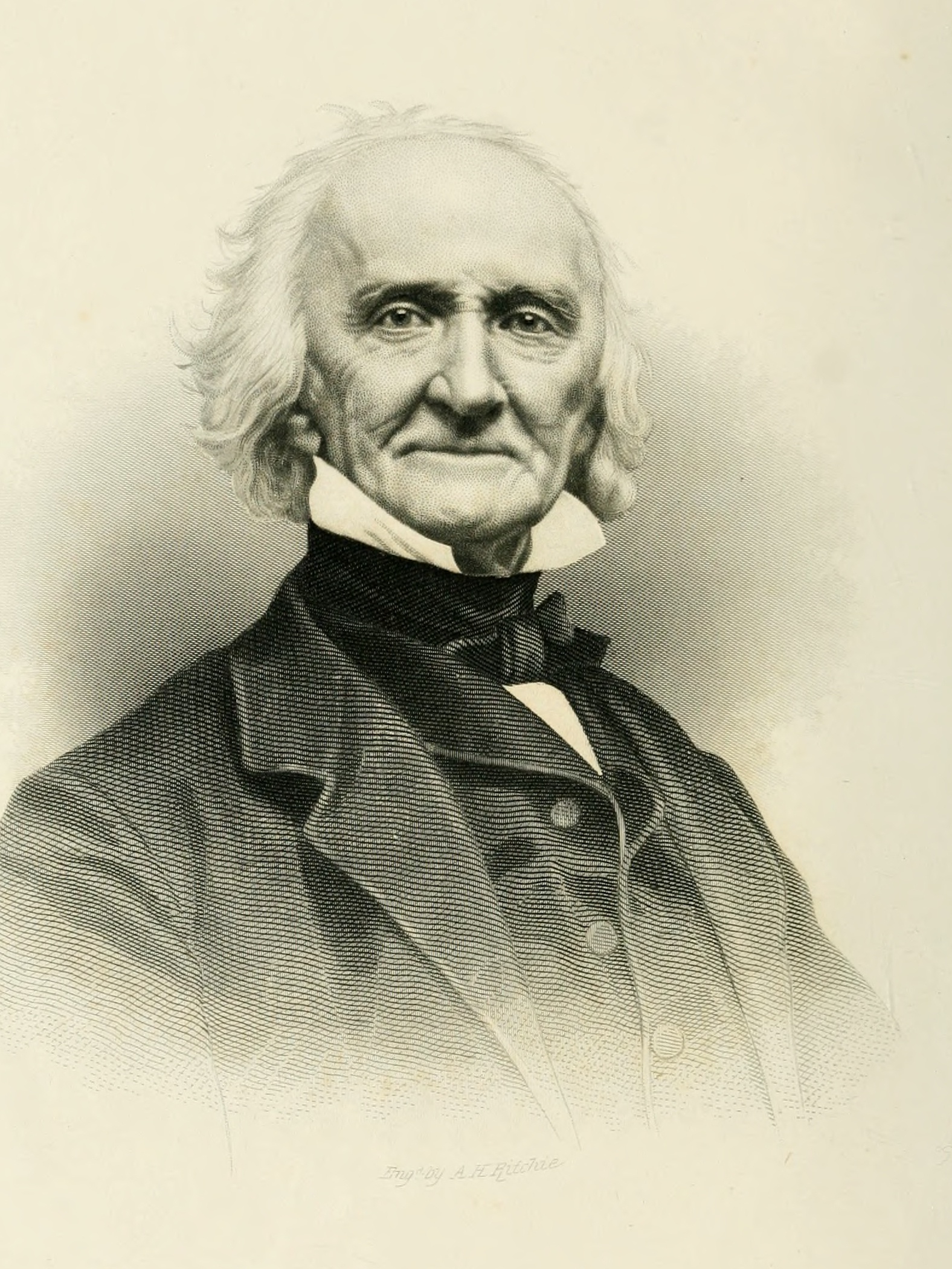
Philip Marett
(1837–1840)

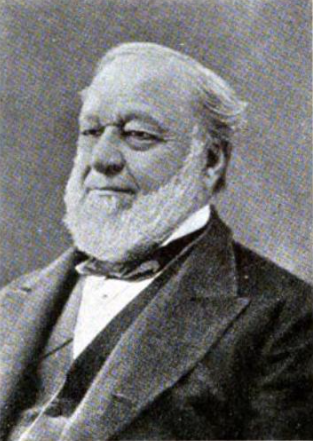
Peleg Chandler
(1844–1845)

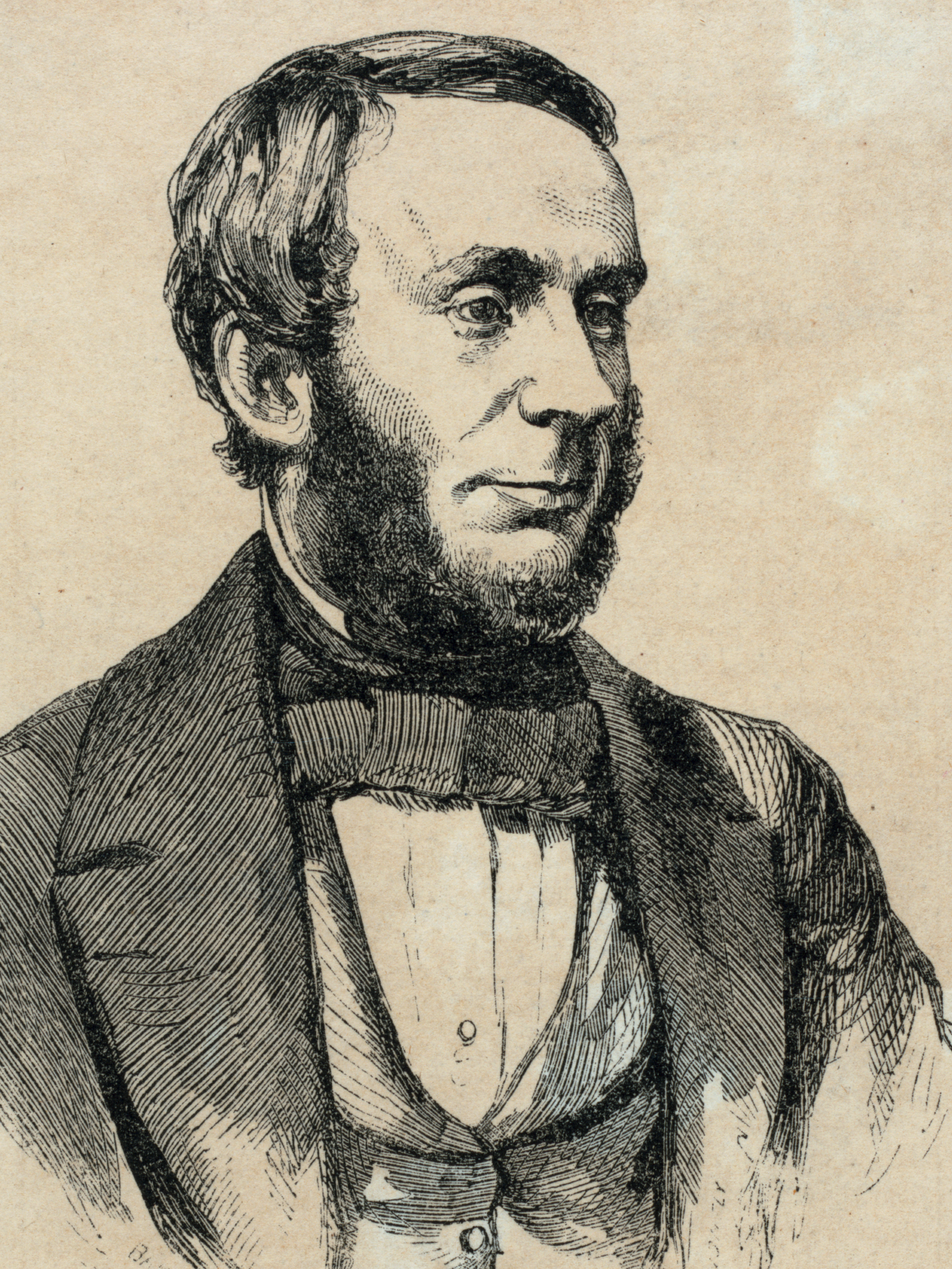
George Stillman Hillard
(1846–1847)

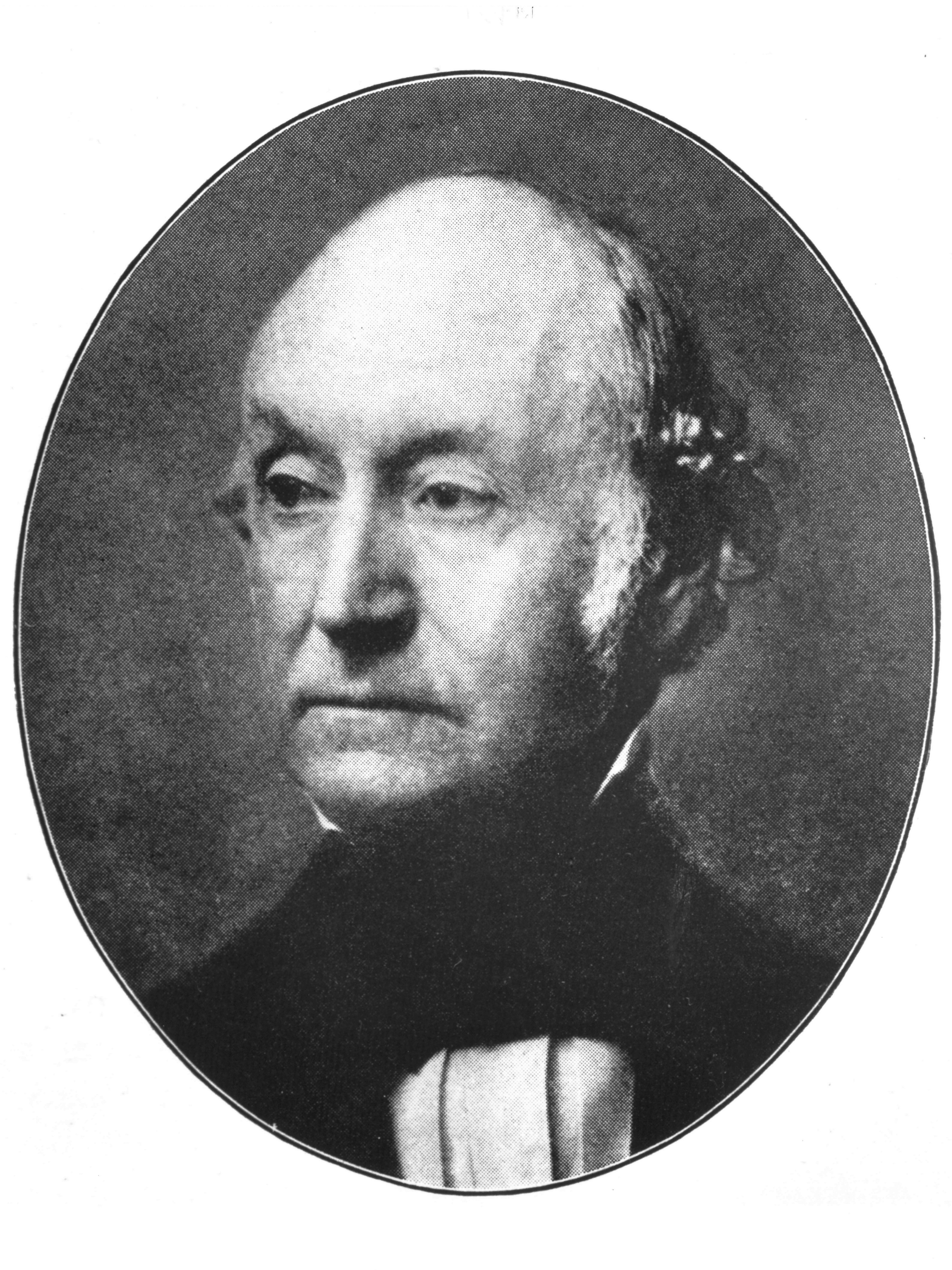
Benjamin Seaver
(1847–1849)

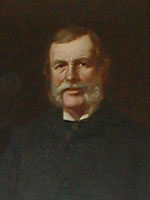
Henry Gardner
(1852–1853)

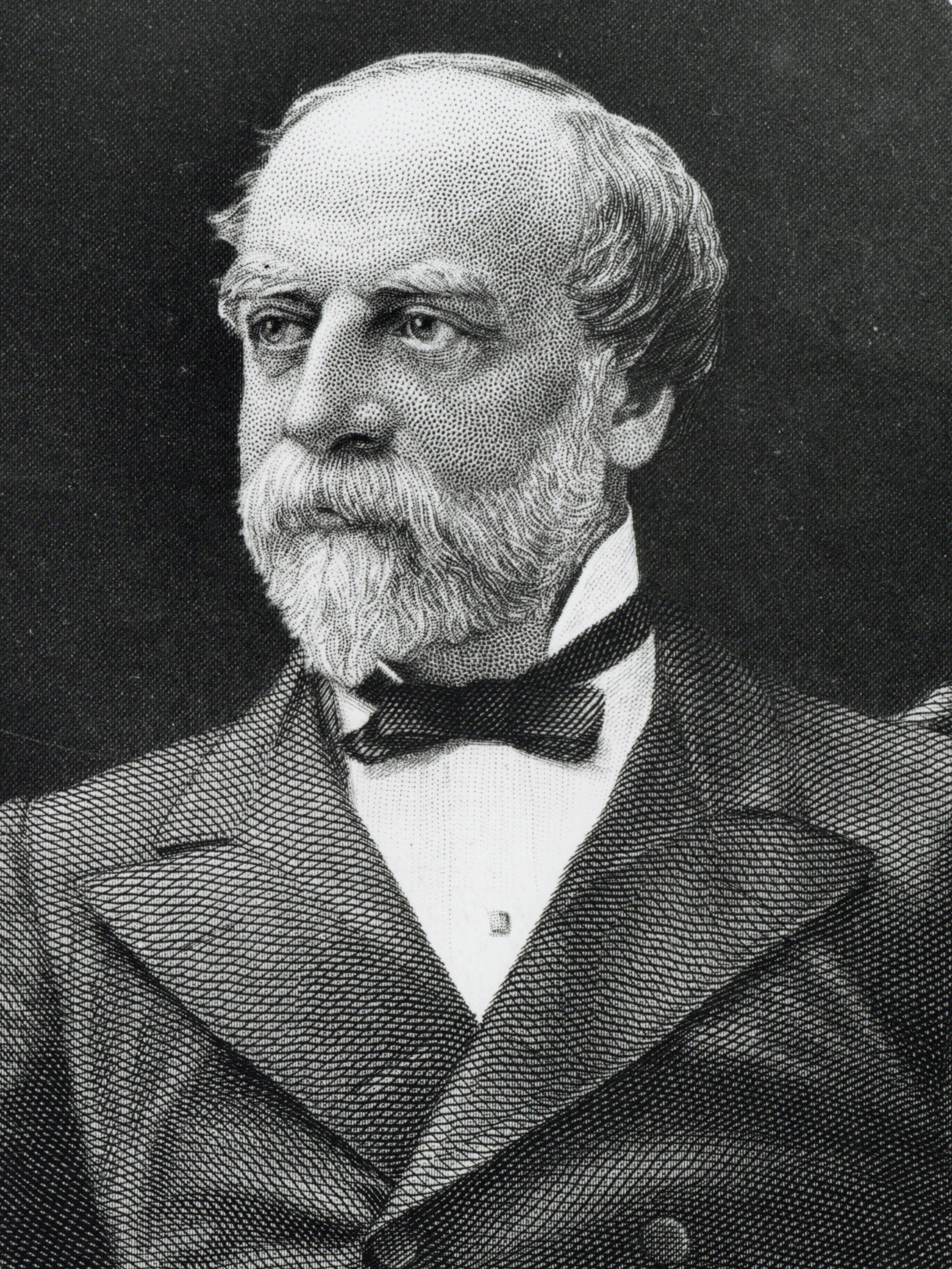
Alexander H. Rice
(1854)

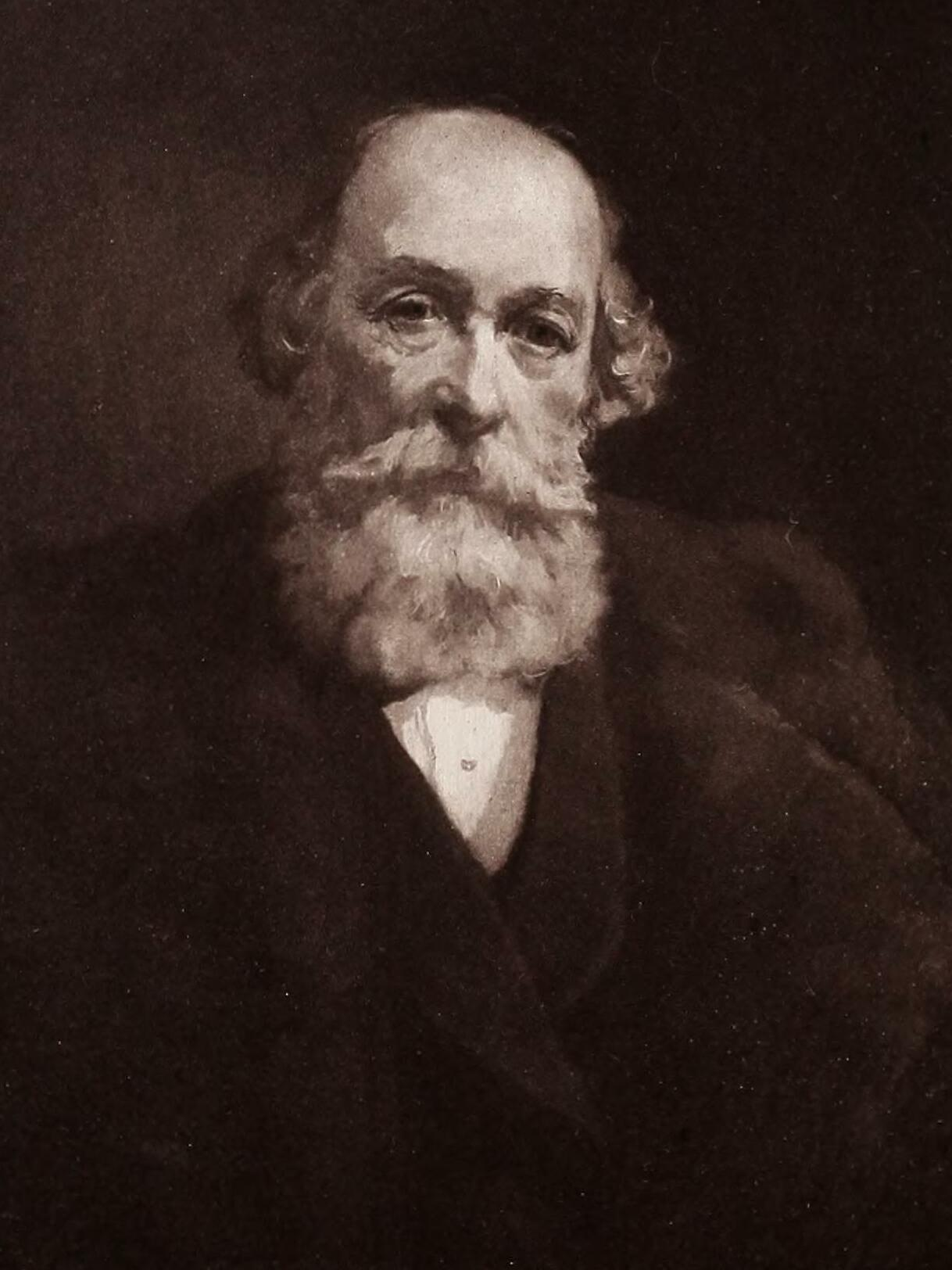
George Silsbee Hale
(1863–1864)

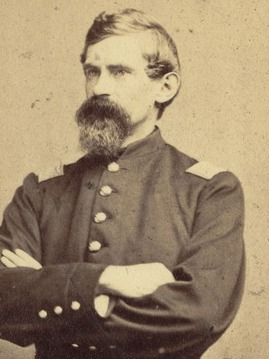
William Bentley Fowle Jr.
(1865)

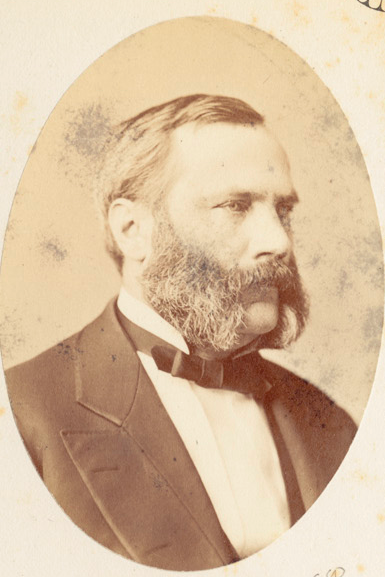
Charles Hastings Allen
(1868)

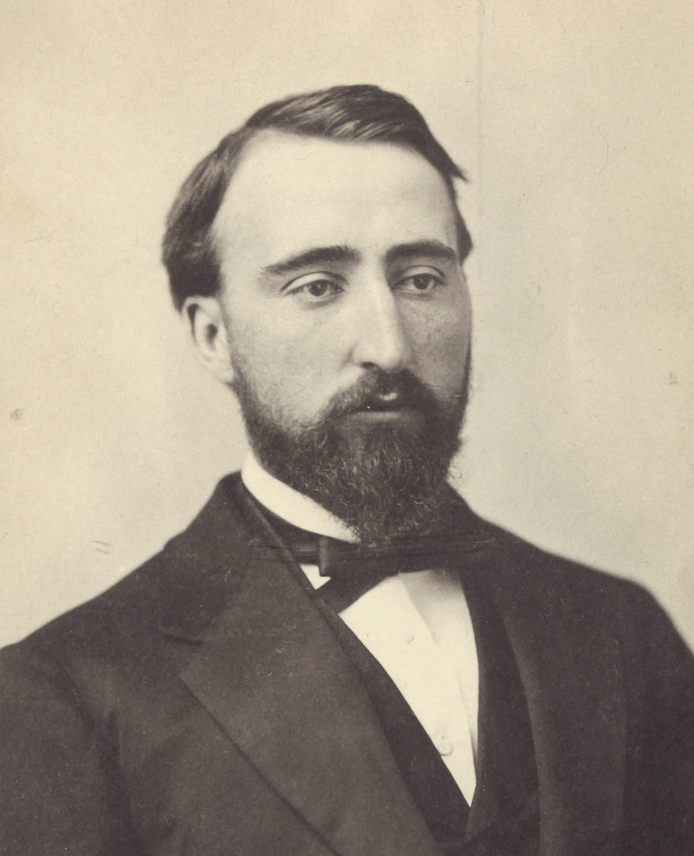
Melville E. Ingalls
(1870)

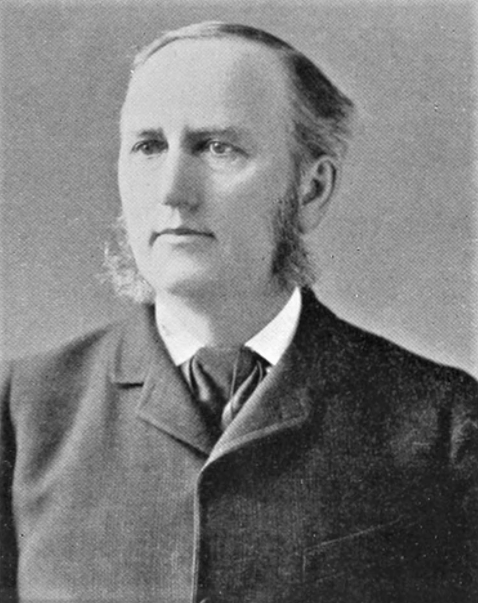
Marquis Fayette Dickinson Jr.
(1872)

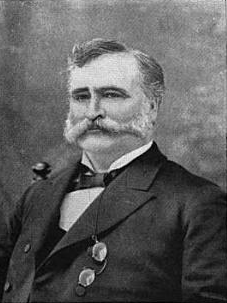
Halsey J. Boardman
(1875)

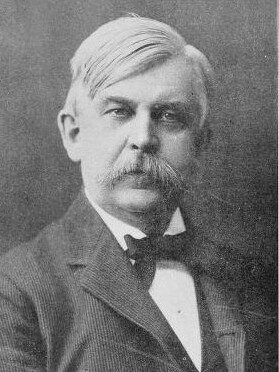
John Q. A. Brackett
(1876)

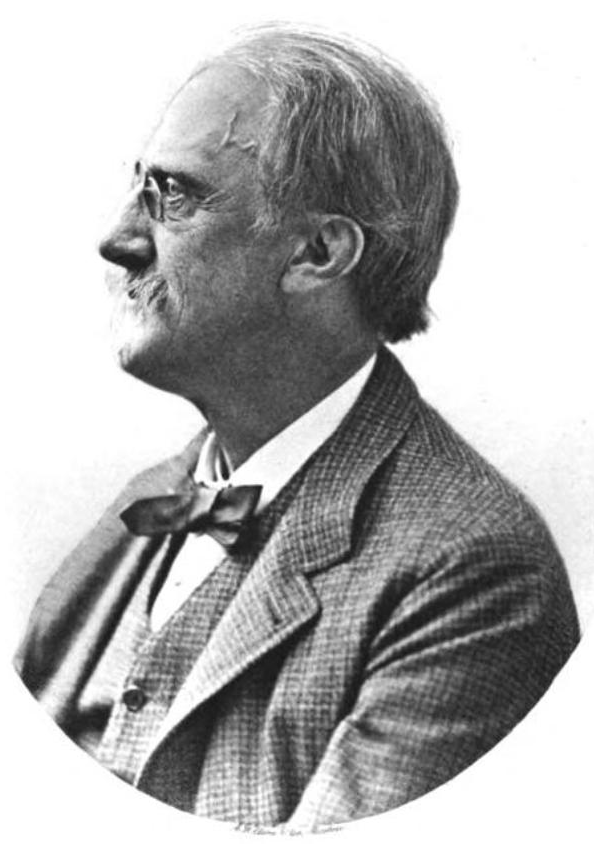
William Henry Whitmore
(1879)

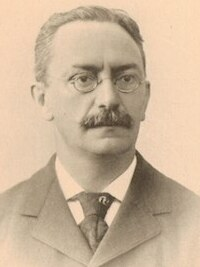
Harvey Newton Shepard
(1880)

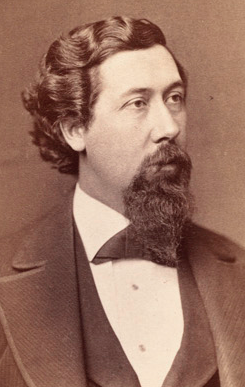
Andrew Jackson Bailey
(1881)

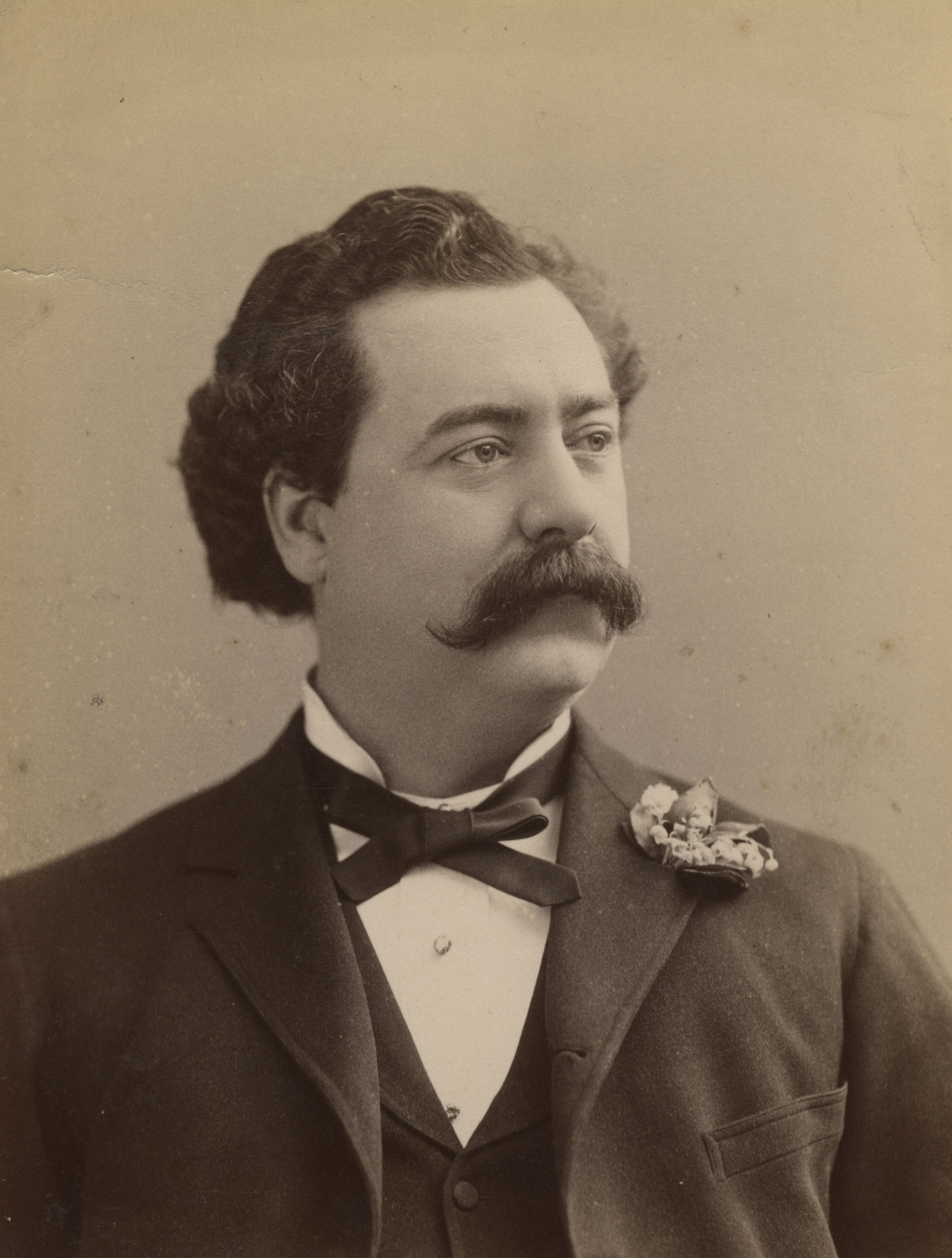
Edward John Jenkins
(1885–1886)

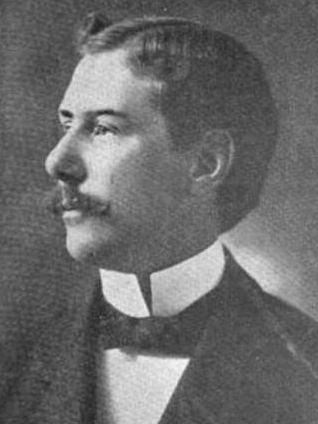
Joseph A. Conry
(1896–1897)

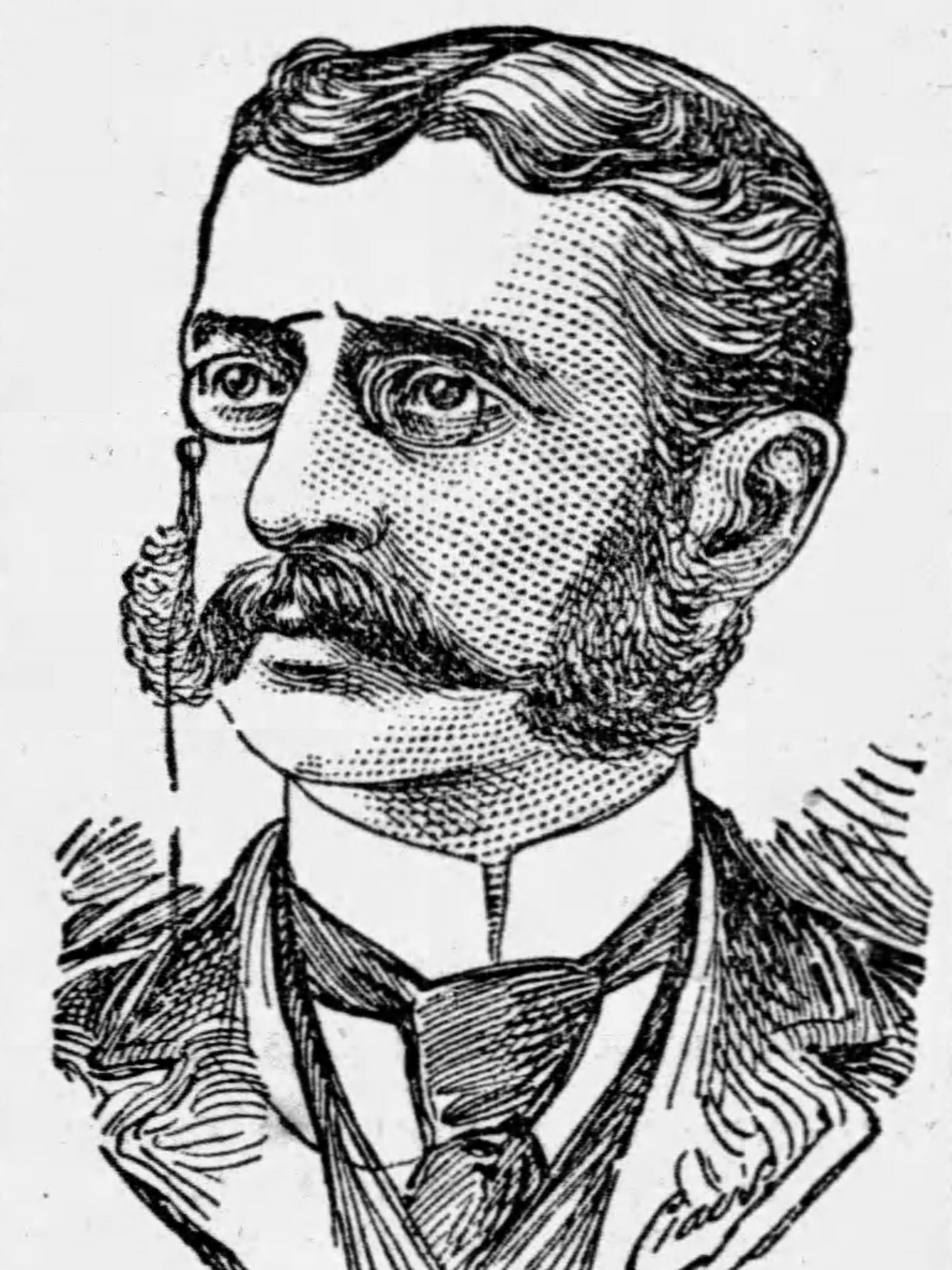
Horace G. Allen
(1889–1890)

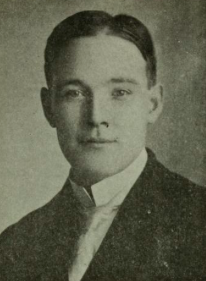
Leo F. McCullough
(1908)

== Board of Aldermen ==
=== Chairmen of the Boston Board of Aldermen ===
The Board of Aldermen was led by a chairman. The following table chronologically lists the tenures of individuals in this role:

Chairmen of the Boston Board of Aldermen
Name	Tenure
Benson Leavitt	
William Washburn	1855
Phelham Bonney	1856–1857
Joseph Wightman	1858
Silas Peirce	1859
Otis Clapp	1860
Silas Peirce	1861
Thomas Phillips Rich	1862
Thomas Coffin Amory	1863
Otis Norcross	1864
George Washington Messinger	1865–1866 (1)
Charles Wesley Slack	1867
George Washington Messinger	1868 (2)
Benjamin James	1869
Newton Talbot	1870
Charles Edward Jenkins	1871
Samuel Little	1872
Leonard R. Cutter	1873
John Taylor Clark	1874–1877
Solomon B. Stebbins	1878 (1)
Hugh O'Brien	1879–1881 (1)
Solomon B. Stebbins	1882 (2)
Hugh O'Brien	1883 (2)
Charles Varney Whitten	1884–1885
Charles Hastings Allen	1886 (1)
Patrick John Donovan	1887
Charles Hastings Allen	1888 (2)
Homer Rogers	1889
William Power Wilson	1890
Herbert Shaw Carruth	1891
John Henry Lee	1892–1893 (1)
Alpheus Sanford	1894–1895
John Henry Lee	1896 (2)
Perlie Appleton Dyar	1897–1898
Joseph A. Conry	1898
David Franklin Barry	1899
Michael Joseph O'Brien	1900
James Henry Doyle	1901–1904
Daniel A. Whelton	1905
Charles Martin Draper	1906
Edward L. Cauley	1906
William Berwin	1907
Louis M. Clark	1908
James Michael Curley (acting chairman)	1909
Frederick J. Brand	1909

Gallery of Chairmen of the Boston Board of Aldermen (partial)
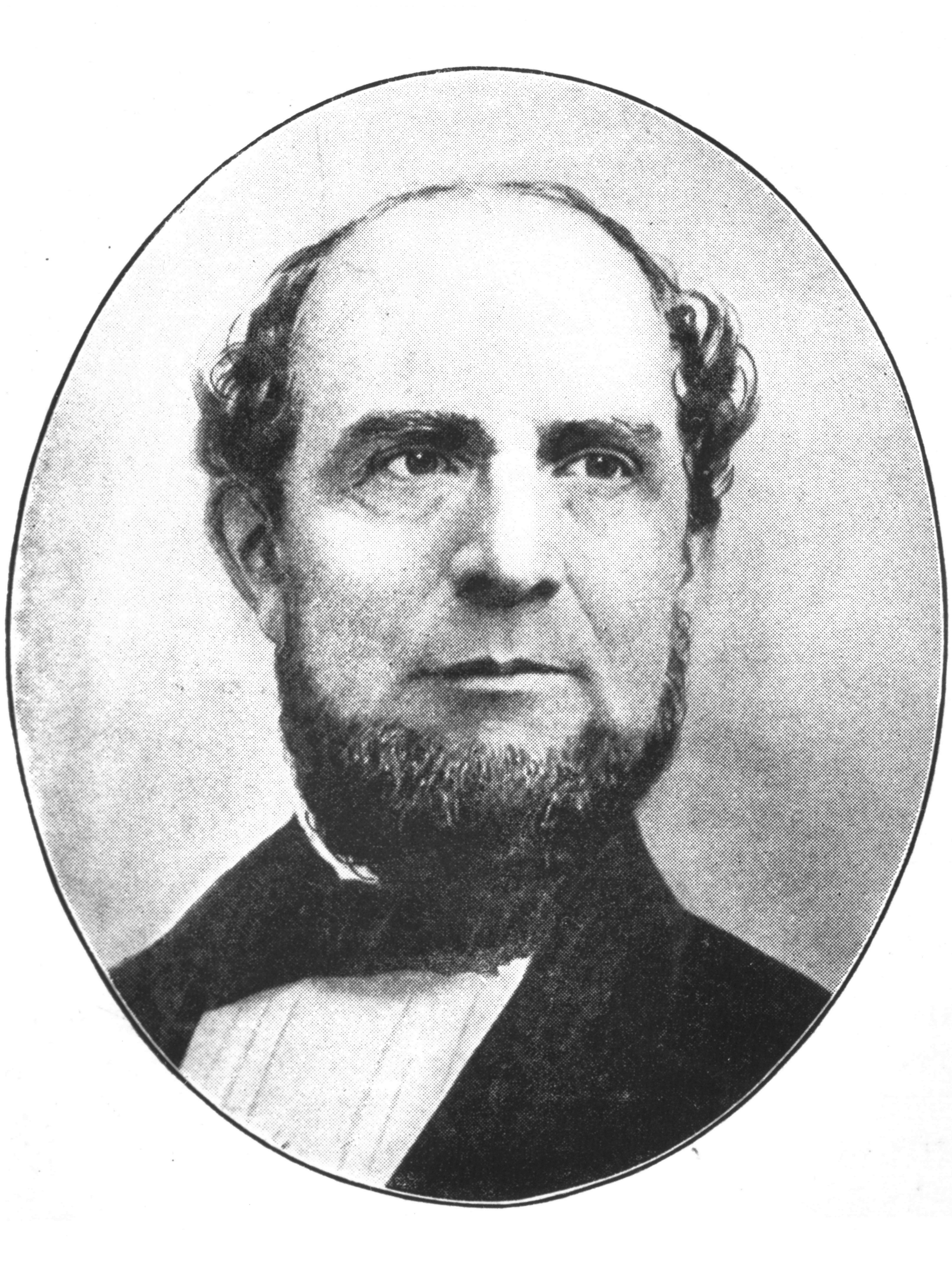
Joseph Wightman
(1858)

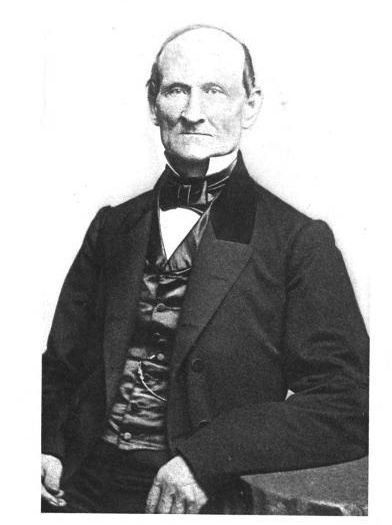
Silas Peirce
(1859, 1861)

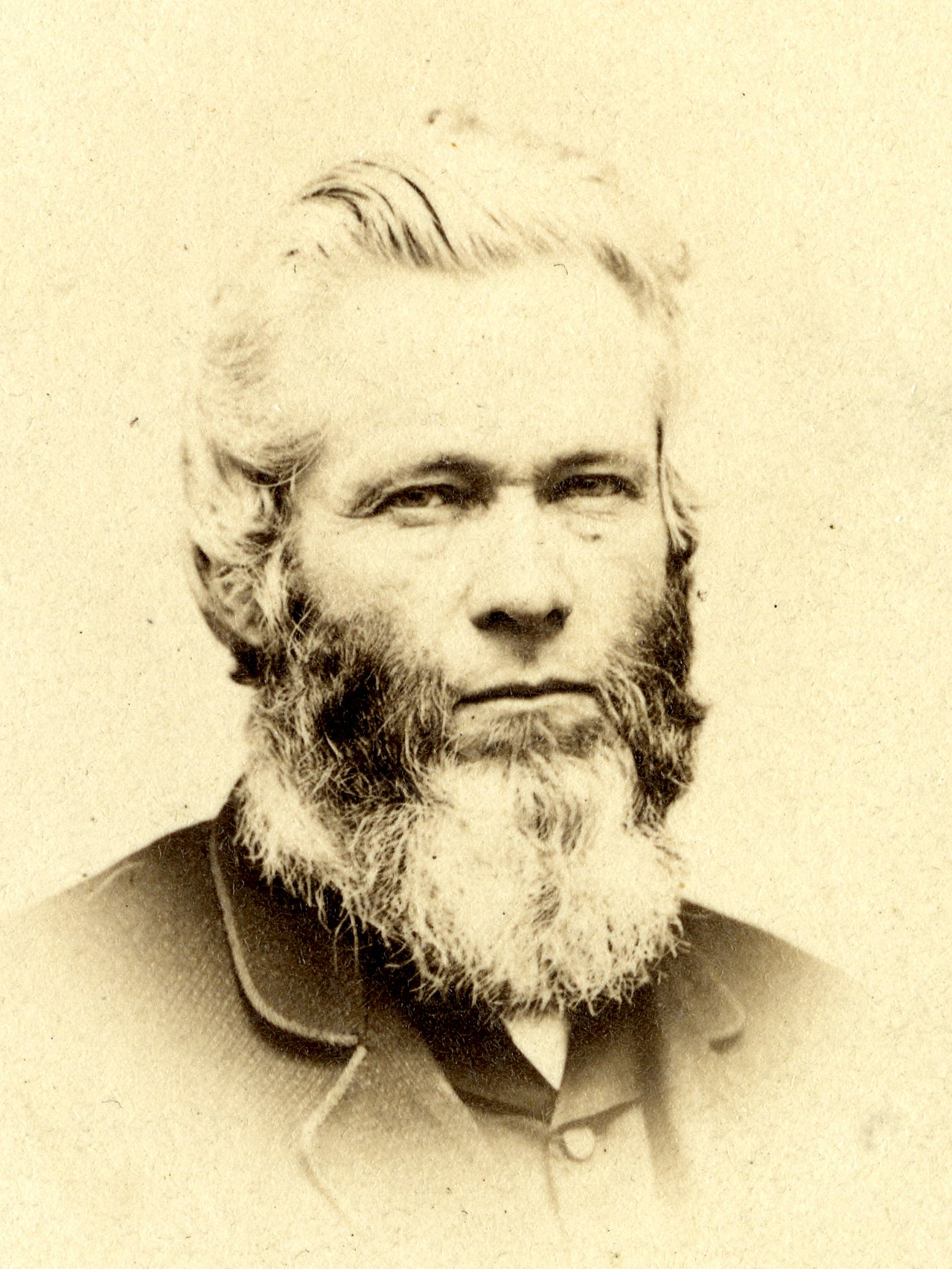
Otis Clapp
(1860)

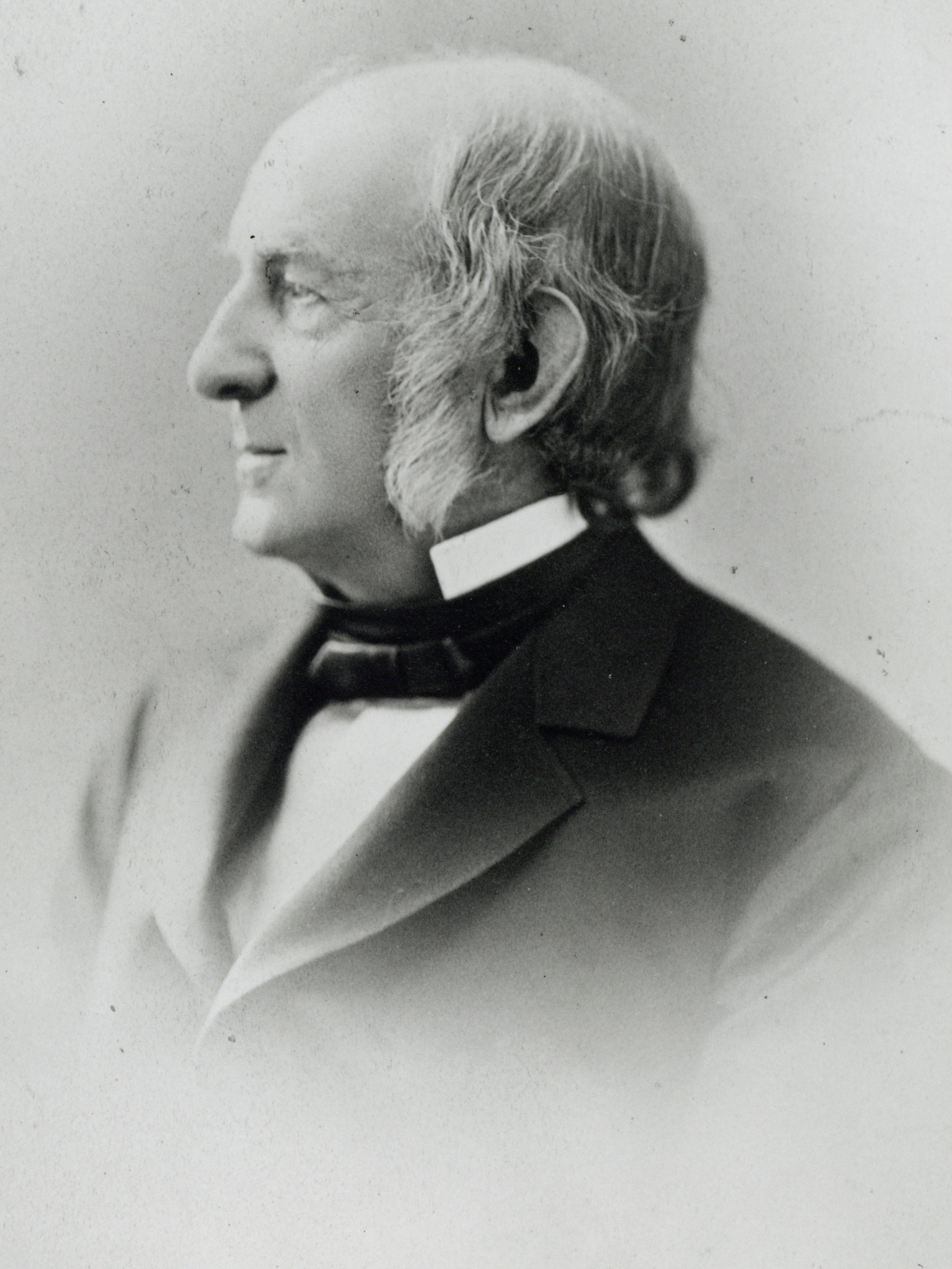
Otis Norcross
(1864)

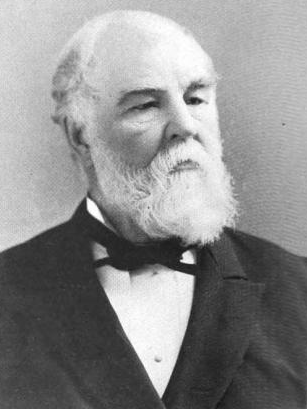
Newton Talbot
(1870)

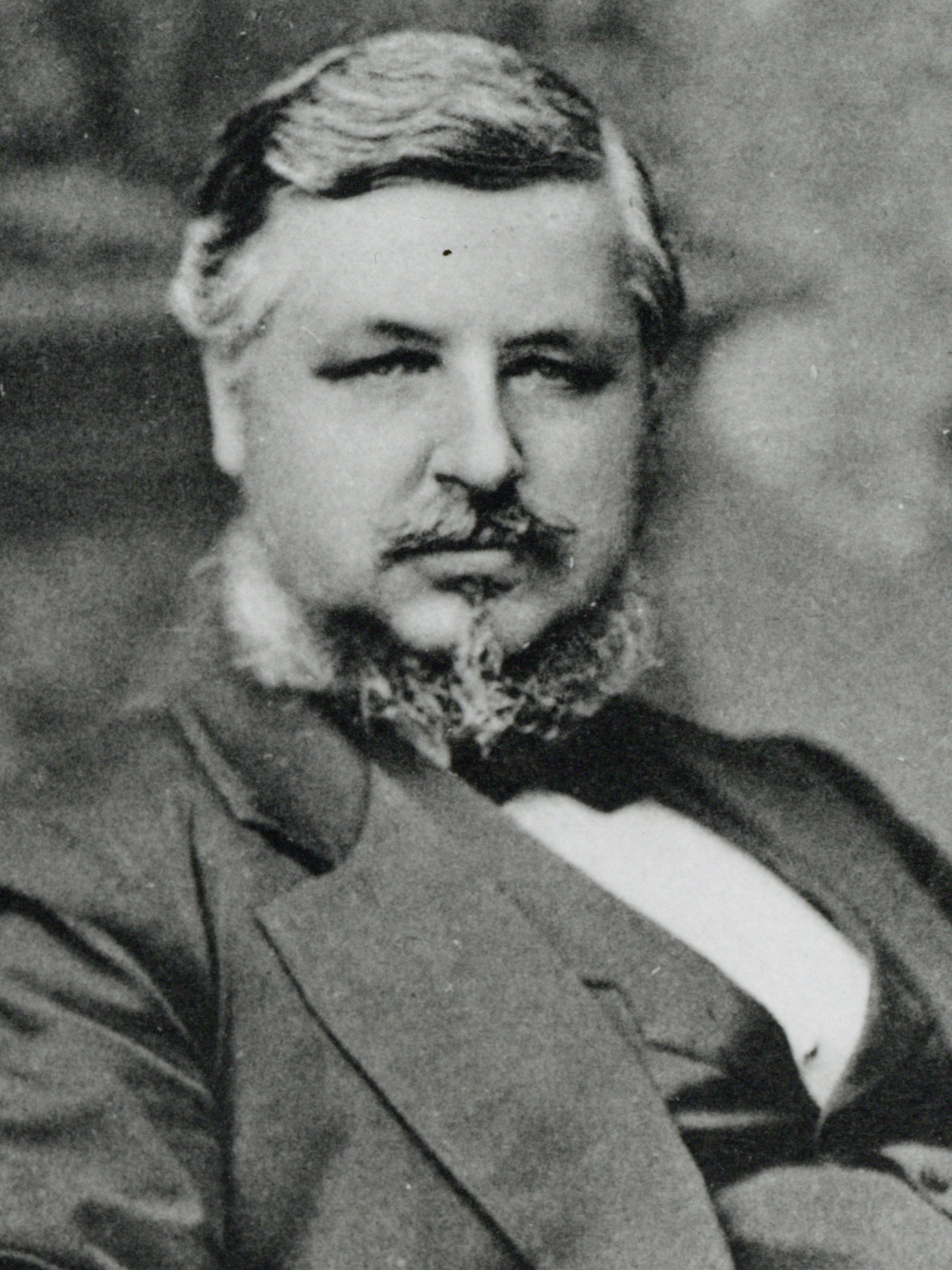
Leonard R. Cutter
(1873)

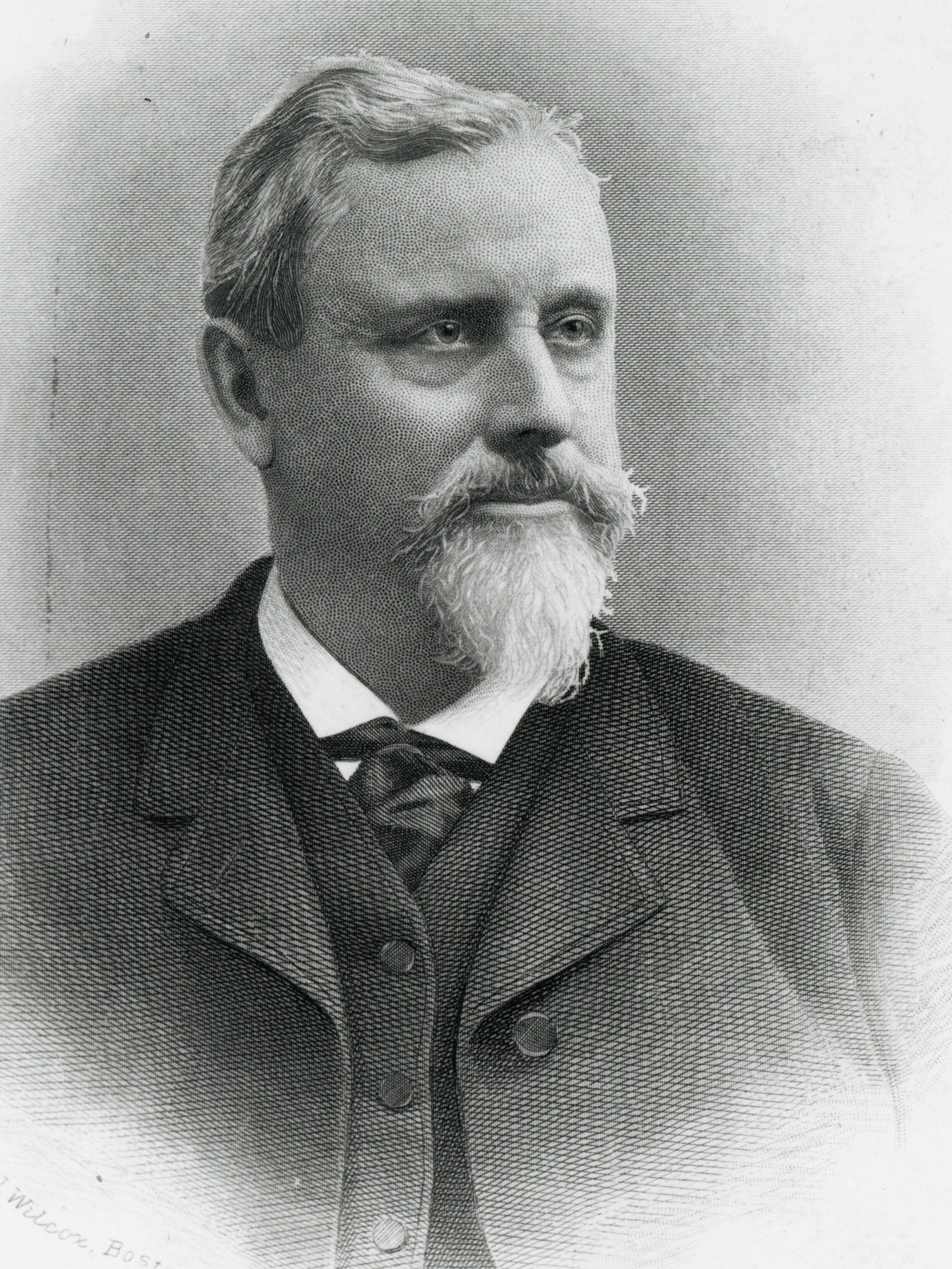
Hugh O'Brien
(1879–1881, 1883)

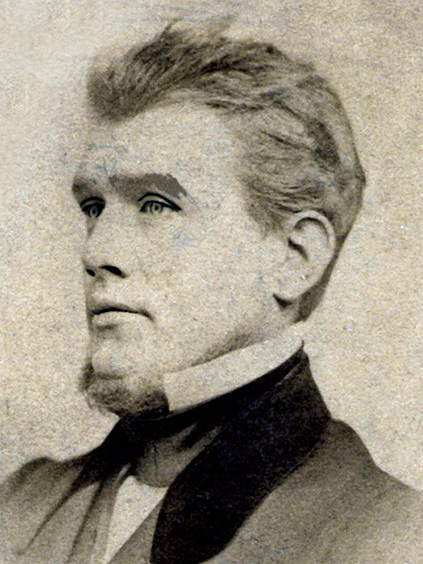
Solomon B. Stebbins
(1878, 1882)

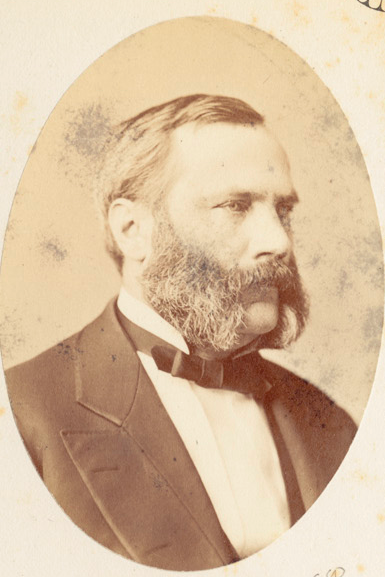
Charles Hastings Allen
(1886, 1888)

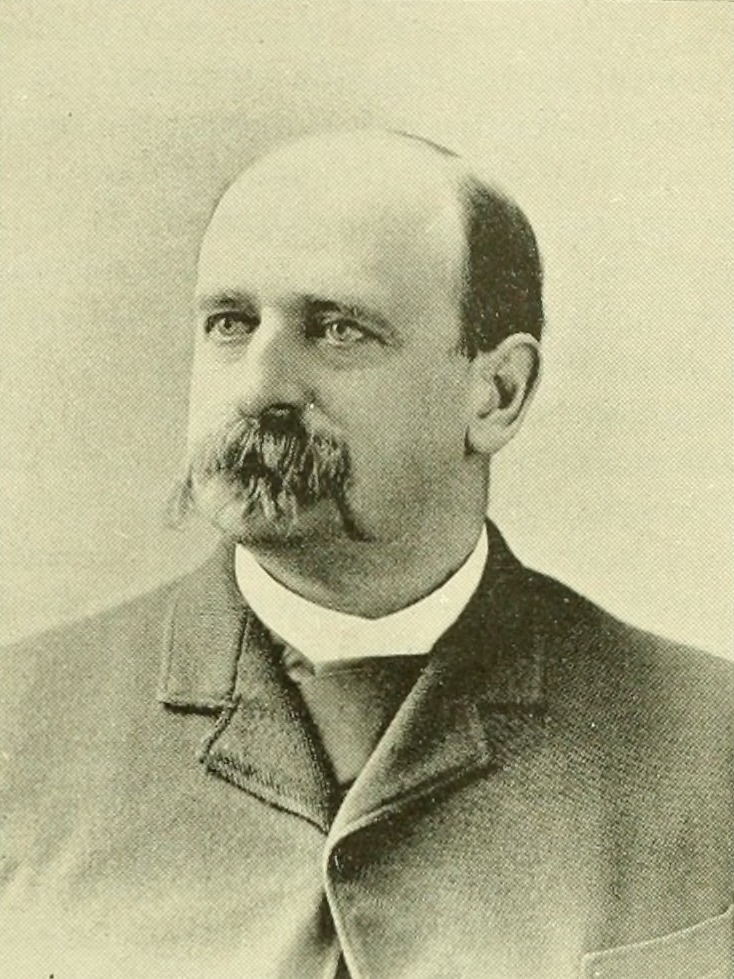
Homer Rogers
(1889)

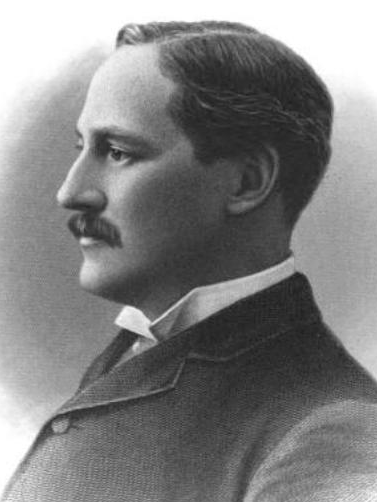
William Power Wilson
(1890)

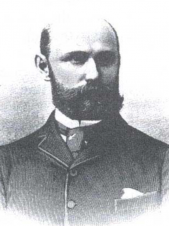
Herbert Shaw Carruth
(1891)

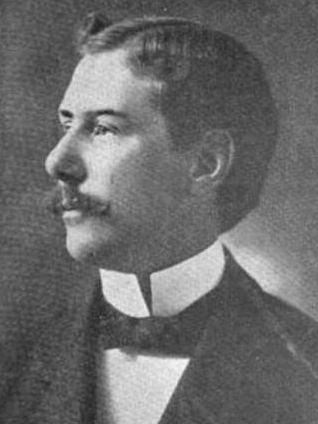
Joseph A. Conry
(1898)

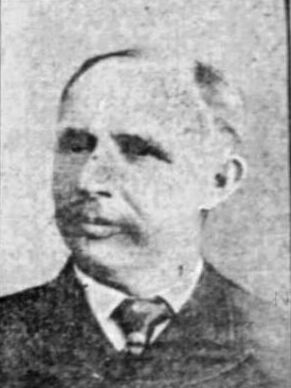
Michael Joseph O'Brien
(1900)

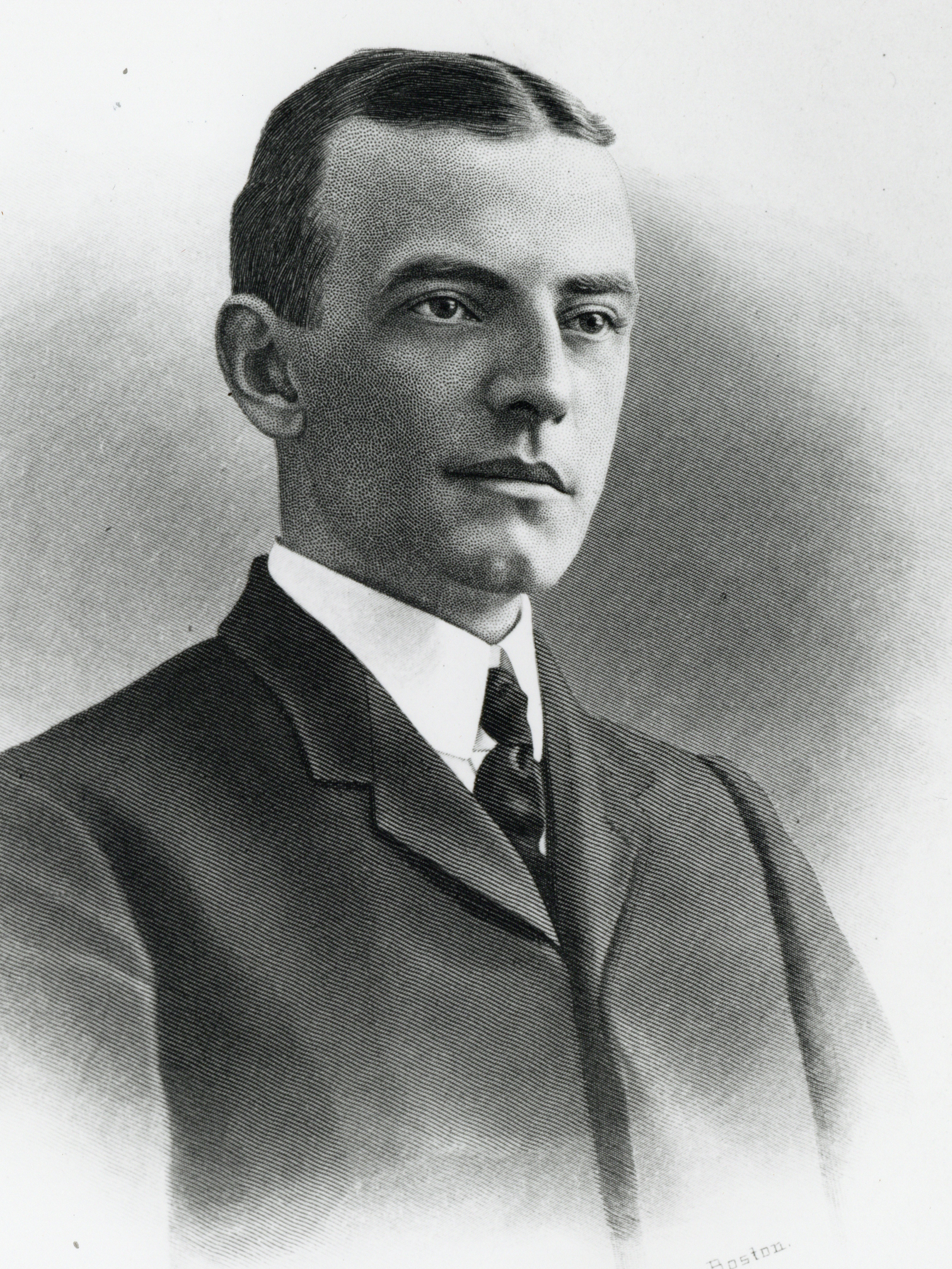
Daniel A. Whelton
(1905)

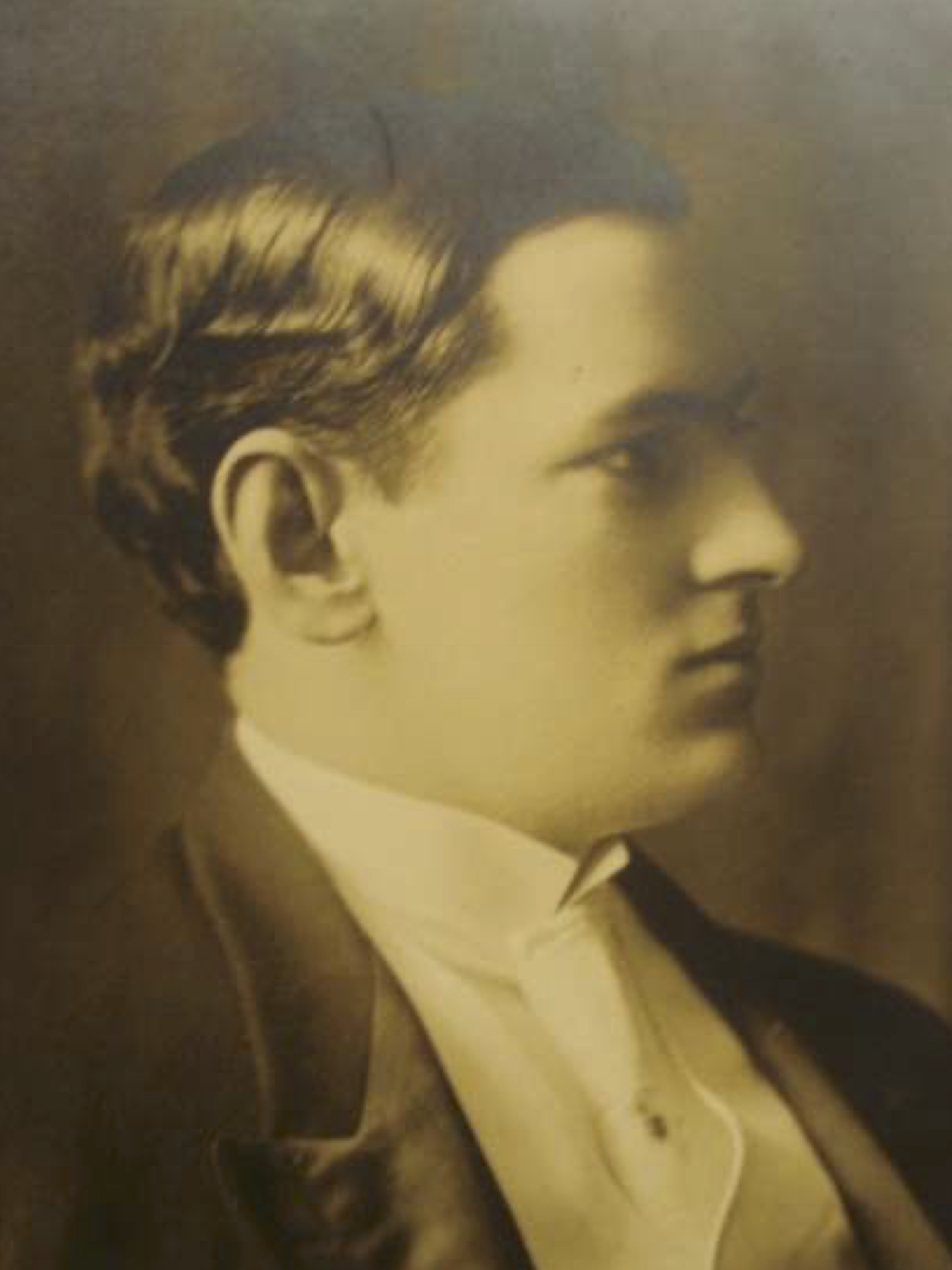
James Michael Curley
(acting chairman in 1909)

== See also ==
- List of members of the Boston City Council
