= John R. Murphy =

American politician (1856–1932)

- portrait photograph, circa 1921

Commissioner of the Boston Fire Department

Member of the Massachusetts House of Representatives
- In office 1919–1921
- Preceded by: John Grady
- Succeeded by: Theodore A. Glynn

Chairman of the Boston Finance Commission
- In office February 25, 1914 – February 15, 1919

Member of the Massachusetts Senate Second Suffolk District
- In office 1886

Member of the Massachusetts House of Representatives Fifth Suffolk District
- In office 1883–1885

Personal details
- Born: August 25, 1856 Boston, Massachusetts, U.S.
- Died: December 28, 1932 (aged 76) Boston, Massachusetts, U.S.
- Party: Democratic
- Spouse: Mary Daly (m.1893)
- Children: 4
- Occupation: Attorney

John Robert Murphy (August 25, 1856 – December 28, 1932) was a Massachusetts politician and attorney who served as the Commissioner of the Boston Fire Department, Chairman of the Boston Finance Commission and in both branches of the Massachusetts legislature.

== Early life ==
Murphy was born in Charlestown, Massachusetts, on August 25, 1856, to John Murphy and Jane Smiley; he was born into a family of five (two of his siblings died before he was born). He graduated from Charlestown High School, and—after a pause of many years—earned a degree from Boston University in 1900.

Murphy was brother-in-law to Irish poet and journalist John Boyle O'Reilly. On August 9, 1890, Murphy took a night walk with O'Reilly (who was at the time suffering from insomnia) to the Hotel Pemberton in Hull; they returned home at around 12am. As Murphy was leaving O'Reilly said to him "Be sure and be over early in the morning, Jack, so that you can go with me and the children to Mass at Nantasket". O'Reilly died later that morning on August 10, of a chloral hydrate overdose. While not the last person to see him alive, Murphy was one of the last people to see him before he overdosed. Murphy, along with his niece Mary, accompanied O'Reilly's body on a Boston steamer to Charlestown.

== Political career ==
Murphy was elected to the Massachusetts House of Representatives in 1883, re-elected twice, and then elected to the Massachusetts Senate in 1886, where he served for one term.

In the run-up to the 1899 mayoral election, Murphy narrowly lost the Democratic nomination to Patrick Collins. Murphy subsequently announced his intent to cross party lines and vote for the Republican candidate, Thomas N. Hart. The votes of Murphy and his followers in support of Hart contributed to Collins' defeat, and was referred to as a "knifing" in contemporary news reports.

On February 25, 1914, Murphy was named as chairman of the Boston Finance Commission, and under suspension of the rules, he was immediately confirmed by the Massachusetts Executive Council.

In 1919, Murphy resigned from the Finance Commission to accept the office of the Fire Commissioner of Boston.

In the 1921 mayoral election, non-partisan in nature and held on December 13, Murphy lost to James Michael Curley by 2,315 votes.

== Personal life ==
Murphy married 21-year-old Mary Daly on October 24, 1893; they had 4 daughters. Murphy died on December 28, 1932, at the age of 76. He was interred in Old Calvary Cemetery (now known as Mount Calvary Cemetery, in the Roslindale neighborhood of Boston).
