= John M. Clark =

American businessman and politician

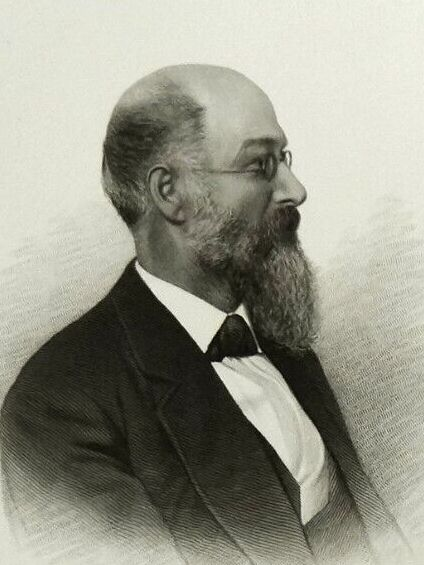
- Clark, circa 1879

Suffolk County Sheriff
- In office 1855–1883
- Preceded by: Joseph Eveleth
- Succeeded by: John B. O'Brien

Personal details
- Born: August 10, 1821 Boston
- Died: June 22, 1902 (aged 80) Boston
- Party: Republican

John Moorehead Clark (August 10, 1821 – June 22, 1902) was an American politician who served as Suffolk County Sheriff from 1855 to 1883. He was the first elected sheriff.

== Early life and business career ==
Clark was born on August 10, 1821, in Boston to Alexander and Matilda (Philips) Clark. He attended the Franklin School, where he studied under Richard Green Parker. He graduated in 1835 and went to work for Thomas B. Vose, Boston partner of the New Orleans commission house Bridge, Vose, & Co. He remained there until the business failed during the Panic of 1837. He then worked in the dry goods store of William P. Tenney, where he was with fellow dry goods salesman Eben Dyer Jordan. In 1840 he became a bookkeeper for Manning & Glover, a dry goods concern. From 1843 to 1846 he was a partner in the firm. He then became a member of Clark, Bingham, & Co., which shipped produce to San Francisco. He sold his interest in the business in 1854.

== Politics ==
In 1854, Clark was elected to the Boston Common Council. In 1855 he was a member of the Board of Aldermen.

On March 31, 1855, Clark was appointed sheriff of Suffolk County, Massachusetts, by Governor Henry Gardner. That year, the Massachusetts Constitution was amended to provide for the popular election of sheriffs and other county sheriffs. He chose to run for the office and was nominated by the Republican and Whig parties. He received 55% to Democrat Rufus B. Bradford's 30% and Know Nothing Daniel J. Coburn's 15%. In 1859 he was reelected over Democrat Isaac Hull Wright 60% to 40%. In 1862 and 1865 he received the nominations of both the Republican and Democratic parties. In 1868 the Democrats nominated Union Army General Robert Cowdin and Clark defeated him 62% to 38%. In 1871, 1874, 1877, and 1880, Clark secured the nominations of both the Republicans and the Democrats. He was succeeded by his longtime deputy John B. O'Brien.

As sheriff, Clark oversaw the execution of four convicted murderers (James McGee, James McElhaney, George W. Pemberton, and Thomas W. Piper). Prior to Piper's execution, the condemned man made a confession to Clark, however Clark found it so revolting he refused to ever have it published. A fifth prisoner, Charles L. Carter, died of a Pulmonary hemorrhage before he could be executed. On September 11, 1862, Appleton Oaksmith, who had been convicted of fitting out a vessel for the slave trade escaped from Charles Street Jail and fled to England. The officer who was suspected of aiding Oaksmith in his escape was fired. Oaksmith's mother Elizabeth Oakes Smith eventually secured a presidential pardon for him.

During the American Civil War, Clark, an abolitionist, served as chairman of the Ward 5 committee to secure voluntary enlistment and provide money to soldiers' families during their absence. The committee was able to meet its enlistment quota and avoid a draft. Clark was also a member of the Massachusetts Light Infantry and was detailed to defend Fort Warren in 1861. He was one of two men sent by governor John Albion Andrew, to represent Massachusetts at the dedication of the Gettysburg National Cemetery on November 19, 1863.

Clark was the Republican nominee in the 1885 Boston mayoral election. He lost to Democratic incumbent Hugh O'Brien 60% to 40%.

== Personal life and death ==
Clark attended the Bowdoin Square Baptist Church. On July 27, 1841, he became the first person baptised in the church.

Clark and his wife had two sons, George L. Clark (1850–1912) and John M. Clark Jr. (1856–1862). George L. Clark was a millionaire real estate man and a member of the Massachusetts House of Representatives in 1883 and 1884.

Clark was a 32nd degree Freemasonry and served as the leader of the De Molay commandery of the Knights Templars from 1872 to 1876.

Clark died on June 22, 1902, at his home in Boston's Back Bay. He was buried in Mount Auburn Cemetery.
