= Boston City Charter =

American local government document

Overview
- Jurisdiction: City of Boston
- Chambers: Boston City Council
- Executive: Mayor of Boston

The Boston City Charter is a series of State statutes which codifies a system of rules for the government of the City of Boston, Massachusetts. The Charter is not a typical city constitution but rather a series of amendments, General Court rulings, and case law which form the basis of government. The central organs of the Boston City Charter are the Mayoral Office and City Council. The composition of these offices, their term length, manner of election, and scope of power have changed throughout the years.

== History ==
Before Boston was incorporated as a city in 1822, it shared a similar manner of government to other New England towns. This meant that Boston, then known as "Town of Boston", was governed by a 7-member Board of Selectmen who would elect then among themselves an executive office of "Intendant". To serve as legislature there was a "Board of Assistants". The Assistants were given a mix of legislative and executive powers and were elected from Boston's then 12 wards. As with other New England towns the town meeting was still to be the primary democratic body of Boston and these executive offices would govern when in between these general sessions.

=== First City Charter ===
Due to the growing population of port cities like Boston, the Commonwealth of Massachusetts passed an amendment in 1820 to allow the General Court to define and grant city forms of government to towns over 12,000 people. When Boston voted to become a city in 1822, the position of Intendant was replaced with Mayor, the Board of Assistants was renamed the Common Council, and the Selectmen were renamed Aldermen. With the population growing, the citizens of Boston wanted change in the system of government. Many felt a town meeting form of government was insufficient and impracticable with Boston's increasing population. Logistically speaking, a town meeting was near impossible due to the fact there was no hall large enough to fit all eligible voters. The changes brought forward in 1822 for the reorganization of local government were passed with 2797 votes for and 1881 against. Some citizens, including John Quincy Adams, were worried the new manner of government would be susceptible to corruption and that the "pure democracy of a town meeting [was] more suited to the character of the people of New England."

This new government was to have a Mayor as chief executive officer who was elected to a one-year term, eight Aldermen, as well as one member of each ward being elected to a School Committee. The School Committee, along with the Aldermen and Mayor, would be in charge of education in the City. The Mayor was not an independent actor and instead would operate alongside the Alderman. The Mayor would be presiding officer of this executive board but would not have veto power. The Mayor did, however, have the sole power to nominate candidates for city office.

The Mayor and Aldermen would serve as the upper part of the City Council, with the lower part being made up of four members from each of Boston's 12 wards. These two branches of the Council would have negative power over each other. The upper part taking the role of Selectmen from the old system and the lower part taking the role of the open town meeting. The two parts were to have similar executive power in order to quell concerns from some citizens as to what they saw as a deterioration of the traditional form of New England democracy.

=== Revised Charter of 1854 ===
Following the incorporation of Boston as a city in 1822 and formation of a city government, the next time large changes were made to local government came in 1854. Boston's population was growing rapidly, from 43,298 in 1820 to 138,788 in 1850, and with the increase in population many felt the need to once again reform the government. The main changes made were the expansion of the Board of Aldermen from eight members to 12, the enlargement of the School Committee to six members from each ward, and the removal of the Mayor's right to vote at executive board meetings.

=== Acts of 1909 ===
The modern government of Boston can be traced to a 1909 act of the Massachusetts General Court. In this act, the General Court abolished the offices of Aldermen, Street Commissioner, Clerk of the Common Council, Clerk of Committees, and all the subordinate offices of these officials. The act replaced and centralized these positions into the Office of Mayor and City Council. The Council, with approval from the Mayor, was given the power to create offices it saw fit and appoint and remove the holders of these offices. The Council was also given power of approving the budget, as presented by the Mayor. The City Council was also to be given power of land use (with exception of School land), and the purchase and sale of that property.

The Council was to have nine members. The three candidates with the highest number of votes would serve a term of three years, the three next highest a term of two years, and the three next highest a term of one year. The members of the City Council would vote among themselves as to the President of the Council for the municipal year. The Mayor would be elected to office for a four-year term and was subject to the possibility of recall after two years.

== Modern institutions ==
Boston's current charter states there is to be a Mayor, elected to a four-year term, who is the city's chief executive. The Mayor in capacity as chief executive is to approve any ordinance, order, or resolution from the City Council they see fit. The City Council is to maintain legislative functions, control of the City budget, create agencies, making land use decisions, and serve as check to the Mayor's executive. The City Councilors are to receive a salary that is half of the Mayor's salary.
