= Mayor of Boston =

Chief executive of Boston, Massachusetts

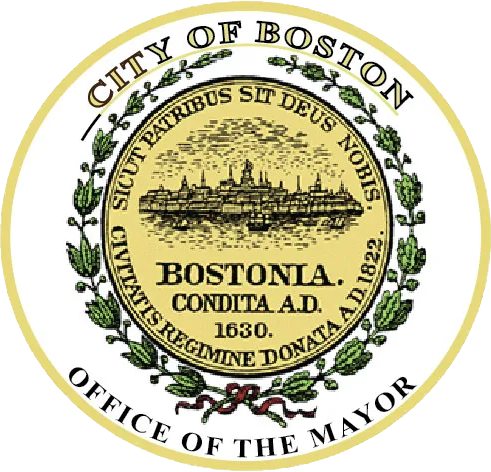
- Seal

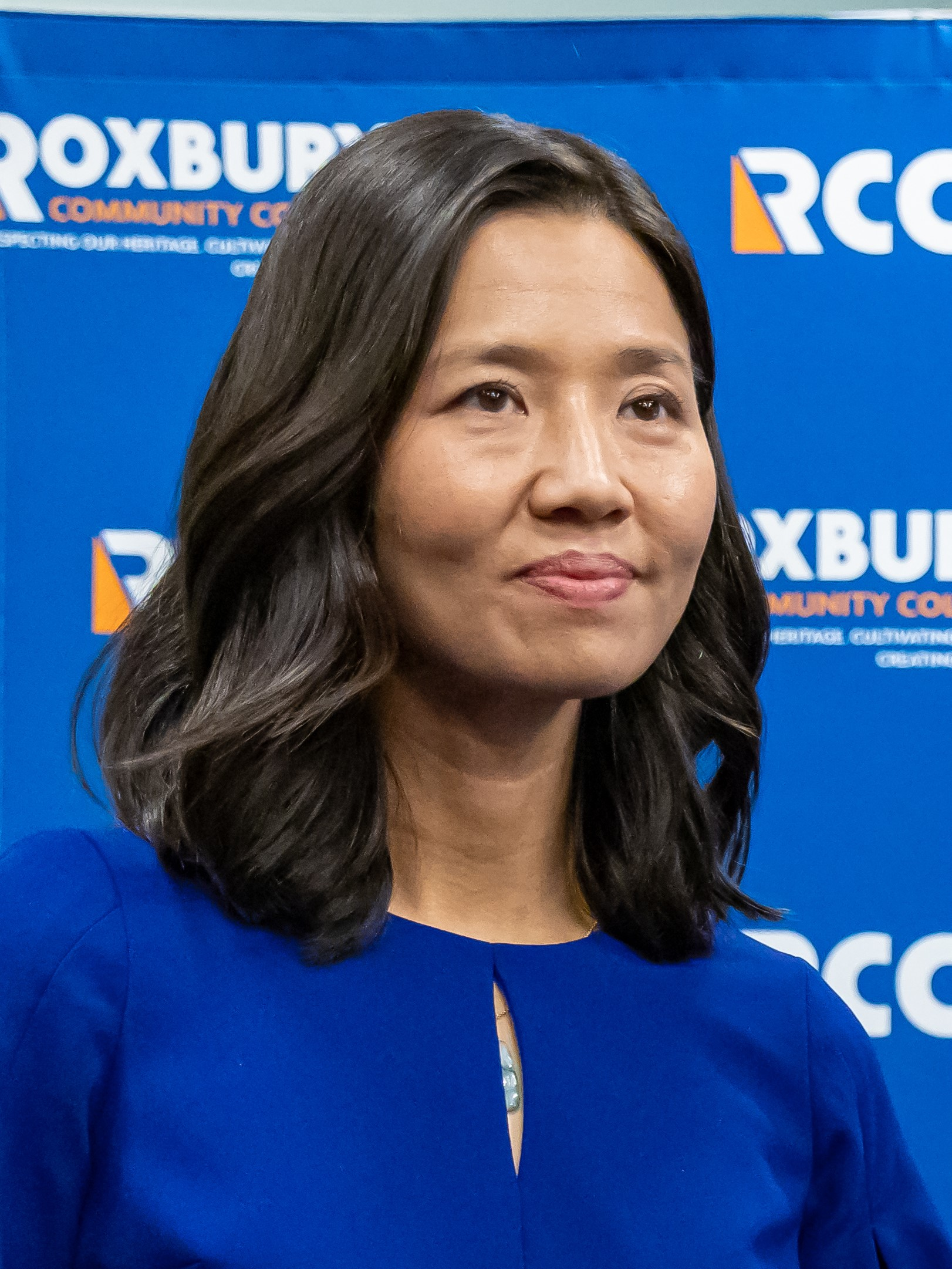
- Incumbent; Michelle Wu since November 16, 2021
- Style: His/Her Honor
- Type: Chief executive
- Member of: Board of Aldermen (1822–1854)
- Residence: None official
- Seat: Boston City Hall
- Nominator: Non-partisan nominating petition
- Appointer: Popular vote
- Term length: Four years
- Constituting instrument: Boston City Charter
- Precursor: Boston Board of Selectmen
- Formation: Original Post: 1822; Current form: 1909
- First holder: John Phillips
- Salary: $199,000 (2018)
- Website: boston.gov/departments/mayors-office

The mayor of Boston is the head of the municipal government in Boston, Massachusetts, United States. Boston has a mayor–council government. Boston's mayoral elections are nonpartisan (as are all municipal elections in Boston), and elect a mayor to a four-year term; there are no term limits. The mayor's office is in Boston City Hall, in Government Center.

The current mayor of Boston is Michelle Wu.

== History ==
Prior to 1822, there was no mayor of Boston, because Boston was incorporated as a town. In Massachusetts, a town is typically governed by a town meeting, with a board of selectmen handling regular business. Boston was the first community in Massachusetts to receive a city charter, which was granted in 1822. Under the terms of the new charter, the mayor was elected annually. In June 1895, the charter was amended, and the mayor's term was increased to two years.

In 1909, the Republican-controlled state legislature enacted strong-mayor charter changes it hoped would dampen the rising power of Democratic Irish Americans. Adopted by public vote in the November 1909 general election, changes included extending the mayoral term to four years, and making the post formally non-partisan. The reforms did not have the intended effect; the first mayor elected under the new charter was Democrat John F. Fitzgerald ("Honey Fitz"), and every mayor since Republican Malcolm Nichols (1926–1930) has been known to be a Democrat.

In a bid to temper the rising power of James Michael Curley, the state legislature in 1918 passed legislation barring the mayor of Boston from serving consecutive terms in office; Curley was prevented from running for re-election twice by this law (November 1925 and November 1933). The law was repealed in 1939, after Curley's political career appeared to be in decline.

Another charter change was enacted in 1949, partly in response to Curley's fourth term (1946–1950), during which he served prison time for crimes committed in an earlier term. Changes included adding a preliminary election to narrow the field to two mayoral candidates in advance of the general election, changing the Boston City Council from having 22 members (one from each city ward) to having nine members (elected at-large), and giving the council ability to override some mayoral vetoes. These changes went into effect in 1951, resulting in the first term of John B. Hynes being shortened to two years.

From 1951 through 1991, Boston mayoral elections were held the year before presidential elections (e.g. mayoral election in 1951, presidential election in 1952). Starting in 1993, due to the election held following Raymond Flynn's appointment as United States Ambassador to the Holy See, Boston mayoral elections are held the year following presidential elections (e.g. presidential election in 1992, mayoral election in 1993).

=== Salary ===
In June 2018, the council voted to increase the salary of the mayor to $207,000, effective after the mayoral election of November 2021 (term starting in January 2022); this increased the salary of councillors to $103,500, effective after the council elections of November 2019 (terms starting in January 2020). In October 2022, the council voted to increase the salary of the mayor to $250,000.

=== Numbering ===
There is no official count of Boston's mayors. The City of Boston does not number its mayors and numbering has been inconsistent over time. For example, Thomas Menino was referred to as the 47th mayor at the time he was sworn in, yet his successor, Marty Walsh, was identified as the 54th. The Walsh administration cited Wikipedia for its use of 54. (Note: The Wikipedia article itself first applied numbers to the list of mayors in August 2007, without citing a specific source for the numbering. The numbering was removed in May 2025.) That numbering scheme counted persons who served as elected mayors and counted those who served non-consecutive terms more than once (for example, James Michael Curley served four non-consecutive terms and was counted four times), however, for reasons that are unclear, Leonard R. Cutter, who served as acting mayor in late 1873, was also included in the count. Kim Janey, who became acting mayor in March 2021, referred to herself as the 55th mayor.

== List of mayors ==
Mayor	Took office	Left office	Tenure	Party (Note: Municipal elections in Boston have been nonpartisan since 1909. The parties listed here are for informational purposes only.)	Election
John Phillips (1770–1823)	May 1, 1822	May 1, 1823	1 year, 0 days	Federalist	1822
Josiah Quincy III (1772–1864)	May 1, 1823	January 5, 1829	5 years, 249 days	Federalist	1823
Josiah Quincy III (1772–1864)	May 1, 1823	January 5, 1829	5 years, 249 days	Federalist	1824
Josiah Quincy III (1772–1864)	May 1, 1823	January 5, 1829	5 years, 249 days	Federalist	Apr. 1825
Josiah Quincy III (1772–1864)	May 1, 1823	January 5, 1829	5 years, 249 days	Federalist	Dec. 1825
Josiah Quincy III (1772–1864)	May 1, 1823	January 5, 1829	5 years, 249 days	Federalist	1826
Josiah Quincy III (1772–1864)	May 1, 1823	January 5, 1829	5 years, 249 days	Federalist	1827
Harrison Gray Otis (1765–1848)	January 5, 1829	January 2, 1832	2 years, 362 days	Federalist	1828
Harrison Gray Otis (1765–1848)	January 5, 1829	January 2, 1832	2 years, 362 days	Federalist	1829
Harrison Gray Otis (1765–1848)	January 5, 1829	January 2, 1832	2 years, 362 days	Federalist	1830
Charles Wells (1786–1866)	January 2, 1832	January 6, 1834	2 years, 4 days	National Republican	1831
Charles Wells (1786–1866)	January 2, 1832	January 6, 1834	2 years, 4 days	National Republican	1832
Theodore Lyman II (1792–1849)	January 6, 1834	January 4, 1836	1 year, 363 days	Democratic	1833
Theodore Lyman II (1792–1849)	January 6, 1834	January 4, 1836	1 year, 363 days	Democratic	1834
Samuel Turell Armstrong (1784–1850)	January 4, 1836	January 1, 1837	363 days	Whig	1835
Samuel Atkins Eliot (1798–1862)	January 1, 1837	January 6, 1840	3 years, 5 days	Whig	1836
Samuel Atkins Eliot (1798–1862)	January 1, 1837	January 6, 1840	3 years, 5 days	Whig	1837
Samuel Atkins Eliot (1798–1862)	January 1, 1837	January 6, 1840	3 years, 5 days	Whig	1838
Jonathan Chapman (1807–1848)	January 6, 1840	January 2, 1843	2 years, 361 days	Whig	1839
Jonathan Chapman (1807–1848)	January 6, 1840	January 2, 1843	2 years, 361 days	Whig	1840
Jonathan Chapman (1807–1848)	January 6, 1840	January 2, 1843	2 years, 361 days	Whig	1841
Martin Brimmer (1793–1847)	January 2, 1843	January 6, 1845	2 years, 4 days	Whig	1842
Martin Brimmer (1793–1847)	January 2, 1843	January 6, 1845	2 years, 4 days	Whig	1843
William Parker (1793–1873); Acting	January 6, 1845	February 27, 1845	52 days	Whig	–
Thomas Aspinwall Davis (1798–1845)	February 27, 1845	November 22, 1845 (Note: Died in office.)	268 days	Native American	1844–45
Benson Leavitt (1797–1869); Acting	November 22, 1845	December 11, 1845	19 days	Whig	–
Josiah Quincy IV (1802–1882); Acting, then elected	December 11, 1845	January 5, 1846	25 days	Whig	–
Josiah Quincy IV (1802–1882); Acting, then elected	January 5, 1846	January 1, 1849	2 years, 362 days	Whig	Dec. 1845
Josiah Quincy IV (1802–1882); Acting, then elected	January 5, 1846	January 1, 1849	2 years, 362 days	Whig	1846
Josiah Quincy IV (1802–1882); Acting, then elected	January 5, 1846	January 1, 1849	2 years, 362 days	Whig	1847
John P. Bigelow (1797–1872)	January 1, 1849	January 5, 1852	3 years, 4 days	Whig	1848
John P. Bigelow (1797–1872)	January 1, 1849	January 5, 1852	3 years, 4 days	Whig	1849
John P. Bigelow (1797–1872)	January 1, 1849	January 5, 1852	3 years, 4 days	Whig	1850
Benjamin Seaver (1795–1856) (Note: Benjamin L. Allen, the Chairman of the Board of Aldermen, served in an acting capacity from December 12, 1853, to January 9, 1854, during deadlocked ballots for the 1853–54 election.)	January 5, 1852	January 2, 1854	1 year, 362 days	Whig	1851
Benjamin Seaver (1795–1856)	January 5, 1852	January 2, 1854	1 year, 362 days	Whig	1852
Jerome V. C. Smith (1800–1879)	January 2, 1854	January 7, 1856	2 years, 5 days	American	1853–54
Jerome V. C. Smith (1800–1879)	January 2, 1854	January 7, 1856	2 years, 5 days	American	Dec. 1854
Alexander H. Rice (1818–1895)	January 7, 1856	January 4, 1858	1 year, 362 days	Independent	1855
Alexander H. Rice (1818–1895)	January 7, 1856	January 4, 1858	1 year, 362 days	Independent	1856
Frederic W. Lincoln Jr. (1817–1898); 1st time	January 4, 1858	January 7, 1861	3 years, 3 days	Republican	1857
Frederic W. Lincoln Jr. (1817–1898); 1st time	January 4, 1858	January 7, 1861	3 years, 3 days	Republican	1858
Frederic W. Lincoln Jr. (1817–1898); 1st time	January 4, 1858	January 7, 1861	3 years, 3 days	Republican	1859
Joseph Wightman (1812–1885)	January 7, 1861	January 5, 1863	1 year, 363 days	Democratic	1860
Joseph Wightman (1812–1885)	January 7, 1861	January 5, 1863	1 year, 363 days	Democratic	1861
Frederic W. Lincoln Jr. (1817–1898); 2nd time	January 5, 1863	January 7, 1867	4 years, 2 days	Republican	1862
Frederic W. Lincoln Jr. (1817–1898); 2nd time	January 5, 1863	January 7, 1867	4 years, 2 days	Republican	1863
Frederic W. Lincoln Jr. (1817–1898); 2nd time	January 5, 1863	January 7, 1867	4 years, 2 days	Republican	1864
Frederic W. Lincoln Jr. (1817–1898); 2nd time	January 5, 1863	January 7, 1867	4 years, 2 days	Republican	1865
Otis Norcross (1811–1882)	January 7, 1867	January 6, 1868	364 days	Republican	1866
Nathaniel B. Shurtleff (1810–1874)	January 6, 1868	January 2, 1871	2 years, 361 days	Democratic	1867
Nathaniel B. Shurtleff (1810–1874)	January 6, 1868	January 2, 1871	2 years, 361 days	Democratic	1868
Nathaniel B. Shurtleff (1810–1874)	January 6, 1868	January 2, 1871	2 years, 361 days	Democratic	1869
William Gaston (1820–1894)	January 2, 1871	January 6, 1873	2 years, 4 days	Democratic	1870
William Gaston (1820–1894)	January 2, 1871	January 6, 1873	2 years, 4 days	Democratic	1871
Henry L. Pierce (1825–1896); 1st time	January 6, 1873	November 29, 1873 (Note: Pierce resigned in order to become US representative for Massachusetts's 3rd congressional district.)	327 days	Republican	1872
Leonard R. Cutter (1825–1894); Acting	November 29, 1873	January 5, 1874	37 days	Democratic	–
Samuel C. Cobb (1826–1891)	January 5, 1874	January 1, 1877	2 years, 362 days	Independent	1873
Samuel C. Cobb (1826–1891)	January 5, 1874	January 1, 1877	2 years, 362 days	Independent	1874
Samuel C. Cobb (1826–1891)	January 5, 1874	January 1, 1877	2 years, 362 days	Independent	1875
Frederick O. Prince (1818–1899); 1st time	January 1, 1877	January 7, 1878	1 year, 6 days	Democratic	1876
Henry L. Pierce (1825–1896); 2nd time	January 7, 1878	January 6, 1879	364 days	Republican	1877
Frederick O. Prince (1818–1899); 2nd time	January 6, 1879	January 2, 1882	2 years, 361 days	Democratic	1878
Frederick O. Prince (1818–1899); 2nd time	January 6, 1879	January 2, 1882	2 years, 361 days	Democratic	1879
Frederick O. Prince (1818–1899); 2nd time	January 6, 1879	January 2, 1882	2 years, 361 days	Democratic	1880
Samuel Abbott Green (1830–1918)	January 2, 1882	January 1, 1883	364 days	Republican	1881
Albert Palmer (1831–1887)	January 1, 1883	January 7, 1884	1 year, 6 days	Democratic	1882
Augustus Pearl Martin (1835–1902)	January 7, 1884	January 5, 1885	364 days	Republican	1883
Hugh O'Brien (1827–1895)	January 5, 1885	January 7, 1889	4 years, 2 days	Democratic	1884
Hugh O'Brien (1827–1895)	January 5, 1885	January 7, 1889	4 years, 2 days	Democratic	1885
Hugh O'Brien (1827–1895)	January 5, 1885	January 7, 1889	4 years, 2 days	Democratic	1886
Hugh O'Brien (1827–1895)	January 5, 1885	January 7, 1889	4 years, 2 days	Democratic	1887
Thomas N. Hart (1829–1927); 1st time	January 7, 1889	December 31, 1890	1 year, 358 days	Republican	1888
Thomas N. Hart (1829–1927); 1st time	January 7, 1889	December 31, 1890	1 year, 358 days	Republican	1889
Nathan Matthews Jr. (1854–1927)	January 1, 1891	January 7, 1895	4 years, 6 days	Democratic	1890
Nathan Matthews Jr. (1854–1927)	January 1, 1891	January 7, 1895	4 years, 6 days	Democratic	1891
Nathan Matthews Jr. (1854–1927)	January 1, 1891	January 7, 1895	4 years, 6 days	Democratic	1892
Nathan Matthews Jr. (1854–1927)	January 1, 1891	January 7, 1895	4 years, 6 days	Democratic	1893
Edwin Upton Curtis (1861–1922)	January 7, 1895	January 6, 1896	364 days	Republican	1894
Josiah Quincy VI (1859–1919)	January 6, 1896	January 1, 1900	3 years, 360 days	Democratic	1895
Josiah Quincy VI (1859–1919)	January 6, 1896	January 1, 1900	3 years, 360 days	Democratic	1897
Thomas N. Hart (1829–1927); 2nd time	January 1, 1900	January 6, 1902	2 years, 5 days	Republican	1899
Patrick Collins (1844–1905)	January 6, 1902	September 13, 1905	3 years, 250 days	Democratic	1901
Patrick Collins (1844–1905)	January 6, 1902	September 13, 1905	3 years, 250 days	Democratic	1903
Daniel A. Whelton (1872–1953); Acting	September 15, 1905	January 1, 1906	108 days	Democratic	–
John F. Fitzgerald (1863–1950); 1st time	January 1, 1906	January 6, 1908	2 years, 5 days	Democratic	1905
George A. Hibbard (1864–1910)	January 6, 1908	February 7, 1910	2 years, 32 days	Republican	1907
John F. Fitzgerald (1863–1950); 2nd time	February 7, 1910	February 2, 1914	3 years, 360 days	Democratic	1910
James Michael Curley (1874–1958); 1st time	February 2, 1914	February 4, 1918	4 years, 2 days	Democratic	1914
Andrew J. Peters (1872–1938)	February 4, 1918	February 6, 1922	4 years, 2 days	Democratic	1917
James Michael Curley (1874–1958); 2nd time	February 6, 1922	January 4, 1926	3 years, 332 days	Democratic	1921
Malcolm Nichols (1876–1951)	January 4, 1926	January 6, 1930	4 years, 2 days	Republican	1925
James Michael Curley (1874–1958); 3rd time	January 6, 1930	January 1, 1934	3 years, 360 days	Democratic	1929
Frederick Mansfield (1877–1958)	January 1, 1934	January 3, 1938	4 years, 2 days	Democratic	1933
Maurice J. Tobin (1901–1953)	January 3, 1938	January 4, 1945 (Note: Tobin resigned in order to become Governor of Massachusetts.)	7 years, 1 day	Democratic	1937
Maurice J. Tobin (1901–1953)	January 3, 1938	January 4, 1945	7 years, 1 day	Democratic	1941
John E. Kerrigan (1908–1987); Acting	January 4, 1945	January 7, 1946	1 year, 3 days	Democratic	–
James Michael Curley (1874–1958); 4th time (Note: John Hynes served in an acting capacity from June 26 to November 26, 1947, during Curley's incarceration.)	January 7, 1946	January 2, 1950	3 years, 360 days	Democratic	1945
John Hynes (1897–1970)	January 2, 1950	January 4, 1960	10 years, 2 days	Democratic	1949
John Hynes (1897–1970)	January 2, 1950	January 4, 1960	10 years, 2 days	Democratic	1951
John Hynes (1897–1970)	January 2, 1950	January 4, 1960	10 years, 2 days	Democratic	1955
John F. Collins (1919–1995)	January 4, 1960	January 1, 1968	7 years, 362 days	Democratic	1959
John F. Collins (1919–1995)	January 4, 1960	January 1, 1968	7 years, 362 days	Democratic	1963
Kevin White (1929–2012)	January 1, 1968	January 2, 1984	16 years, 1 day	Democratic	1967
Kevin White (1929–2012)	January 1, 1968	January 2, 1984	16 years, 1 day	Democratic	1971
Kevin White (1929–2012)	January 1, 1968	January 2, 1984	16 years, 1 day	Democratic	1975
Kevin White (1929–2012)	January 1, 1968	January 2, 1984	16 years, 1 day	Democratic	1979
Raymond Flynn (born 1939); Mayoralty	January 2, 1984	July 12, 1993 (Note: Flynn resigned in order to become Ambassador to the Holy See.)	9 years, 191 days	Democratic	1983
Raymond Flynn (born 1939); Mayoralty	January 2, 1984	July 12, 1993	9 years, 191 days	Democratic	1987
Raymond Flynn (born 1939); Mayoralty	January 2, 1984	July 12, 1993	9 years, 191 days	Democratic	1991
Thomas Menino (1942–2014); Acting, then elected Mayoralty	July 12, 1993	November 16, 1993	127 days	Democratic	–
Thomas Menino (1942–2014); Acting, then elected Mayoralty	November 16, 1993	January 6, 2014	20 years, 51 days	Democratic	1993
Thomas Menino (1942–2014); Acting, then elected Mayoralty	November 16, 1993	January 6, 2014	20 years, 51 days	Democratic	1997
Thomas Menino (1942–2014); Acting, then elected Mayoralty	November 16, 1993	January 6, 2014	20 years, 51 days	Democratic	2001
Thomas Menino (1942–2014); Acting, then elected Mayoralty	November 16, 1993	January 6, 2014	20 years, 51 days	Democratic	2005
Thomas Menino (1942–2014); Acting, then elected Mayoralty	November 16, 1993	January 6, 2014	20 years, 51 days	Democratic	2009
Marty Walsh (born 1967); Mayoralty	January 6, 2014	March 22, 2021 (Note: Walsh resigned in order to become Secretary of Labor.)	7 years, 75 days	Democratic	2013
Marty Walsh (born 1967); Mayoralty	January 6, 2014	March 22, 2021	7 years, 75 days	Democratic	2017
Kim Janey (born 1965); Acting	March 22, 2021	November 16, 2021	239 days	Democratic	–
Michelle Wu (born 1985); Mayoralty	November 16, 2021	Incumbent	4 years, 322 days	Democratic	2021
Michelle Wu (born 1985); Mayoralty	November 16, 2021	Incumbent	4 years, 322 days	Democratic	2025

== See also ==
- Timeline of Boston
- List of elections in Massachusetts
- List of members of the Boston City Council
- List of mayors of Roxbury, Massachusetts
- List of mayors of Charlestown, Massachusetts
- List of mayors of the 50 largest cities in the United States

== Sources ==
- Allison, Robert; Bulger, William (2011). James Michael Curley. Applewood Books. ISBN 9781933212753.
- O'Neill, Gerard (2012). Rogues and Redeemers. New York: Crown Publisher. ISBN 9780307405364.
