= 1889 Boston mayoral election =

Election in Massachusetts, United States

- December 10, 1889
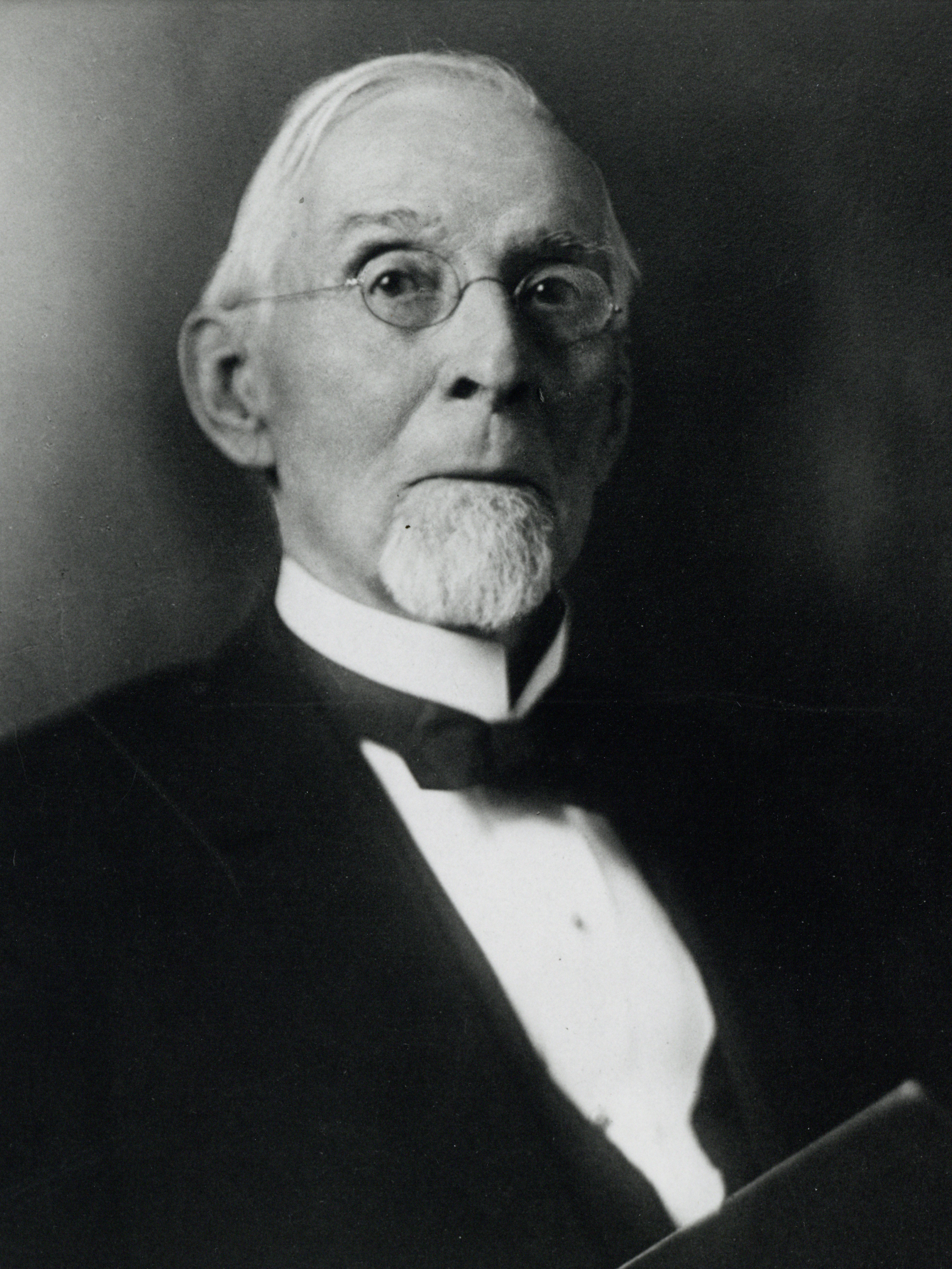

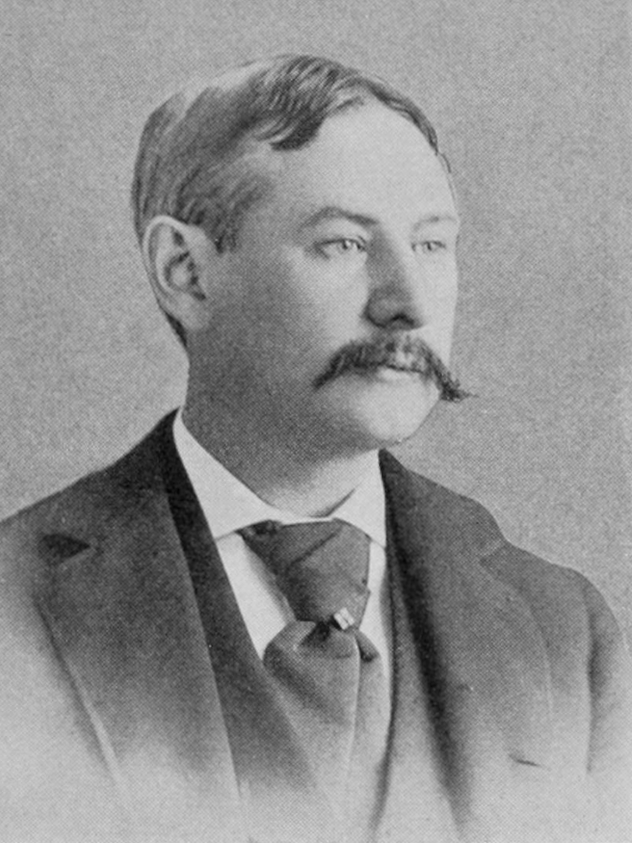
Candidate	Thomas N. Hart	Owen A. Galvin
Party	Republican	Democratic
Popular vote	31,133	25,673
Percentage	54.74%	45.14%
Mayor before election
Thomas N. Hart
Republican
Elected mayor
Thomas N. Hart
Republican

The Boston mayoral election of 1889 saw the reelection of Thomas N. Hart.

== Results ==
1889 Boston mayoral election
Party	Candidate	Votes	%
Republican	Thomas N. Hart (incumbent)	31,133	54.74%
Democratic	Owen A. Galvin	25,673	45.14%
Others	Scattering	71	0.13%
Turnout		56,877	

== See also ==
- List of mayors of Boston, Massachusetts
