= 1888 Boston mayoral election =

Election in Massachusetts, United States

- December 12, 1888
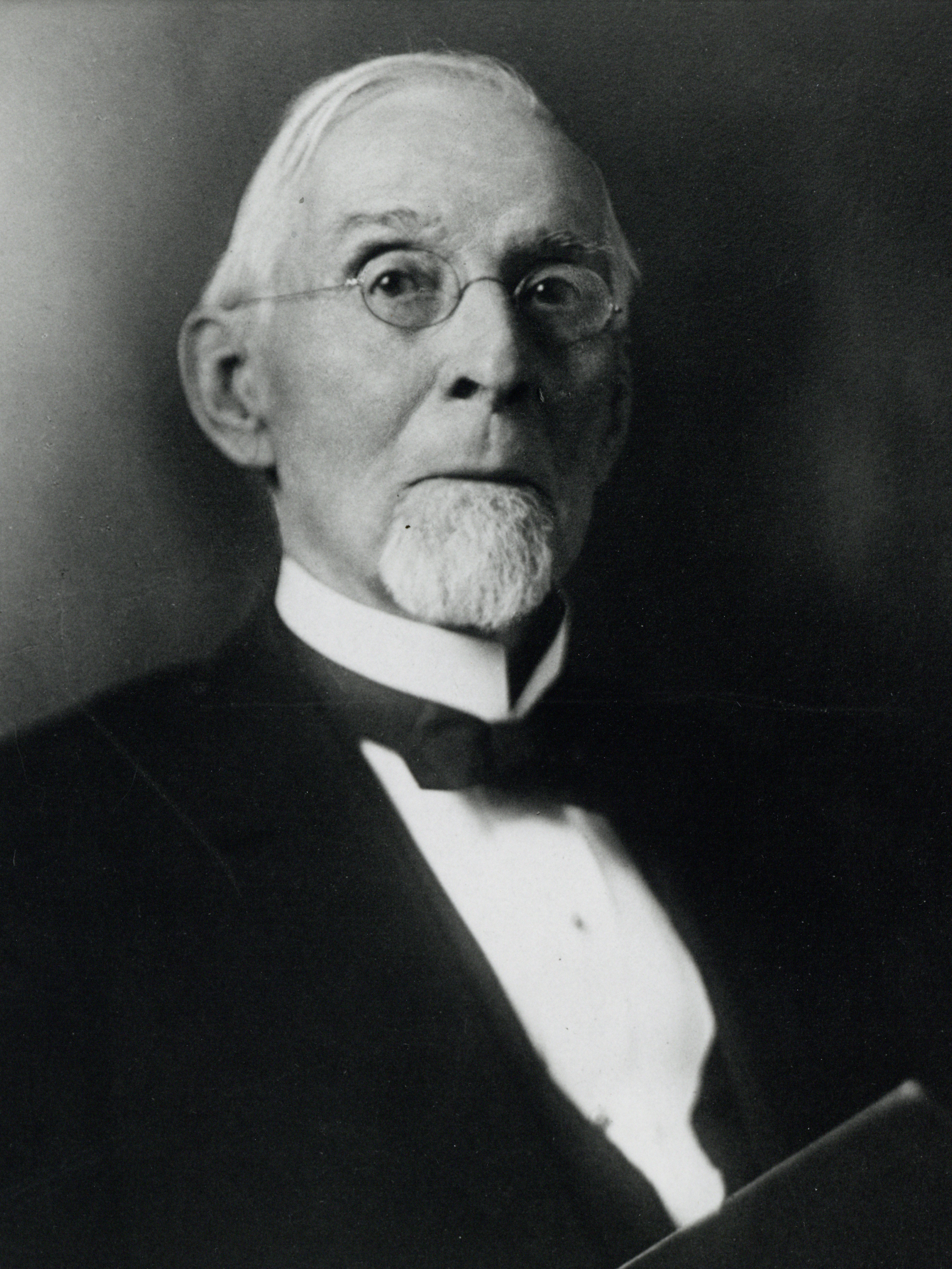

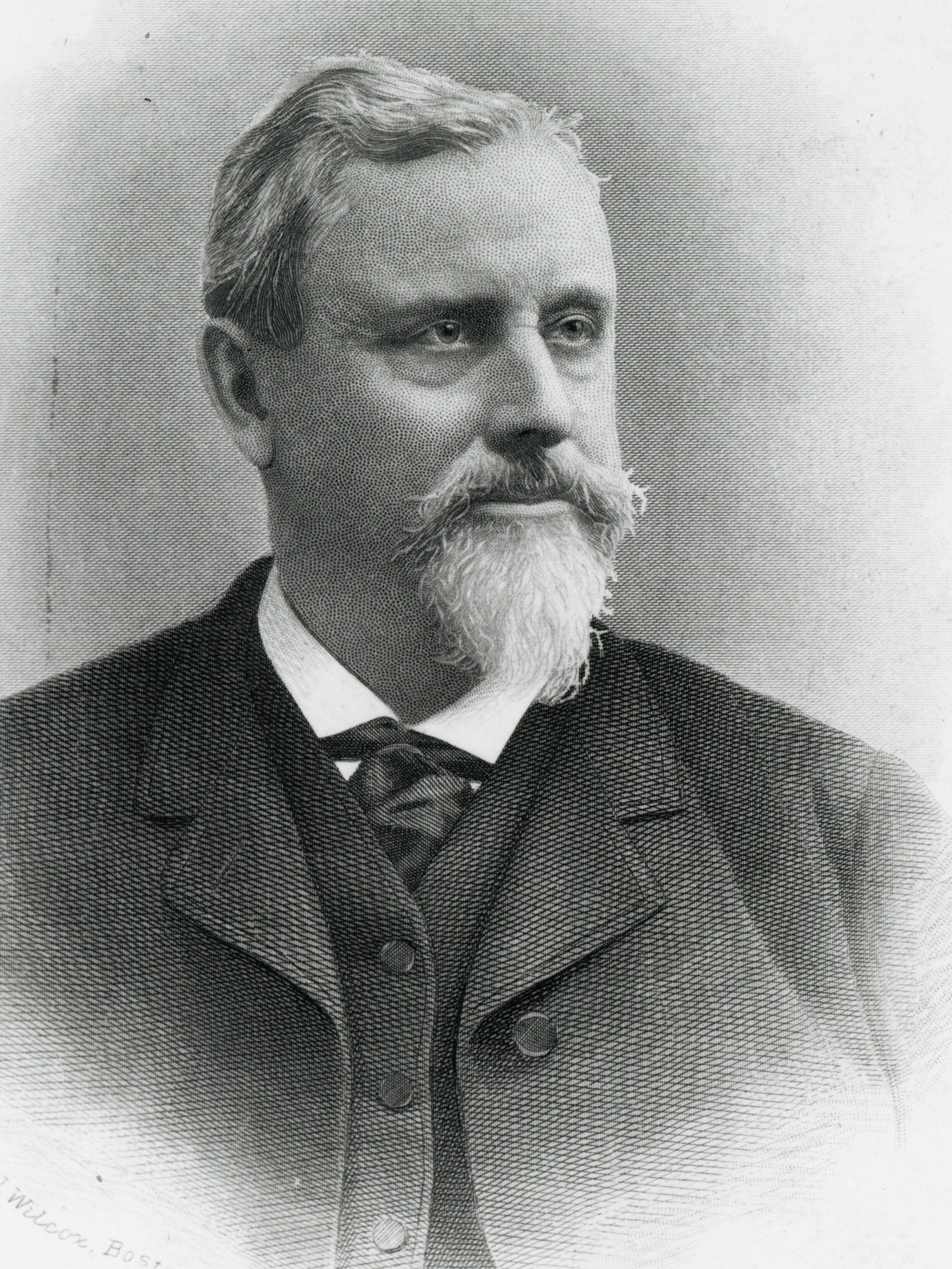
| Candidate | Thomas N. Hart | Hugh O'Brien |
| Party | Republican | Democratic |
| Popular vote | 32,712 | 30,836 |
| Percentage | 51.48% | 48.52% |
Mayor before election
Hugh O'Brien
Democratic
Elected mayor
Thomas N. Hart
Republican

The Boston mayoral election of 1888 saw the election of Thomas N. Hart, who defeated incumbent mayor Hugh O'Brien.

== Results ==
1888 Boston mayoral election
| Party | Candidate | Votes | % |
|---|---|---|---|
| Republican | Thomas N. Hart | 32,712 | 51.48% |
| Democratic | Hugh O'Brien (incumbent) | 30,836 | 48.52% |
| Turnout | | 63,548 | |

== See also ==
- List of mayors of Boston, Massachusetts
