= 1893 Boston mayoral election =

Election in Massachusetts, United States

- December 12, 1893
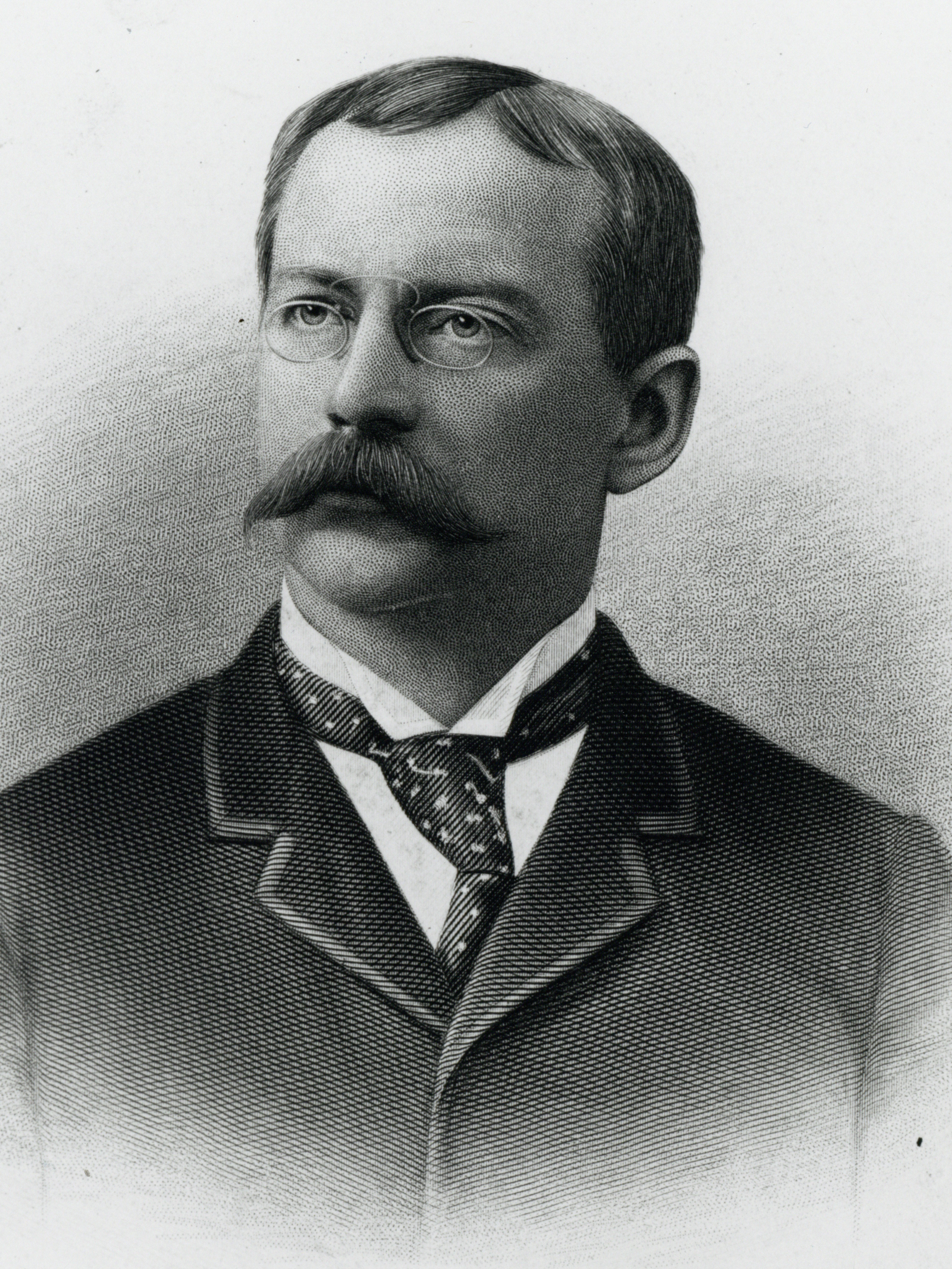

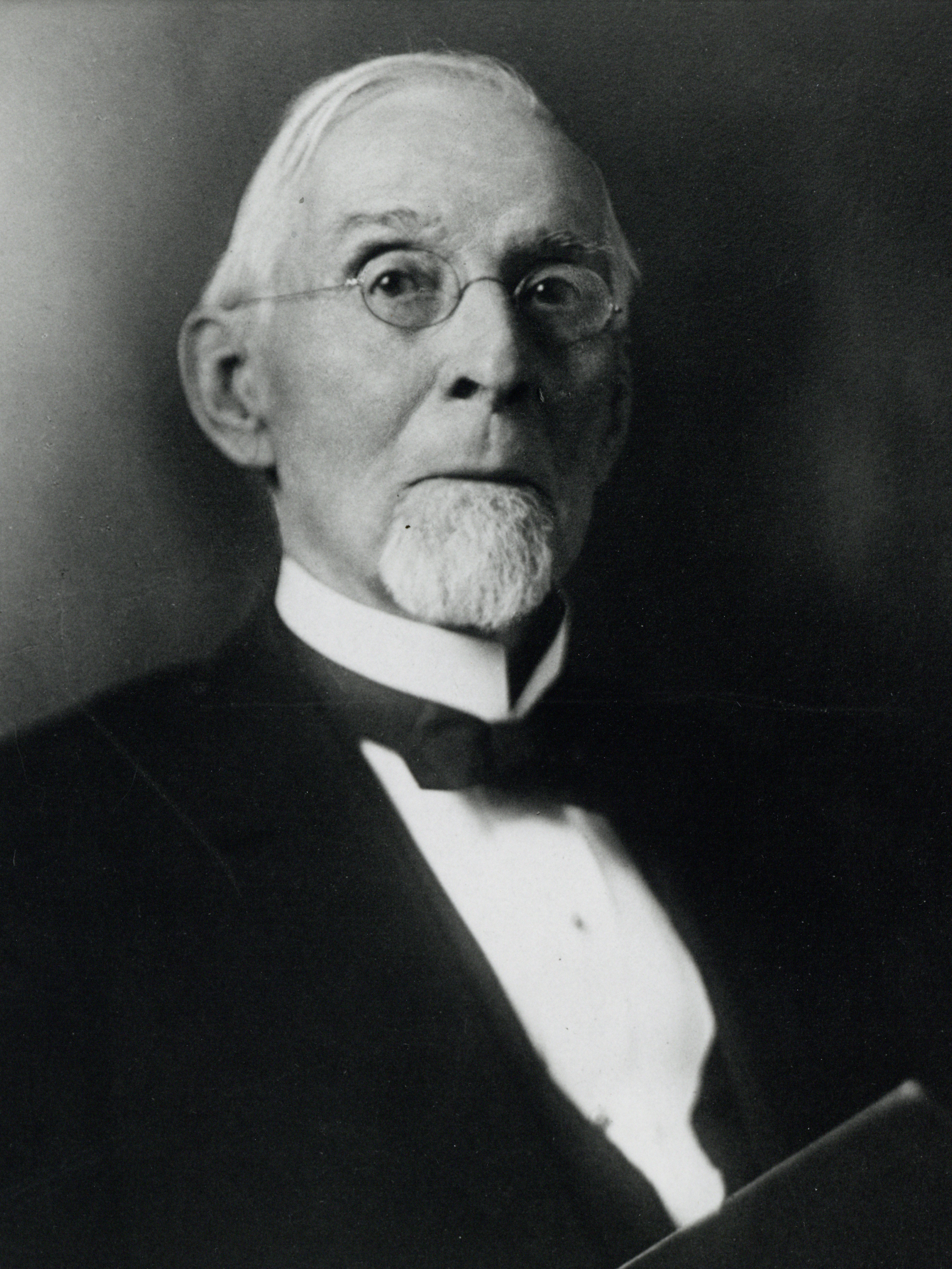
Candidate	Nathan Matthews Jr.	Thomas N. Hart
Party	Democratic	Republican
Popular vote	36,354	31,255
Percentage	53.28%	45.81%
Mayor before election
Nathan Matthews Jr.
Democratic
Elected mayor
Nathan Matthews Jr.
Democratic

The Boston mayoral election of 1893 saw the reelection of Nathan Matthews Jr. to a fourth consecutive term.

While the campaigning had been energetic ahead of the election it was noted that the election day itself was rather quiet in the city of Boston.

== Results ==
1892 Boston mayoral election
Party	Candidate	Votes	%
Democratic	Nathan Matthews Jr. (incumbent)	36,354	53.28%
Republican	Thomas N. Hart	31,255	40.01%
Prohibition	Alonzo Ames Miner	617	0.90%
Others	Scattering	2	0.00%
Turnout		68,228	

== See also ==
- List of mayors of Boston, Massachusetts
