= 1901 Boston mayoral election =

Election in Massachusetts, United States

- December 10, 1901
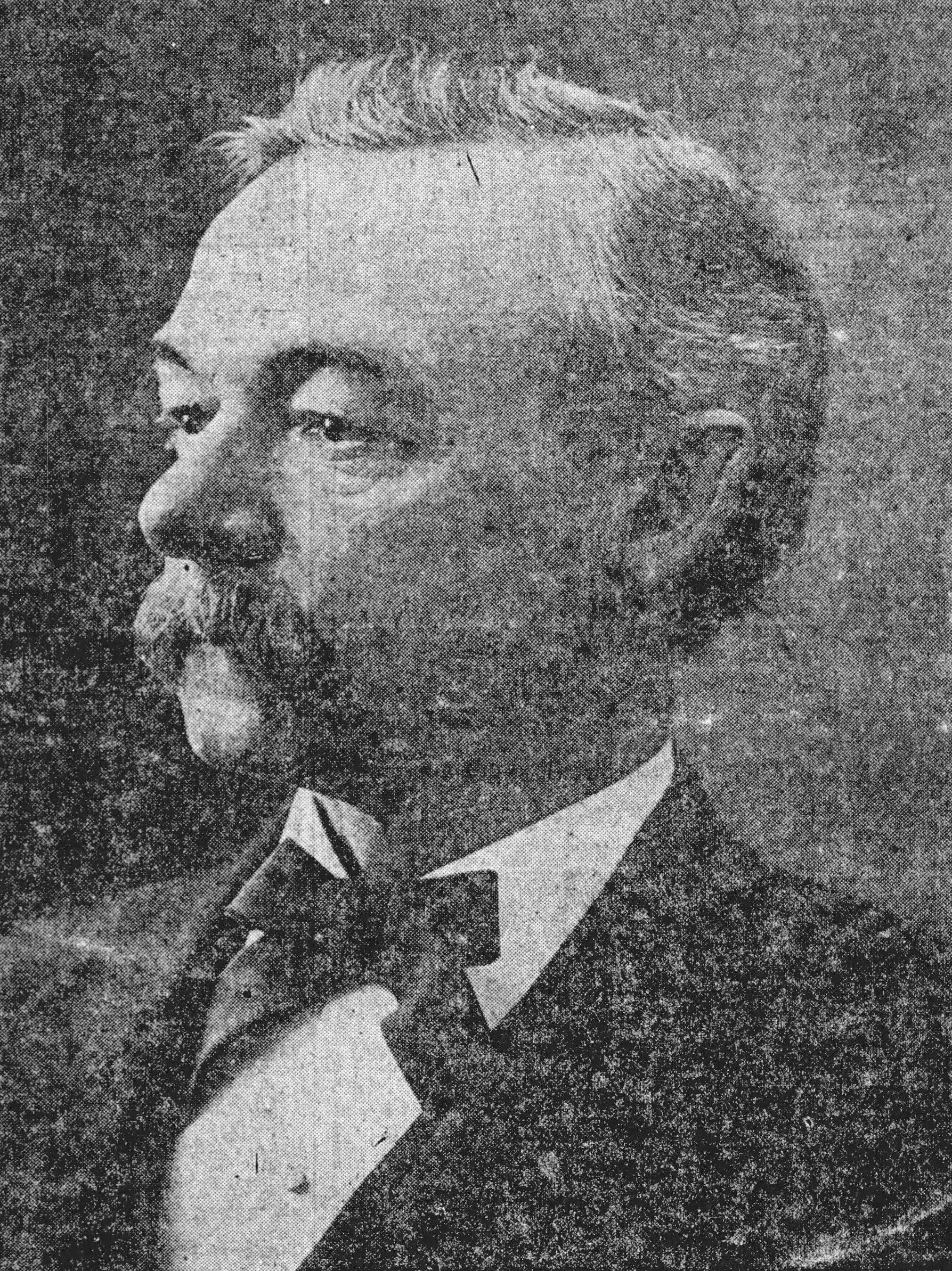

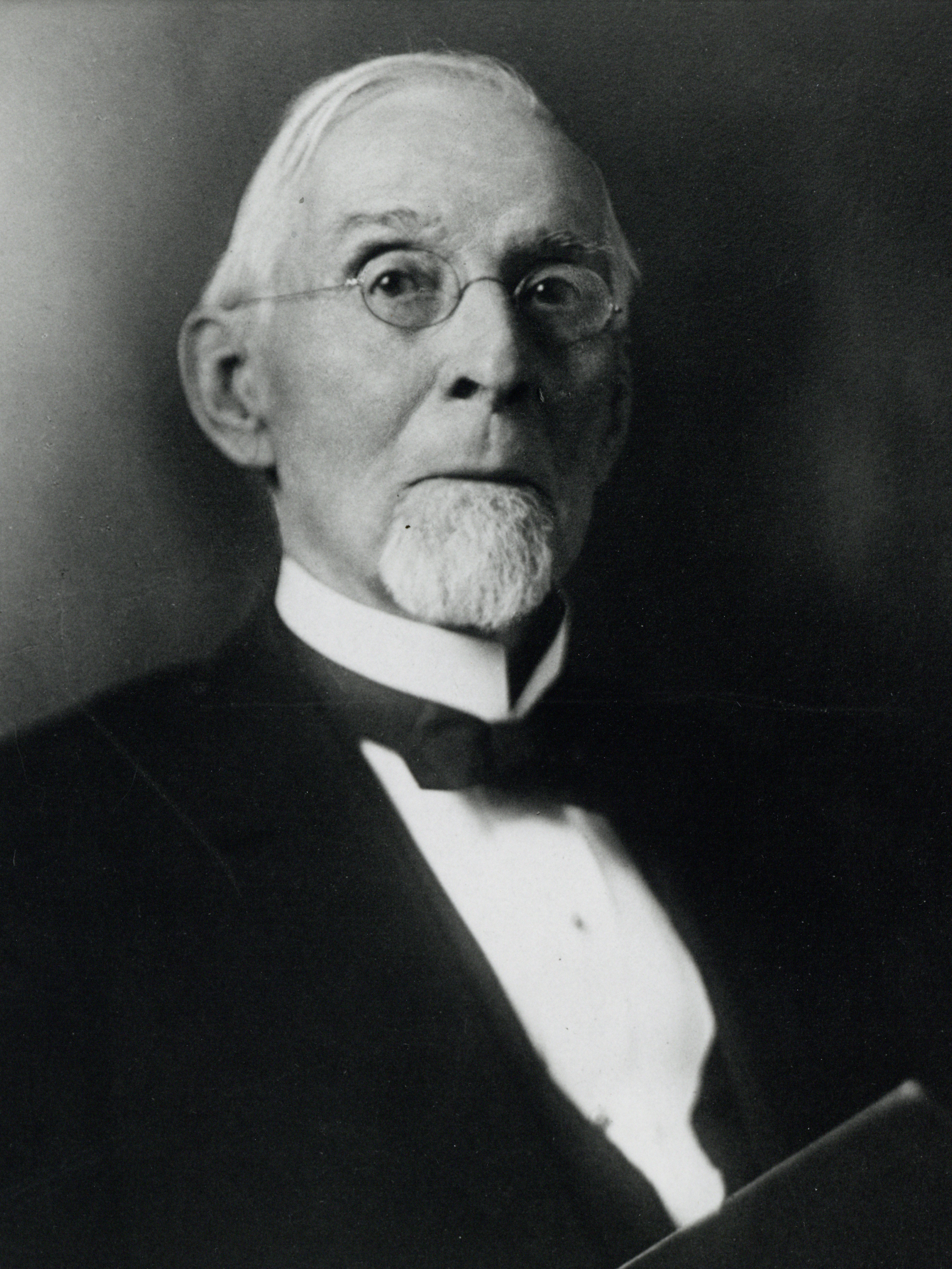
Candidate	Patrick Collins	Thomas N. Hart
Party	Democratic	Republican
Popular vote	52,035	33,196
Percentage	60.1%	38.3%
Mayor before election
Thomas N. Hart
Republican
Elected mayor
Patrick Collins
Democratic

The Boston mayoral election of 1901 occurred on Tuesday, December 10, 1901. Democratic nominee Patrick Collins defeated Republican incumbent mayor Thomas N. Hart and two other contenders.

Collins was inaugurated on Monday, January 6, 1902.

== Candidates ==
- Patrick Collins (Democrat), former member of the United States House of Representatives (1883–1889), Massachusetts Senate (1870–1871), and Massachusetts House of Representatives (1868–1869)
- Thomas N. Hart (Republican), Mayor of Boston since 1900, former Mayor of Boston (1889–1890), Postmaster of Boston (1891–1895), member of the Boston Board of Aldermen (1882–1886), and member of the Boston Common Council (1879–1881)
- Herman W. A. Raasch (Socialist Labor)
- John Weaver Sherman (Socialist)

== Party conventions ==
The Republican convention was held on November 19, 1901, at Association Hall. Incumbent Thomas N. Hart was renominated by acclamation.

The Democratic convention was held on November 20, 1901, at Steinert Hall. Patrick Collins unanimously won the party's nomination for Mayor.

== Results ==
Candidates		General Election	
Candidates		Votes	%
D	Patrick Collins	52,035	60.1%
R	Thomas N. Hart (incumbent)	33,196	38.3%
S	John Weaver Sherman	957	1.1%
SLP	Herman W. A. Raasch	426	0.5%
all others		1	0.0%

== See also ==
- List of mayors of Boston, Massachusetts
