= 1885 Boston mayoral election =

Election in Massachusetts, United States

- December 15, 1885
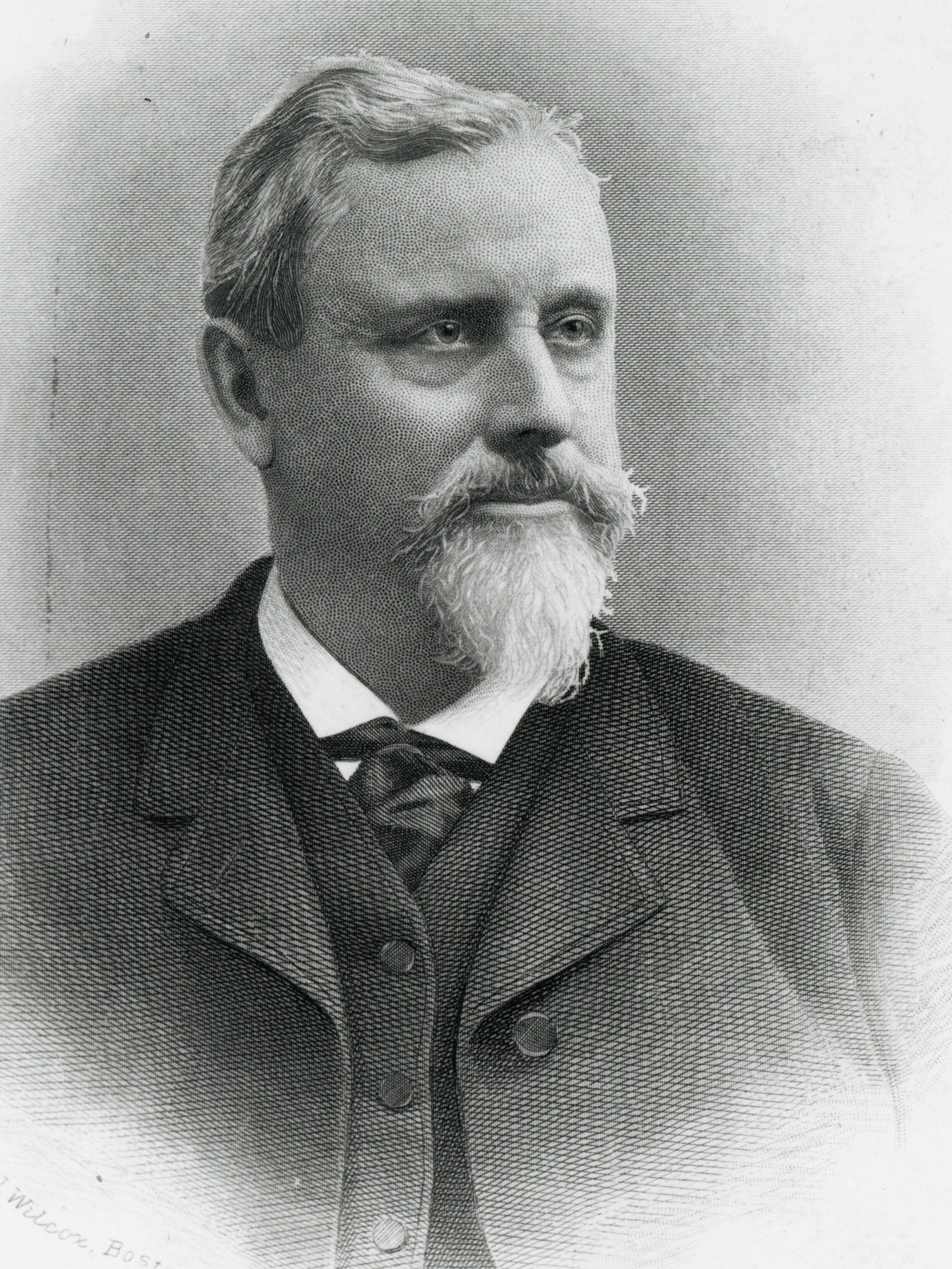

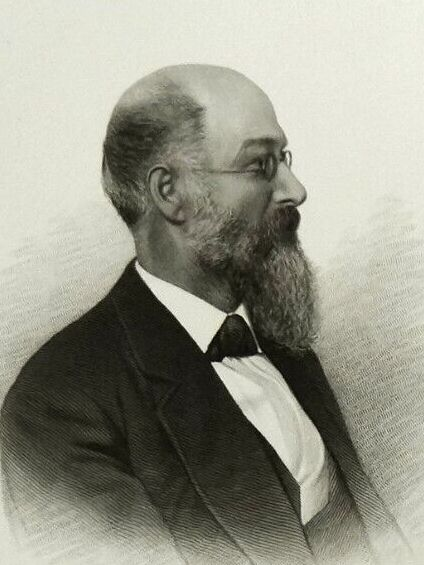
Candidate	Hugh O'Brien	John M. Clark
Party	Democratic	Republican
Popular vote	26,690	17,992
Percentage	59.73%	40.27%
Mayor before election
Hugh O'Brien
Democratic
Elected mayor
Hugh O'Brien
Democratic

The Boston mayoral election of 1885 saw the reelection of Hugh O'Brien.

== Results ==
1885 Boston mayoral election
Party	Candidate	Votes	%
Democratic	Hugh O'Brien (incumbent)	26,690	59.73%
Republican	John M. Clark	17,992	40.27%
Turnout		44,682	

== See also ==
- List of mayors of Boston, Massachusetts
