= 1899 Boston mayoral election =

Election in Massachusetts, United States

- December 12, 1899
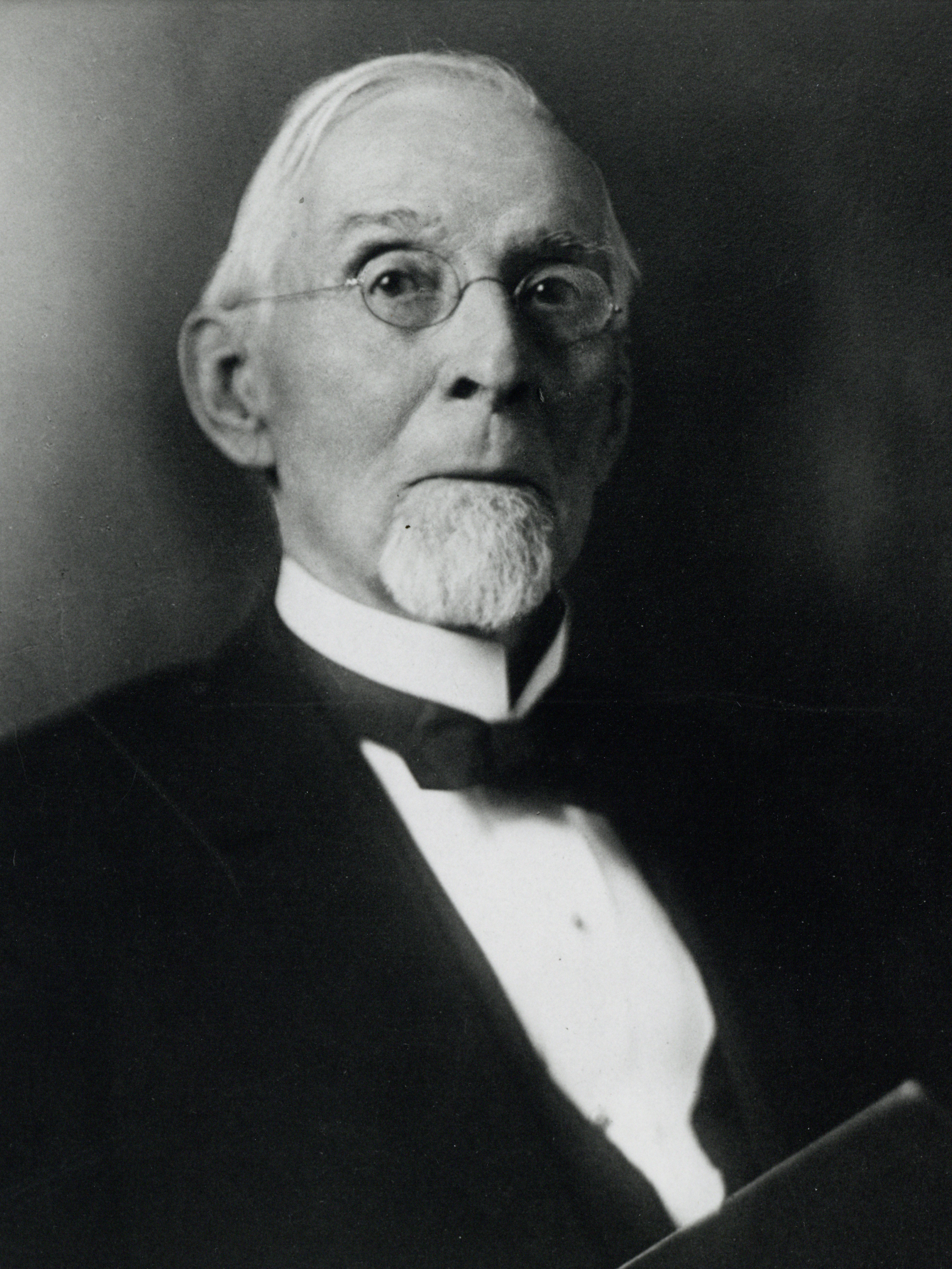

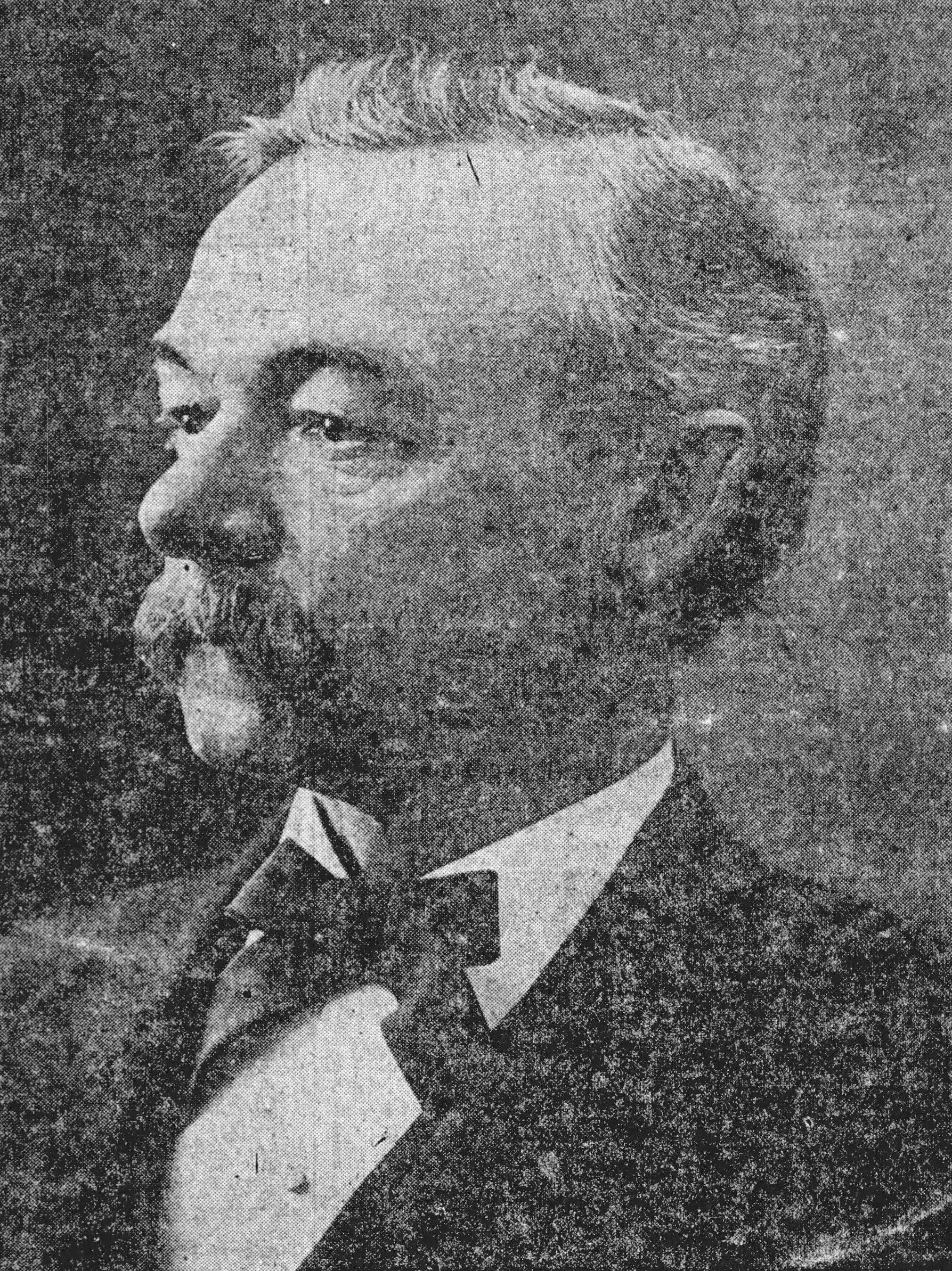
Candidate	Thomas N. Hart	Patrick Collins
Party	Republican	Democratic
Popular vote	40,838	38,557
Percentage	50.2%	47.4%
Mayor before election
Josiah Quincy
Democratic
Elected mayor
Thomas N. Hart
Republican

The Boston mayoral election of 1899 occurred on Tuesday, December 12, 1899. Republican candidate (and former mayor) Thomas N. Hart defeated Democratic nominee Patrick Collins and two other contenders, to become mayor for a second tenure. Incumbent mayor Josiah Quincy (a Democrat) had announced in July 1899 that he would not seek re-election.

Hart benefitted from strife within the Democratic party, where John R. Murphy had lost the nomination to Collins. Murphy subsequently announced his intent to cross party lines and vote for Hart. The votes of Murphy and his followers in support of the Republican candidate contributed to Collins' defeat, and was referred to as a "knifing" in contemporary news reports.

Hart was inaugurated on Monday, January 1, 1900.

== Party conventions ==
=== Democratic ===
The Democratic convention was held on November 20, 1899, at Bumstead Hall. Incumbent mayor Patrick Collins defeated former state senator and state representative John R. Murphy.

Democratic Mayoral Ballot
Candidates	Votes	%
Patrick Collins	187	64.26%
John R. Murphy	104	35.74%

=== Republican ===
The Republican convention was held on November 21, 1899, at Association Hall. Former Mayor Thomas N. Hart defeated former common councilor, alderman, and state representative Alpheus Sanford.

Republican Mayoral Ballot
Candidates	Votes	%
Thomas N. Hart	239	69.08%
Alpheus Sanford	107	30.92%

== General election ==
=== Candidates ===
- Patrick Collins (Democrat), former member of the United States House of Representatives (1883–1889), Massachusetts Senate (1870–1871), and Massachusetts House of Representatives (1868–1869)
- Thomas N. Hart (Republican), former Mayor of Boston (1889–1890), Postmaster of Boston (1891–1895), member of the Boston Board of Aldermen (1882–1886), and member of the Boston Common Council (1879–1881)
- John Weaver Sherman (Socialist)
- James F. Stevens (Socialist Labor)

=== Results ===
Candidates		General Election	
Candidates		Votes	%
R	Thomas N. Hart	40,838	50.2%
D	Patrick Collins	38,557	47.4%
SLP	James F. Stevens	978	1.2%
S	John Weaver Sherman	976	1.2%
all others		1	0.0%

== See also ==
- List of mayors of Boston, Massachusetts
