= Thomas N. Hart =

American manufacturer, businessman and politician (1829-1927)

Thomas Norton Hart
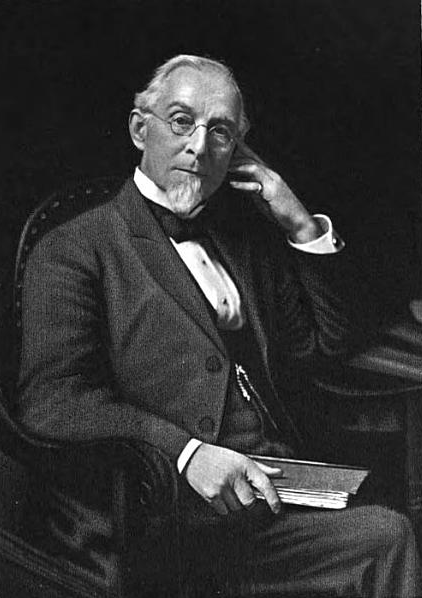

Mayor of Boston
- In office January 1, 1900 – January 6, 1902
- Preceded by: Josiah Quincy
- Succeeded by: Patrick A. Collins
- In office 1889–1890
- Preceded by: Hugh O'Brien
- Succeeded by: Nathan Matthews Jr.

Postmaster of Boston
- In office 1891–1895

Member of the Boston Board of Aldermen
- In office 1882–1886

Member of the Boston Common Council
- In office 1879–1881

Personal details
- Born: January 20, 1829 North Reading, Massachusetts, U.S.
- Died: October 4, 1927 (aged 98) Galloupes Point - Swampscott, Massachusetts, U.S.
- Party: Republican
- Spouse(s): Elizabeth Snow, m. April 30, 1850.

Thomas Norton Hart (January 20, 1829 – October 4, 1927) was an American manufacturer, businessman, and politician from Massachusetts who served as mayor of Boston from 1889 to 1890 and from 1900 to 1902.

== Early life and career ==
Thomas Norton Hart was born in North Reading, Massachusetts on January 20, 1829, coming to Boston when he was young and penniless, in hope of becoming wealthy. He eventually became president of the Mount Vernon National Bank.

=== Political career ===
Hart became a member of the Boston Common Council in 1879 and held that position until 1881, when he was elected to the Boston Board of Aldermen. He was known for his opposition to granting a franchise to the Bay State Gas Company "to enter the streets of Boston for the sole purpose of making money". He held this position from 1882 until he ran for mayor of Boston in the 1886 election.

== Elections ==
Hart lost his bid to become mayor in the 1886 Boston mayoral election to the Irish Catholic Democrat, and incumbent mayor, Hugh O'Brien, by 4,740 votes. He ran against O'Brien again in 1887, this time losing by a slimmer margin of 1,457 votes.

In 1888, in his third attempt to become mayor of Boston, Hart was successful against O'Brien, winning by a margin of 1,876 votes. He was reelected in 1889, defeating District Attorney Owen A. Galvin by a margin of 5,460 votes.

In the 1890 election Hart was defeated in the Republican primaries by Moody Merrill. He remained an active figure in Boston politics, running for mayor and being defeated by the incumbent, Nathan Matthews Jr., in 1893 by a margin of 5,099. He ran once again in 1899, this time defeating former U.S. Representative Patrick Collins by 1,904 votes. His campaign was greatly aided when Collins' opponent in the Democratic primary, John R. Murphy, announced he would cross party lines and vote for Hart instead of Collins.

Hart saw his last defeat in 1901, with Collins prevailing in a landslide, having 18,839 more votes.

== Mayoralty ==
As mayor, Hart was strict and sought systemization. He opposed reforms within the Boston City Council and was against increased funding for projects unrelated to infrastructure. He fought what he saw as excessive spending for the maintenance of parks. He supported the erection of a subway, although through state or federal funds rather than local ones.

== Death ==
Hart died on October 4, 1927, at the age of 98, in Swampscott, Massachusetts.

At 98, he is the longest-lived mayor of Boston.

== See also ==
- Timeline of Boston, 1880s-1900s
- 1886 Boston mayoral election
- 1887 Boston mayoral election
- 1888 Boston mayoral election
- 1889 Boston mayoral election
- 1893 Boston mayoral election
- 1893 Boston mayoral election
- 1899 Boston mayoral election
- 1901 Boston mayoral election

Political offices
Preceded by Hugh O'Brien	32nd Mayor of Boston, Massachusetts; 1889–1890	Succeeded by Nathan Matthews Jr.
Preceded by Josiah Quincy	36th Mayor of Boston, Massachusetts; 1900–1902	Succeeded by Patrick Collins
