= 1886 Boston mayoral election =

Election in Massachusetts, United States

- December 14, 1886
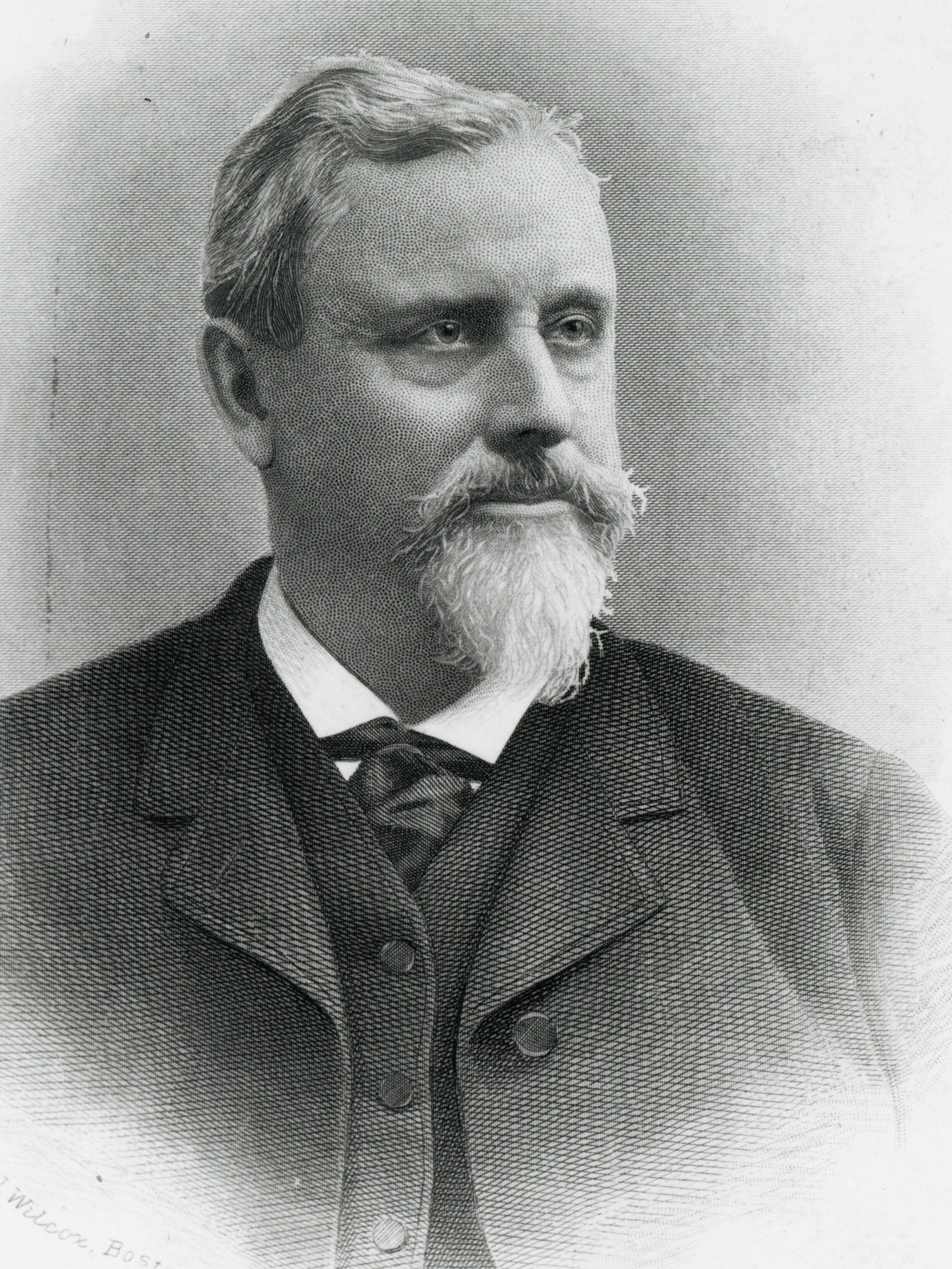

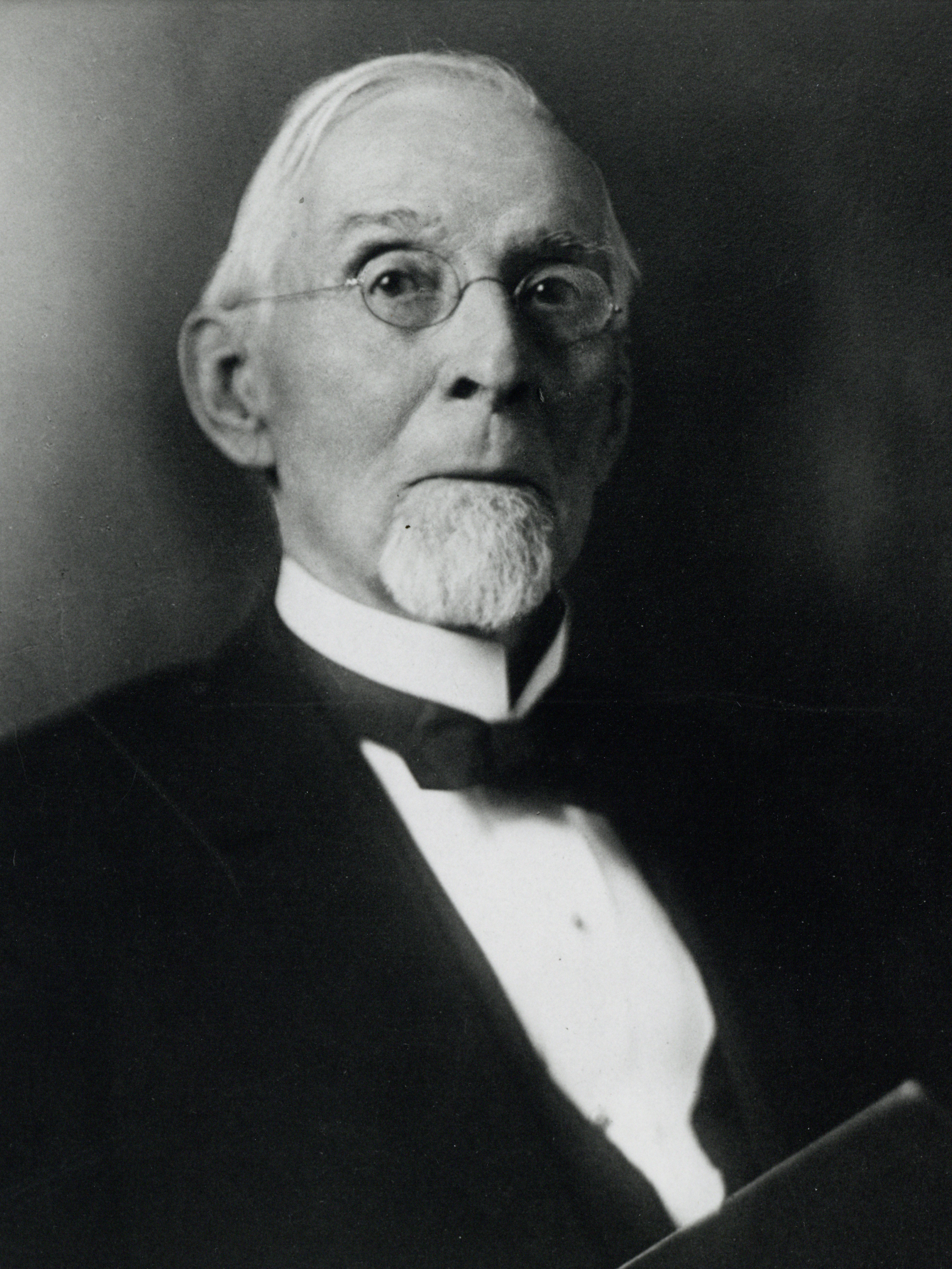

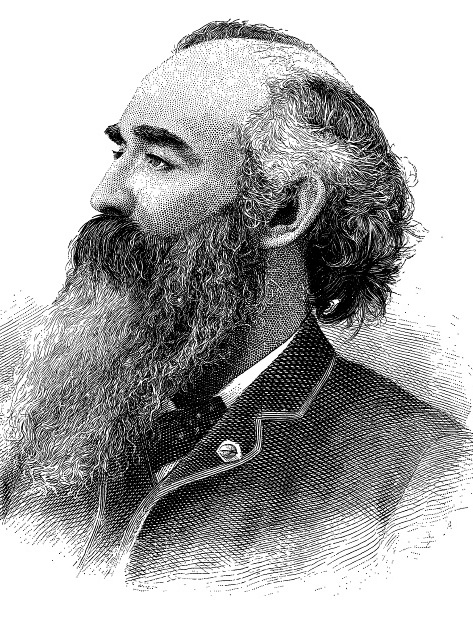
Candidate	Hugh O'Brien	Thomas N. Hart	George E. McNeill
Party	Democratic	Republican	Labor
Popular vote	23,426	18,686	3,555
Percentage	51.30%	40.92%	7.79%
Mayor before election
Hugh O'Brien
Democratic
Elected mayor
Hugh O'Brien
Democratic

The Boston mayoral election of 1886 saw the reelection of Hugh O'Brien to a third consecutive term.

== Results ==
1886 Boston mayoral election
Party	Candidate	Votes	%
Democratic	Hugh O'Brien (incumbent)	23,426	51.30%
Republican	Thomas N. Hart	18,686	40.92%
Labor	George E. McNeill	3,555	7.79%
Turnout		45,667	

== See also ==
- List of mayors of Boston, Massachusetts
