= 1884 Boston mayoral election =

Election in Massachusetts, United States

- December 9, 1884
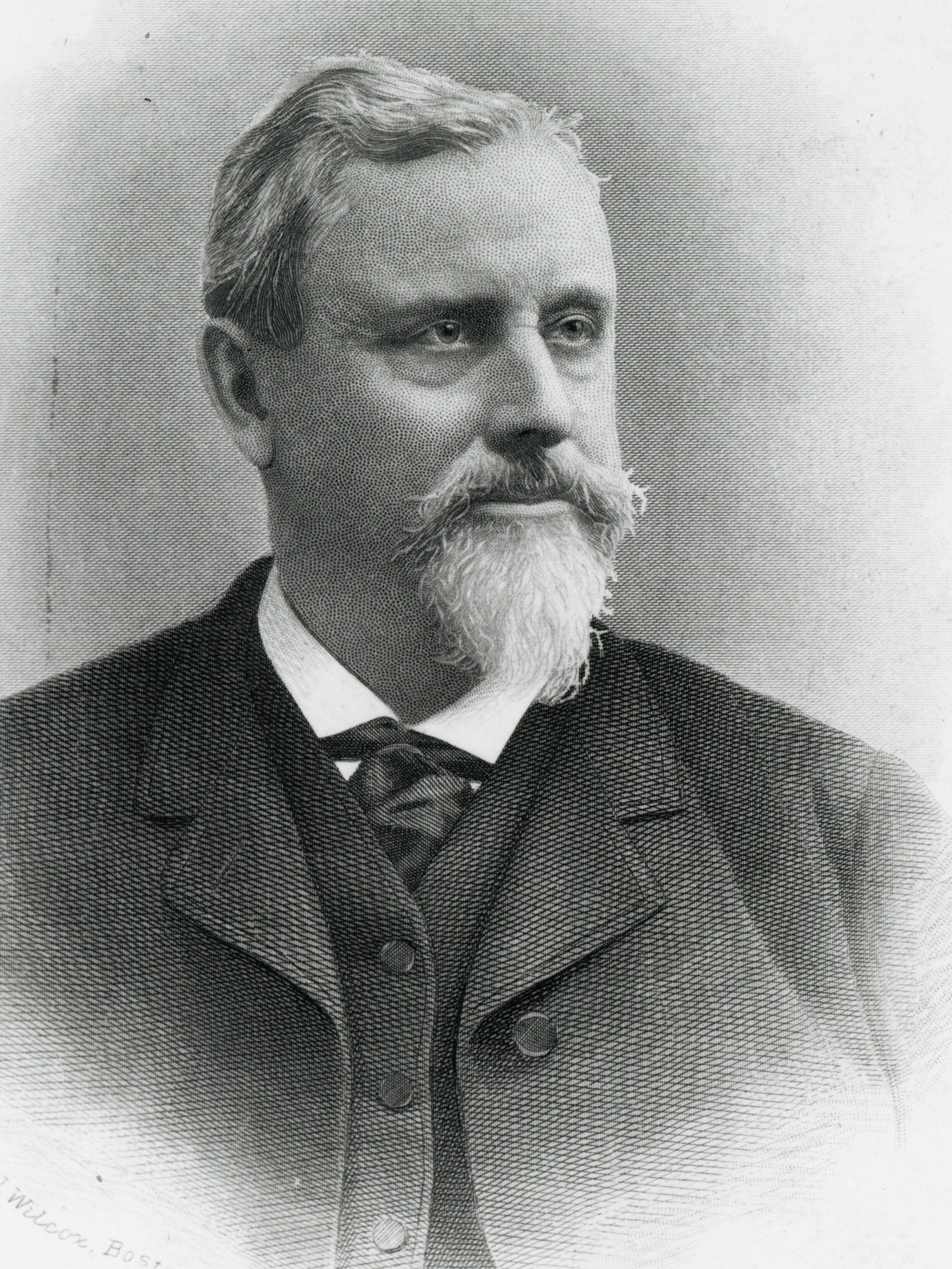

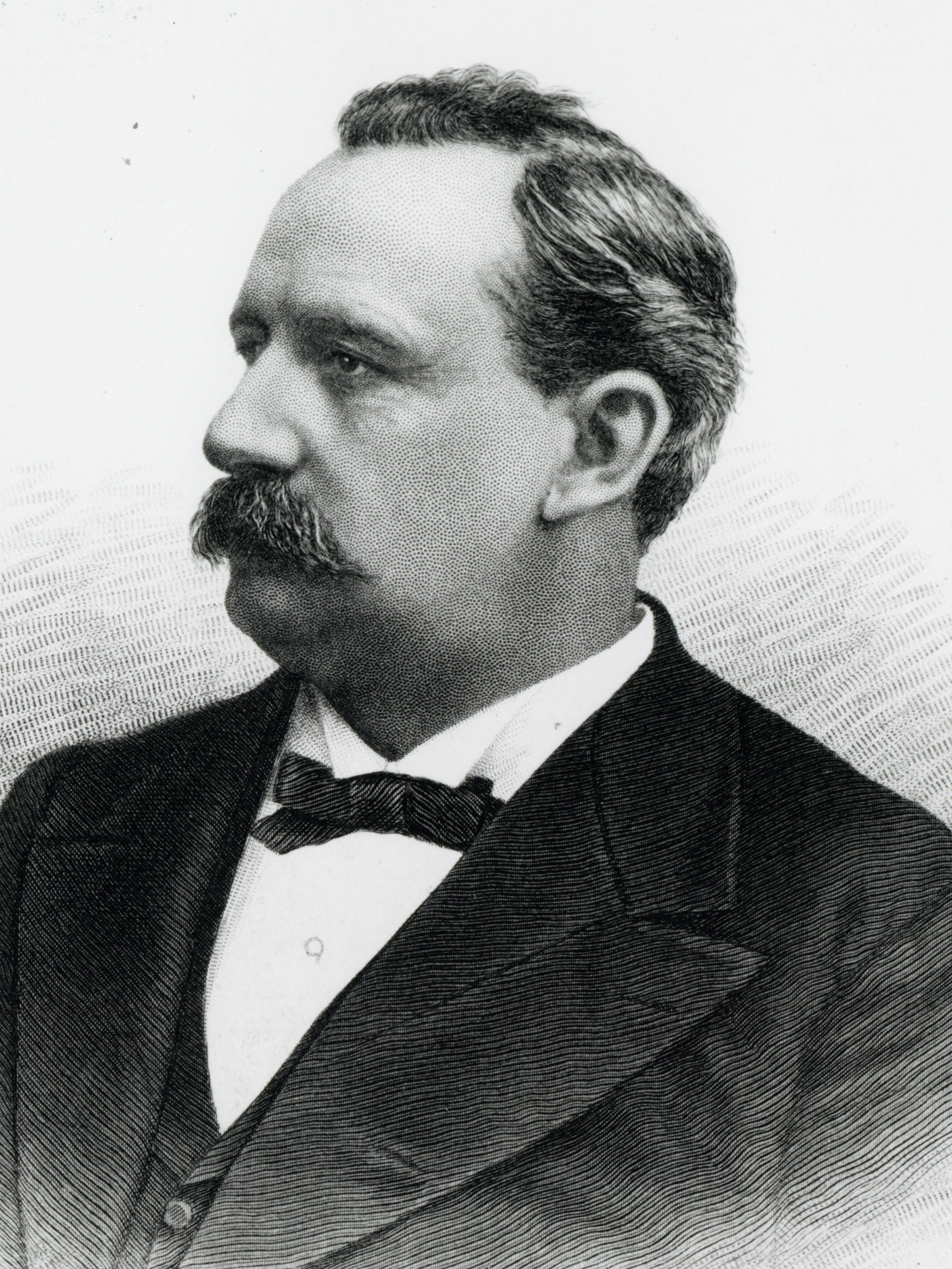
Candidate	Hugh O'Brien	Augustus Pearl Martin
Party	Democratic	Republican
Popular vote	27,494	24,168
Percentage	53.22%	46.78%
Mayor before election
Augustus Pearl Martin
Republican
Elected mayor
Hugh O'Brien
Democratic

The Boston mayoral election of 1884 saw the election of Hugh O'Brien, who unseated incumbent mayor Augustus Pearl Martin.

O'Brien's victory began an era in which Irish descended men dominated the mayoralty of Boston.

== Results ==
1884 Boston mayoral election
Party	Candidate	Votes	%
Democratic	Hugh O'Brien	27,494	53.22%
Republican	Augustus Pearl Martin (incumbent)	24,168	46.78%
Turnout		51,662	

== See also ==
- List of mayors of Boston, Massachusetts
