= 1887 Boston mayoral election =

Election in Massachusetts, United States

- December 13, 1887
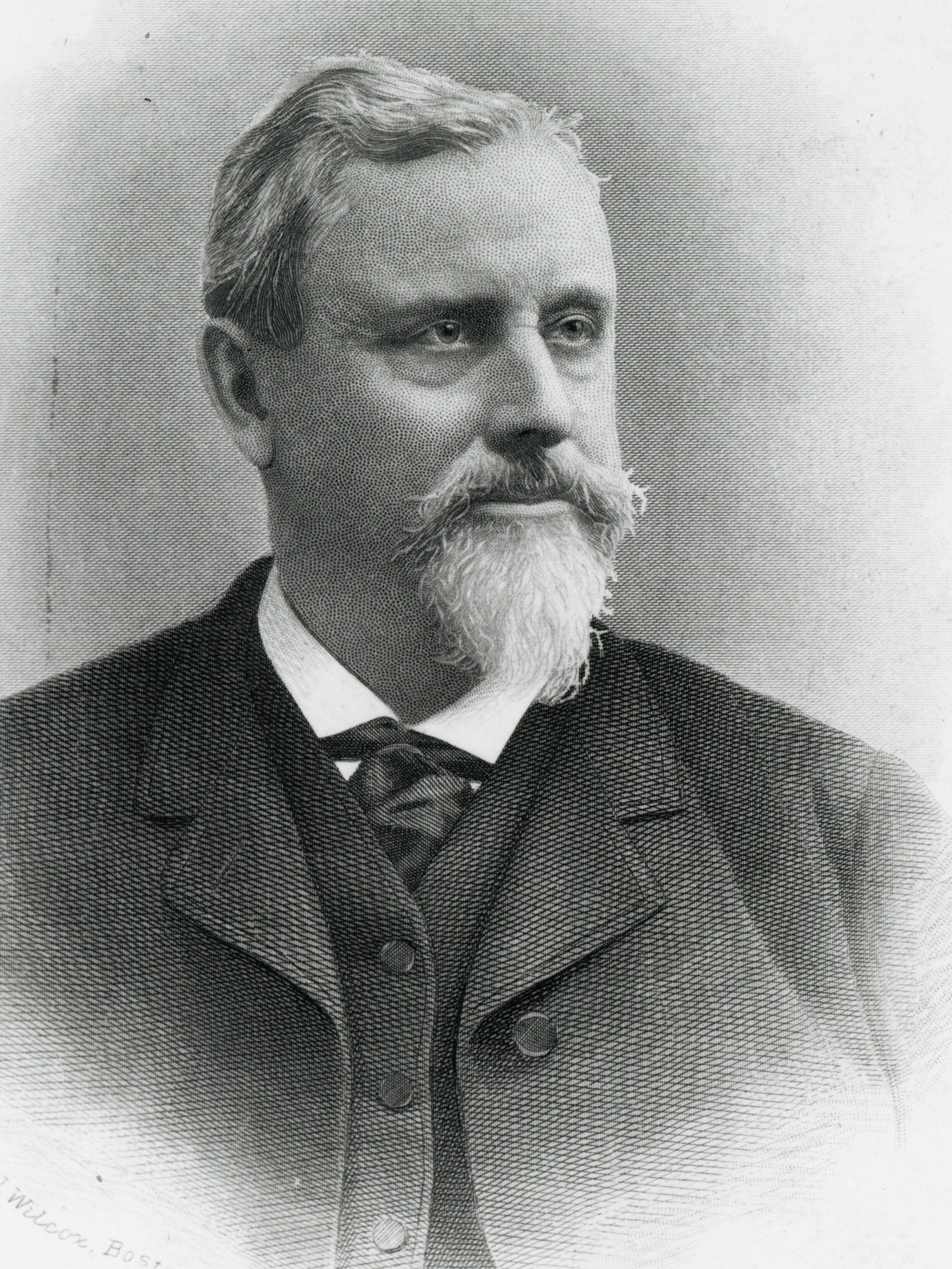

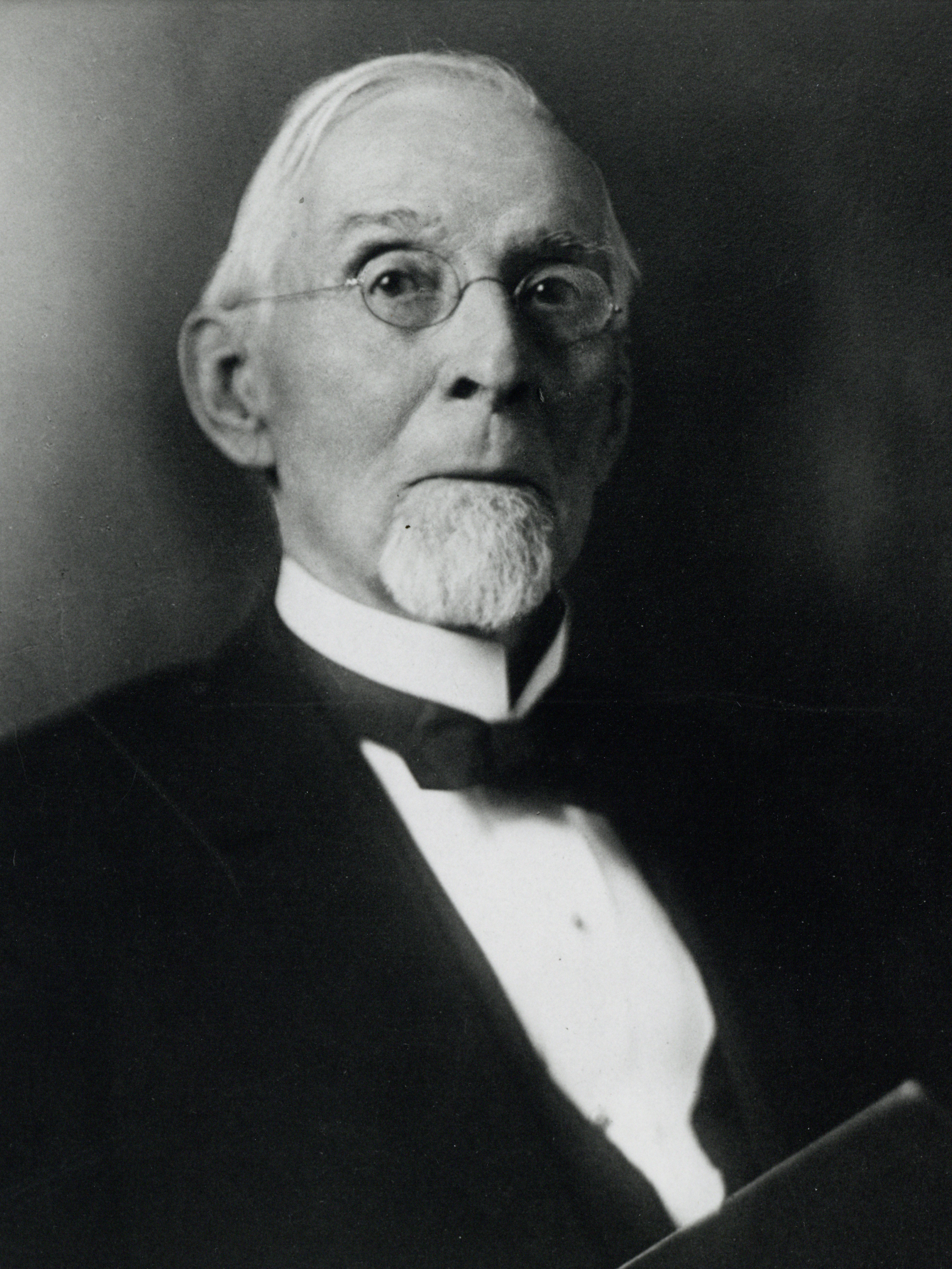
Candidate	Hugh O'Brien	Thomas N. Hart
Party	Democratic	Republican
Popular vote	26,636	25,179
Percentage	51.41%	48.59%
Mayor before election
Hugh O'Brien
Democratic
Elected mayor
Hugh O'Brien
Democratic

The Boston mayoral election of 1887 saw the reelection of Hugh O'Brien (a Democrat to a fourth consecutive term, defeating Republican nominee Thomas N. Hart.

== Nominations ==
Incumbent mayor Hugh O'Brien was renominated by the Democratic Party. Thomas N. Hart was nominated by the Republican Party, and was also included on an independent ticket.

== Results ==
1887 Boston mayoral election
Party	Candidate	Votes	%
Democratic	Hugh O'Brien (incumbent)	26,636	51.41
Republican	Thomas N. Hart	25,179	48.59
Turnout		51,815	

== See also ==
- List of mayors of Boston, Massachusetts
