= Daniel A. Whelton =

American politician (1872-1953)

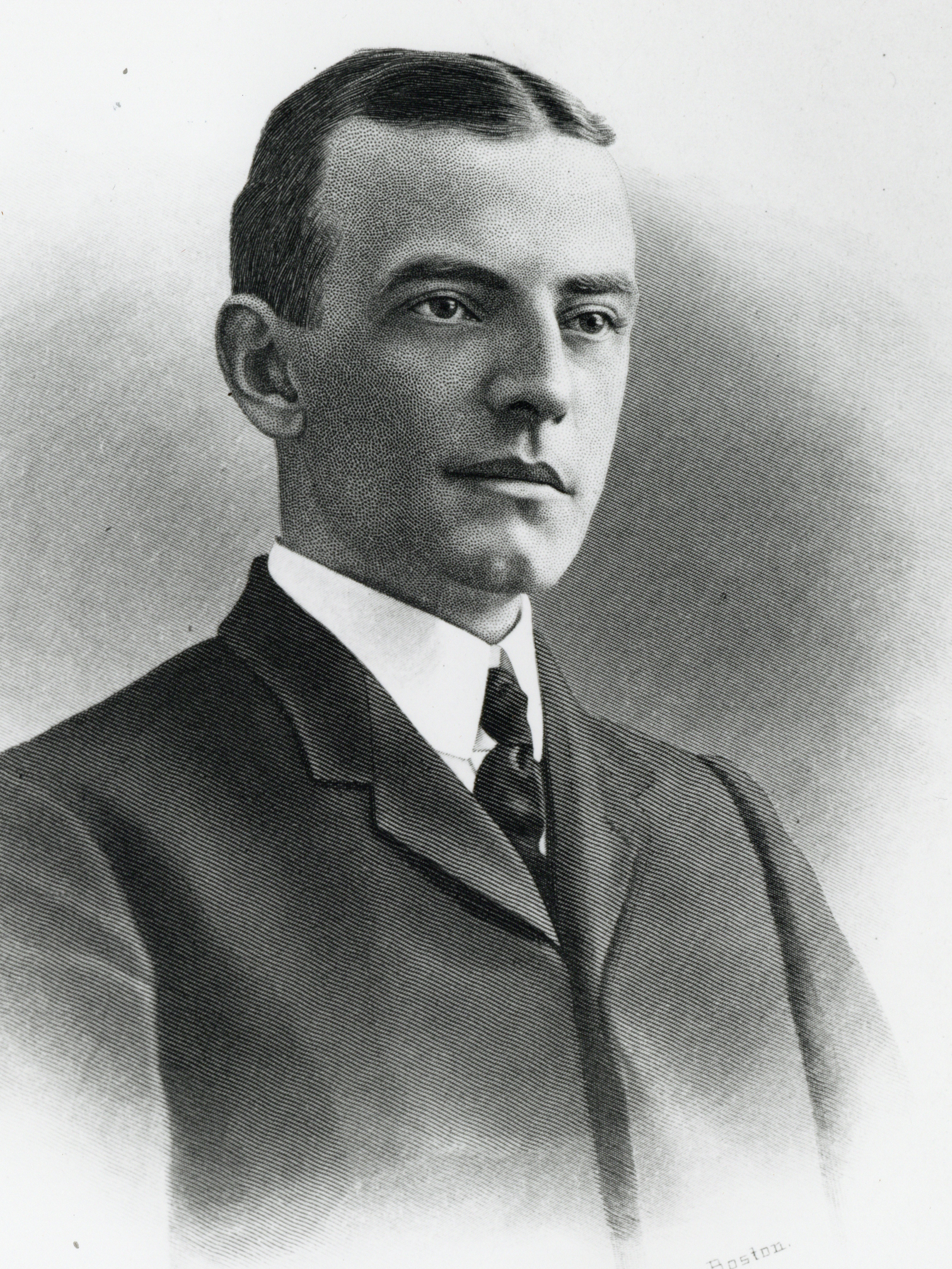

Acting Mayor of Boston
- In office September 15, 1905 – January 1, 1906
- Preceded by: Patrick Collins
- Succeeded by: John F. Fitzgerald

Chairman of the Boston Board of Aldermen
- In office 1905
- Preceded by: James Henry Doyle
- Succeeded by: Charles Martin Draper

Member of the Boston Board of Aldermen
- In office 1905–1908

Member of the Boston Common Council
- In office 1894–1995

Personal details
- Born: January 21, 1872 Boston, Massachusetts, U.S.
- Died: November 27, 1953 (aged 81) Boston, Massachusetts, U.S.
- Party: Democratic
- Spouse: Ellen Frances Catherine Caffrey
- Children: Francis Russell, Frederick S., Daniel Edwin, Anna, William A, Robert
- Education: St. Marys School, 1886
- Occupation: Sheriff, Alderman

Daniel Aloysius Whelton (January 21, 1872 – November 27, 1953) was an American politician who served as the acting mayor of Boston.

== Education ==
Born in Boston to Irish (County Cork) natives Daniel and Ann Curry Whelton, he lived in Boston's West End at 69 Billerica Street. When he was five years old, Whelton's father died and he was raised by his mother, who worked as a pastry cook for the admiral commanding the Charlestown Navy Yard. Whelton received his education at St. Mary's School, graduating in 1886. After Whelton graduated from St. Mary's, Whelton attended the Evening High School for a few months.

== Politics ==
It was while he lived in the West End that Whelton became an associate of Ward 8 Democratic boss Martin Lomasney. Whelton became a member of Lomasney's Hendricks Club in the West End, where he began his political career by registering new voters.

Whelton served on the Boston Common Council in 1894 and 1895, where he served on the Finance Committee. From 1905 until 1908, he served on the Boston Board of Aldermen. In 1905 he was chairman of the board.

== Acting mayor ==
Whelton was the chairman of the Boston Board of Aldermen in 1905. During the long illness of Mayor Patrick Collins, Whelton served as acting mayor. Following the death of Collins, Whelton, aged 33, was formally sworn in as acting mayor of Boston, a position he held from September 15, 1905 to January 1, 1906. Whelton was the first native-born Irish-Catholic mayor of Boston and remains the youngest person to hold that political office.

== Personal life ==
Though a rival of John F. Fitzgerald, Whelton was lifelong friends with P. J. Kennedy, paternal grandfather of President John F. Kennedy, and served as a pallbearer at Patrick Kennedy's funeral. Whelton was also a friend and associate of Boston mayor James M. Curley. According to The Boston Globe of December 1, 1953, Curley and another former Boston mayor, John Hynes, were pallbearers at Whelton's funeral, which was held at Holy Cross Cathedral.

== See also ==
- Timeline of Boston, 1900s

Political offices
| Preceded by Patrick Collins | Mayor of Boston, Massachusetts (acting); 1905–1906 | Succeeded by John F. Fitzgerald |
