= 1841 Boston mayoral election =

Election in Massachusetts, United States

- December 13, 1841
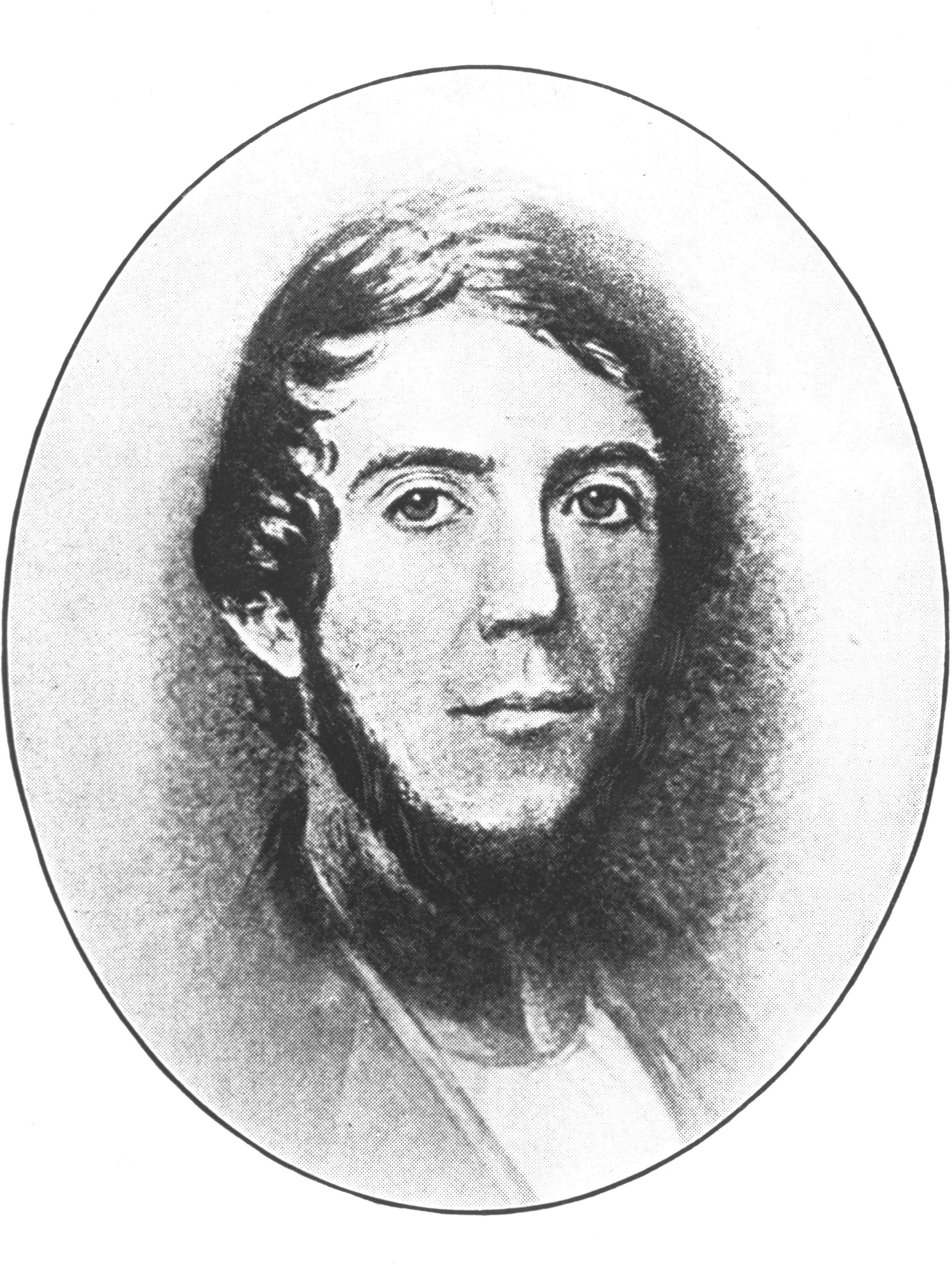

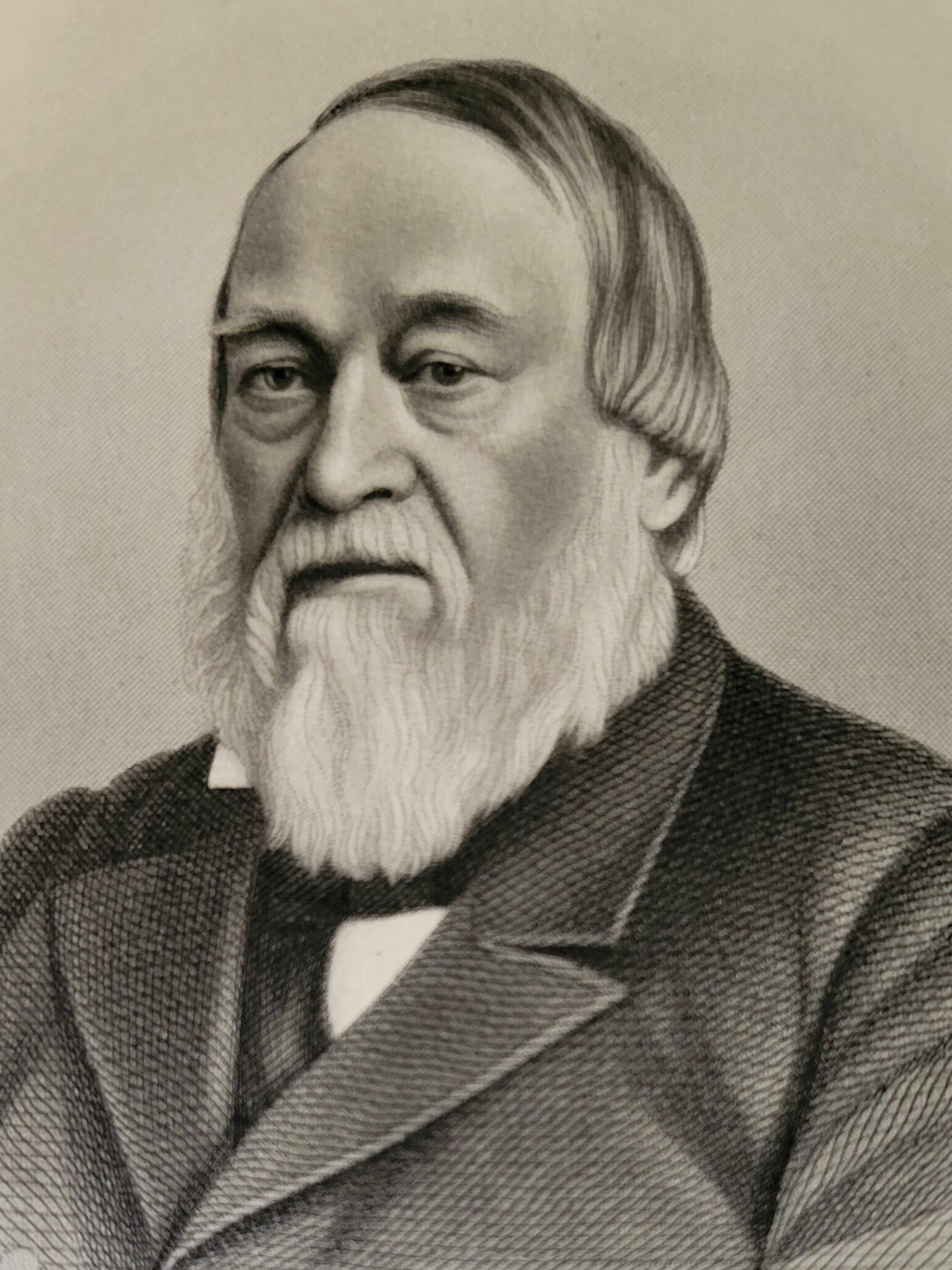
Candidate	Jonathan Chapman	Nathaniel Greene
Party	Whig	Democratic
Popular vote	4,698	3,545
Percentage	52.00%	39.24%
Mayor before election
Jonathan Chapman
Whig
Elected mayor
Jonathan Chapman
Whig

The 1841 Boston mayoral election saw the reelection of Whig Party incumbent Jonathan Chapman to a third consecutive term. It was held on December 13, 1841.

== Candidates ==
Chapman was renominated by the Whig Party. Nathaniel Greene was the Democratic Party nominee.

== Results ==
1841 Boston mayoral election
Party	Candidate	Votes	%
Whig	Jonathan Chapman (incumbent)	4,698	52.00
Democratic	Nathaniel Greene	3,545	39.24
Scattering	Other	791	8.76
Total votes		9,034	100

== See also ==
- List of mayors of Boston, Massachusetts
