= Patrick Collins (politician) =

American politician (1844-1905)

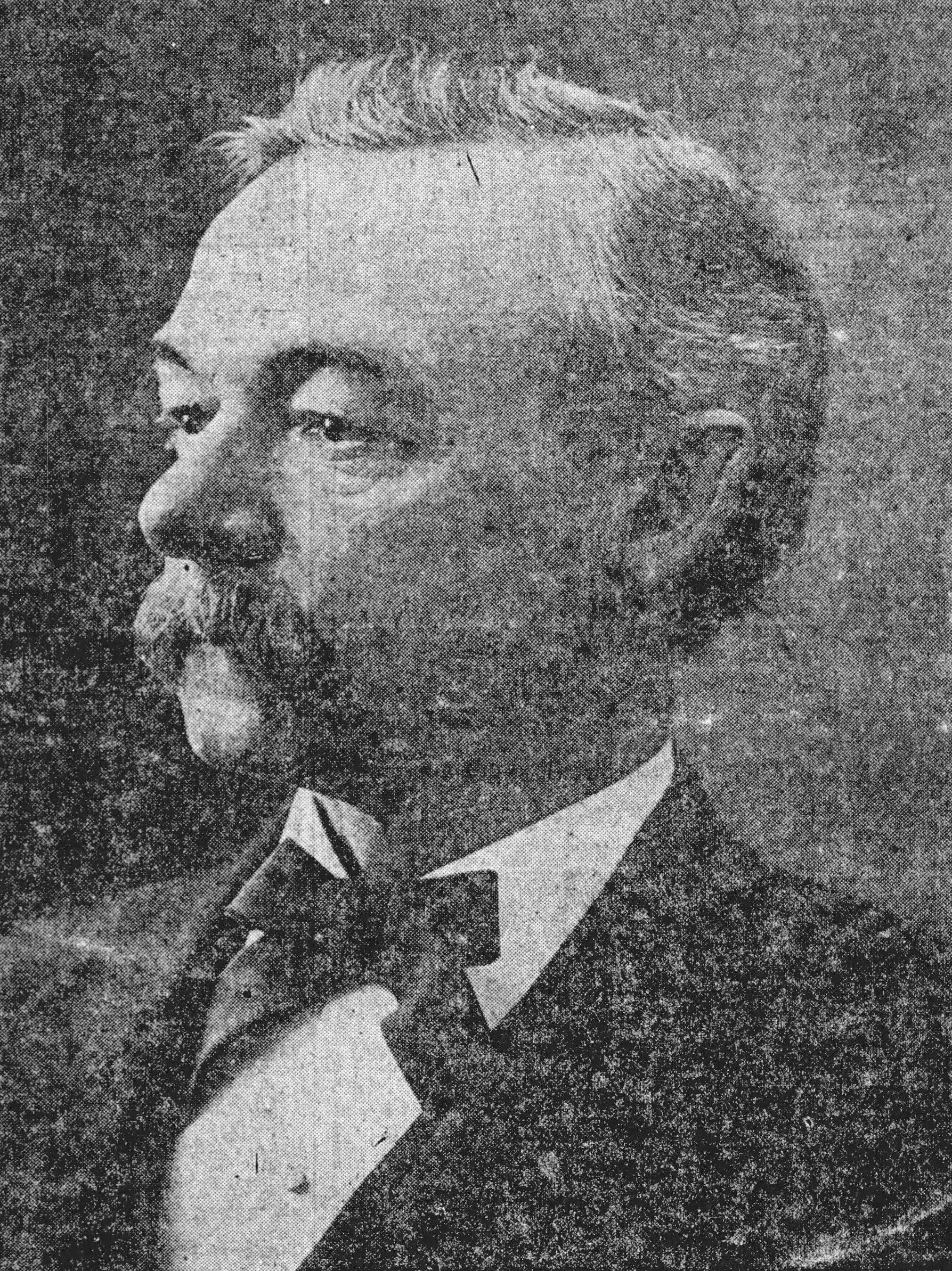

Mayor of Boston
- In office January 6, 1902 – September 13, 1905
- Preceded by: Thomas N. Hart
- Succeeded by: Daniel A. Whelton (acting)

Member of the U.S. House of Representatives from Massachusetts's 4th district
- In office March 4, 1883 – March 3, 1889
- Preceded by: Leopold Morse
- Succeeded by: Joseph H. O'Neil

Member of the Massachusetts Senate
- In office 1870–1871

Member of the Massachusetts House of Representatives
- In office 1868–1869

Personal details
- Born: Patrick Andrew Collins; March 12, 1844 Fermoy, County Cork, Ireland
- Died: September 13, 1905 (aged 61) Hot Springs, Virginia, U.S.
- Party: Democratic
- Spouse: Mary E. (Carey) Collins
- Children: 2 daughters, 1 son
- Education: Harvard Law School
- Profession: lawyer

Patrick Andrew Collins (March 12, 1844 – September 13, 1905) was an American politician lawyer who served as mayor of Boston and as a U.S. representative from Massachusetts.

== Biography ==
=== Early life ===
Collins was born March 12, 1844, near Fermoy, County Cork, Ireland. His family emigrated to the United States and settled in Chelsea, Massachusetts, in 1848 after the death of his father.

Collins attended public schools until the age of 12. He then worked at various trades in Massachusetts and Ohio. At age 15, he returned to Boston and learned the upholstery trade. Working in an upholstery shop, he rose to position of foreman and became active in the trade union movement. He became a secretary of his union and a delegate to the Trades Assembly.

Interested in a career in law, Collins saved his money and became active in politics.

=== Public service ===
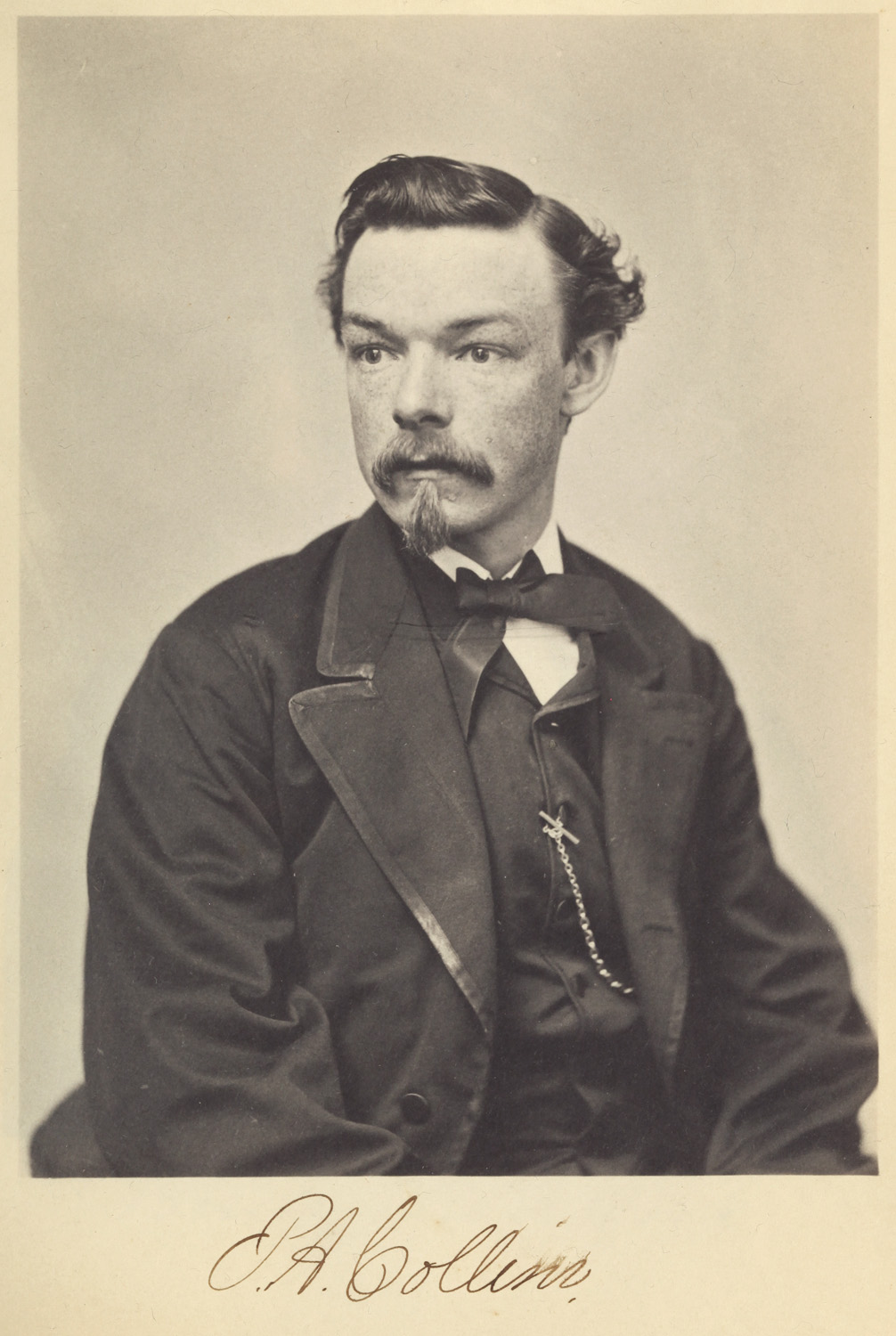
Collins in 1868, as a member of the Massachusetts House of Representatives

In 1867, Collins was nominated for a seat in the Massachusetts House of Representatives. Shortly afterward, he started working for a law firm. He was elected to the House, serving two terms in 1868 and 1869. He then served two terms in the Massachusetts Senate in 1870 and 1871. During his time in the state legislature, he studied law at Harvard Law School. He graduated and was admitted to the bar in 1871. Included in Collins' graduating class at Harvard was Charles Frederic Adams, a lecturer and political reformer who politically supported the "Single Tax' economic theory of Henry George.

Collins practiced law in Boston. He served as judge advocate general of Massachusetts in 1875. He also served as delegate to the Democratic National Conventions in 1876, 1880, 1888, and 1892. He lived on Percival Street in Meeting House Hill in Dorchester.

Collins was elected to the U.S. Congress in 1882 and served three terms in the 48th, 49th and 50th Congresses from 1883 to 1889. He was also Chairman of the Democratic State Committee from 1884 to 1890. He retired from Congress in 1889 and resumed his law practice. He also served on the boards of directors of several companies and civic organizations. Collins served as consul general in London under President Grover Cleveland from May 6, 1893, to May 17, 1897.

Collins was the Democratic candidate for Mayor of Boston three times. In December 1899, he lost to Republican incumbent Thomas N. Hart (40,838 votes to 38,557 votes). The two candidates had a rematch in the December 1901 election, this time with Collins prevailing (52,035–33,196) to win his first term as mayor. Collins was re-elected in December 1903, defeating Republican challenger George N. Swallow (48,745–22,369).

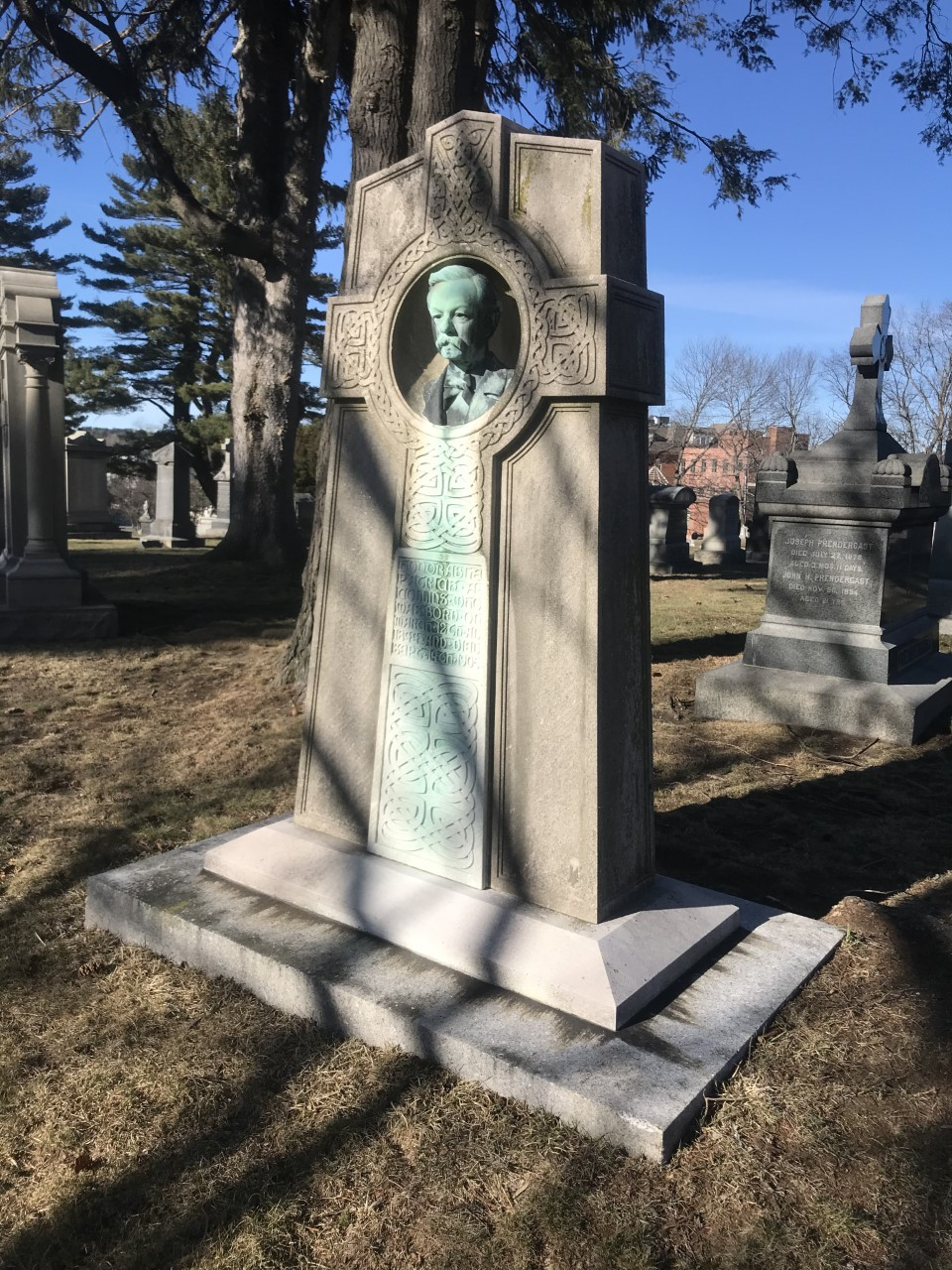
The Patrick A. Collins Memorial by Cyrus E. Dallin

Collins served as mayor from January 1902 until his death. He died during an official visit to Hot Springs, Virginia, on September 13, 1905. He was interred in Holyhood Cemetery in Brookline, Massachusetts. His memorial includes a bronze portrait sculpture by renowned sculptor Cyrus Dallin who also designed the cross made from Tennessee marble.

== See also ==
- 1868 Massachusetts legislature
- 1870 Massachusetts legislature
- 1871 Massachusetts legislature
- Timeline of Boston, 1880s-1900s

U.S. House of Representatives
Preceded by Leopold Morse	Member of the U.S. House of Representatives from Massachusetts's 4th congressional district March 4, 1883 – March 3, 1889	Succeeded by Edward D. Hayden
Political offices
Preceded by Thomas N. Hart	Mayor of Boston, Massachusetts; 1902–1905	Succeeded by Daniel A. Whelton
