= Hugh O'Brien =

American politician (1827–1895)

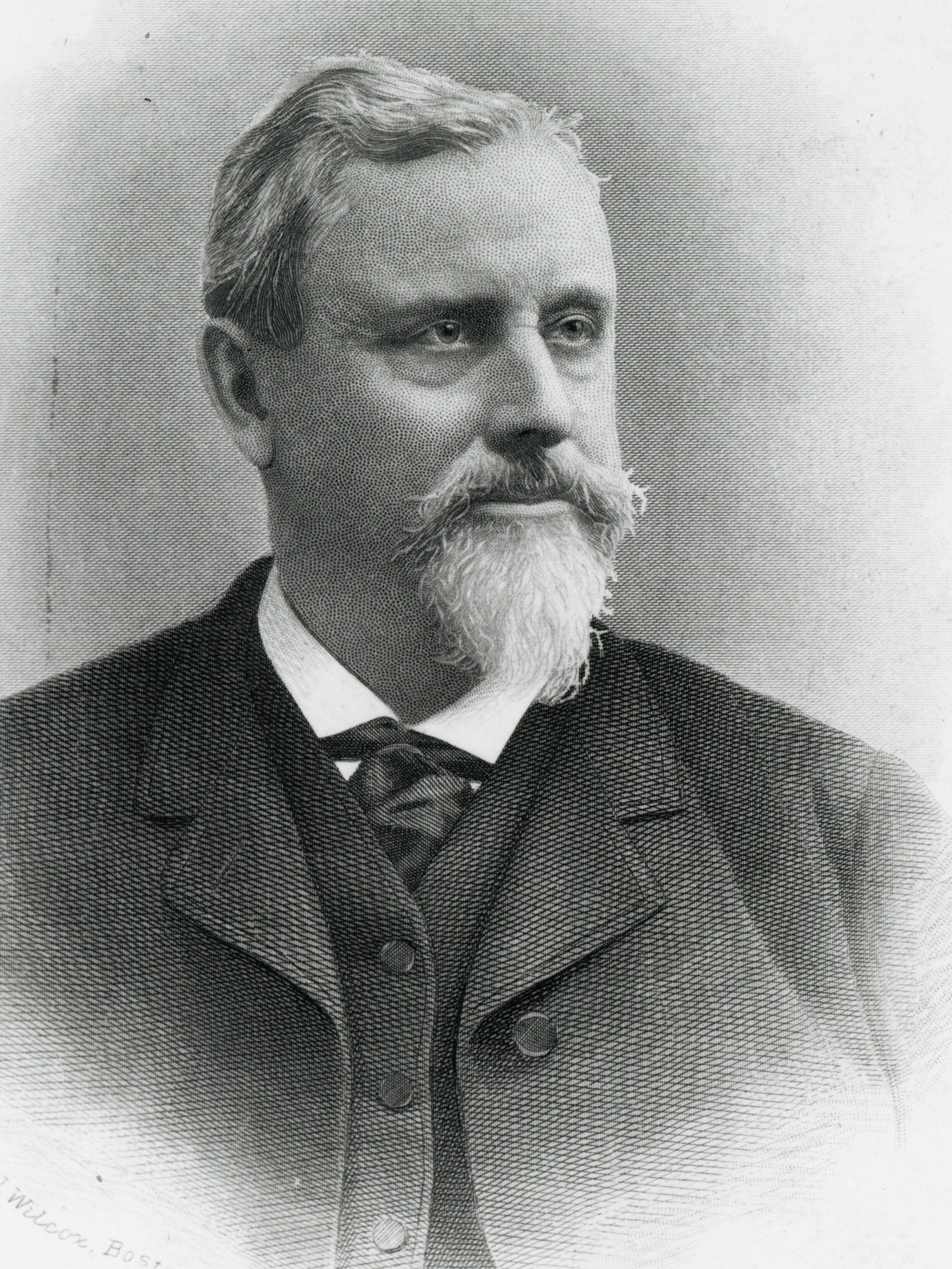

Mayor of Boston
- In office January 5, 1885 – January 7, 1889
- Preceded by: Augustus Pearl Martin
- Succeeded by: Thomas N. Hart

Chairman of the Boston Board of Aldermen
- In office 1883
- Preceded by: Solomon B. Stebbins
- Succeeded by: Charles Varney Whitten
- In office 1879–1881
- Preceded by: Solomon B. Stebbins
- Succeeded by: Solomon B. Stebbins

Member of the Boston Board of Aldermen
- In office 1875–1883

Personal details
- Born: July 13, 1827 Ireland
- Died: August 1, 1895 (aged 68) Massachusetts, U.S.
- Party: Democratic

Hugh O'Brien (July 13, 1827 – August 1, 1895) served as the mayor of Boston from 1884 to 1888. O'Brien is notable as Boston's first Irish and Catholic mayor, having emigrated from Ireland to America in the early 1830s. O'Brien was the editor of the Shipping and Commercial List and served as a Boston alderman from 1875 to 1883. He was chairman of the Boston Board of Aldermen from 1879 through 1881 and again in 1883.

== Early life ==
Born in Ireland on July 13, 1827, O'Brien emigrated to America in the early 1830s as a young child. He dropped out of public school at the age of twelve to pursue a career in newspapers, eventually becoming the editor of the Shipping and Commercial List.

== Early political career ==
O'Brien began his political career in 1875 after being elected to the Boston Board of Aldermen.

During his time as alderman, he was known for his advocacy toward public parks, having a hand in the city's acquisition of Franklin Park and the Back Bay land. He was a champion of the working class and helped pass legislation regulating the pay of men under city contractors. He also sought to decrease expenditures within the city, in order to lower taxes.

== Mayoralty ==
After having lost the 1883 Boston mayoral election to Republican Augustus Pearl Martin by 1,544 votes, O'Brien defeated Martin in a 1884 rematch by a margin of 3,326 votes. He was the first Irishman to become mayor of Boston.

O'Brien enacted numerous reforms and focused on controlling their subsequent expenses. He won reelection in 1885, 1886, and 1887, before being defeated by three-time challenger Republican Thomas N. Hart in the election of 1888.

== Personal life ==
O'Brien was the father of Rev. James J. O'Brien, a priest of the Archdiocese of Boston who died in 1926.

== Later life and death ==
O'Brien was appointed by Mayor Nathan Matthews Jr. to Boston's Board of Survey, which was tasked with planning the city's streets.

He died on August 1, 1895, at the age of 68.

== See also ==
- Timeline of Boston, 1880s
- 1883 Boston mayoral election
- 1884 Boston mayoral election
- 1885 Boston mayoral election
- 1886 Boston mayoral election
- 1887 Boston mayoral election
- 1888 Boston mayoral election

Political offices
Preceded by Augustus Martin	31st Mayor of Boston, Massachusetts; January 5, 1885 – January 7, 1889	Succeeded by Thomas N. Hart
