= 1853–54 Boston mayoral election =

Election in Massachusetts, United States

1853–1854 Boston mayoral election
- Dec. 12, 1853 (1st vote); Dec. 27, 1853 (2nd vote); Jan. 9, 1854 (3rd vote)
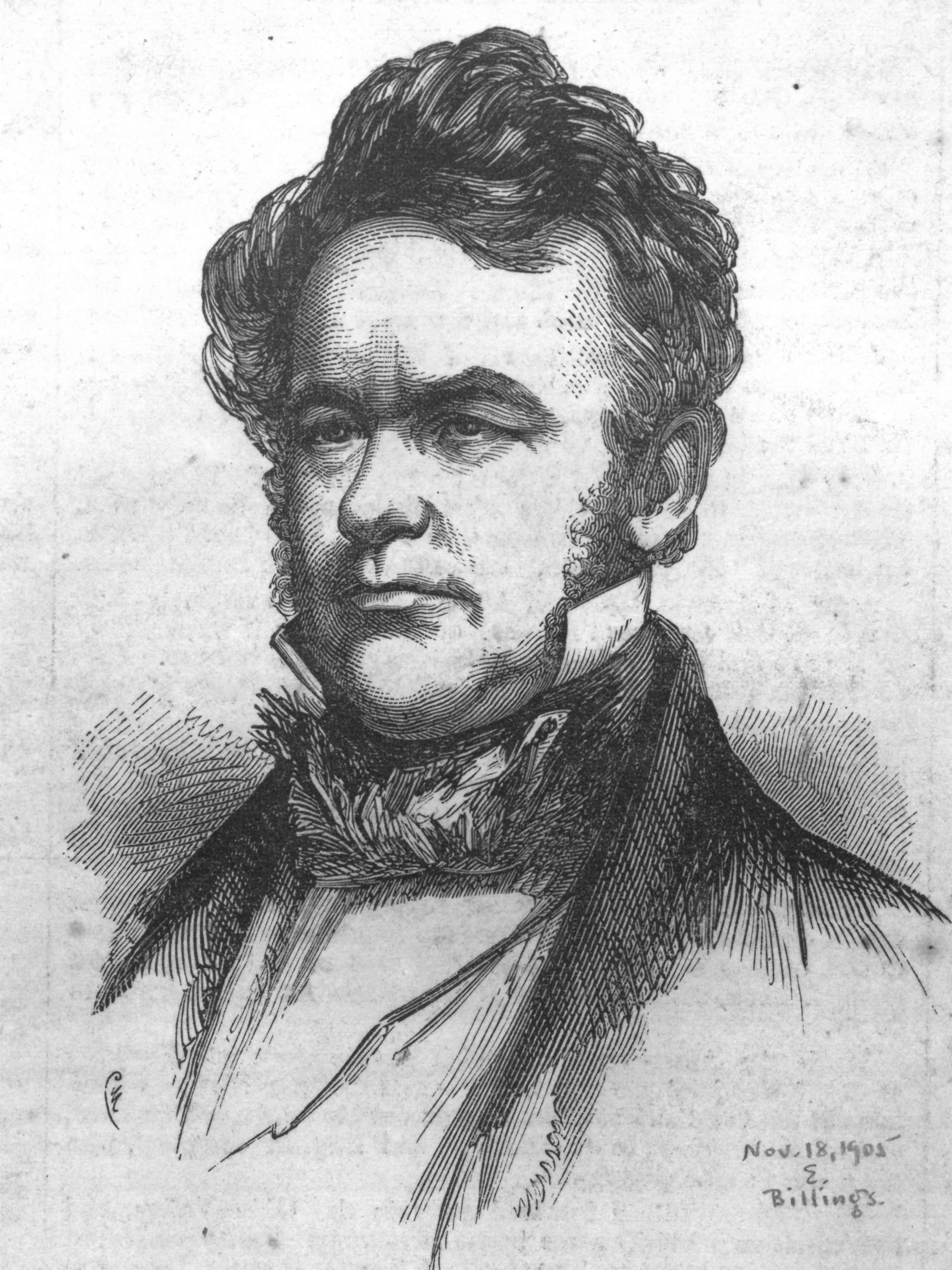

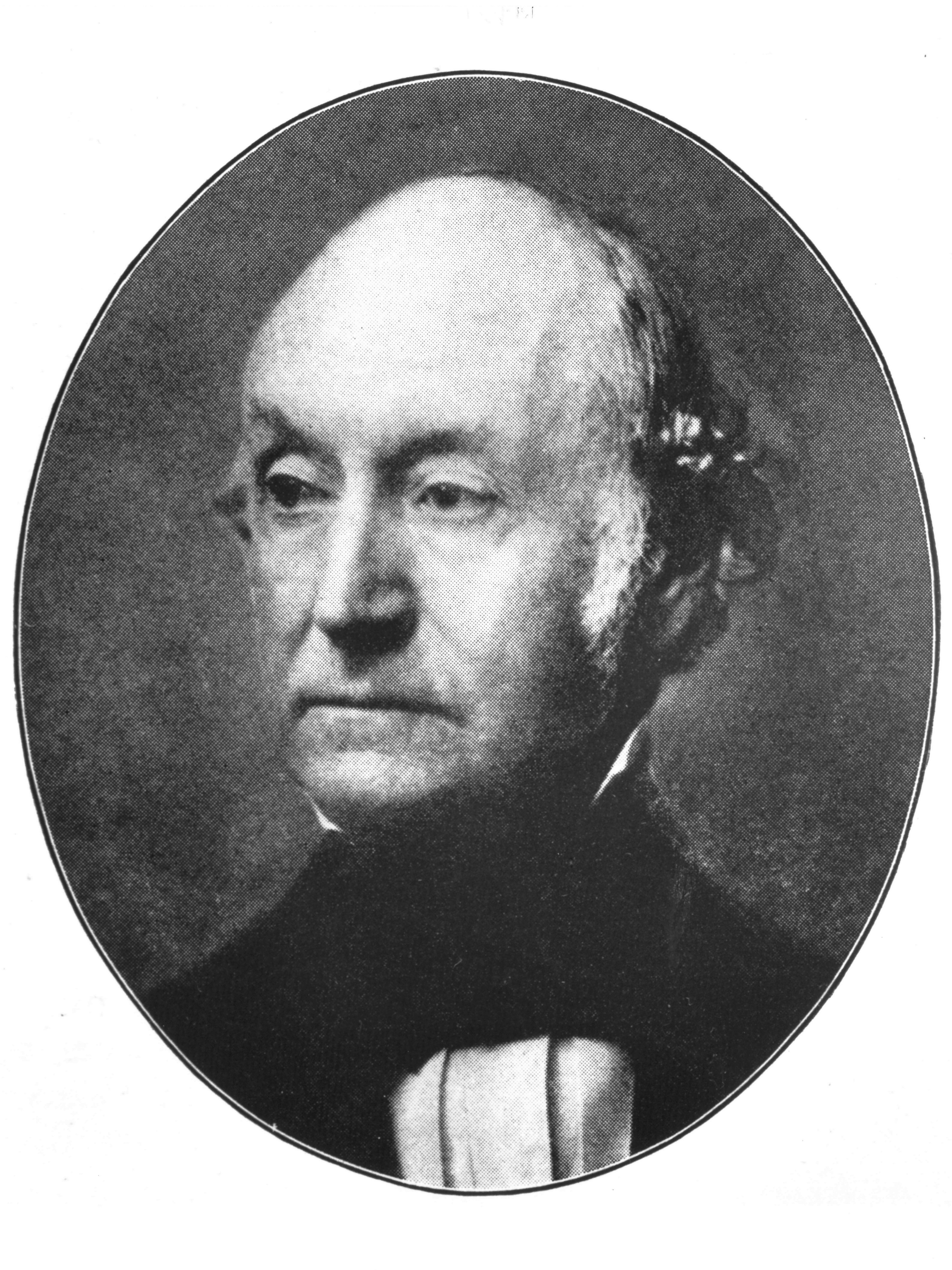

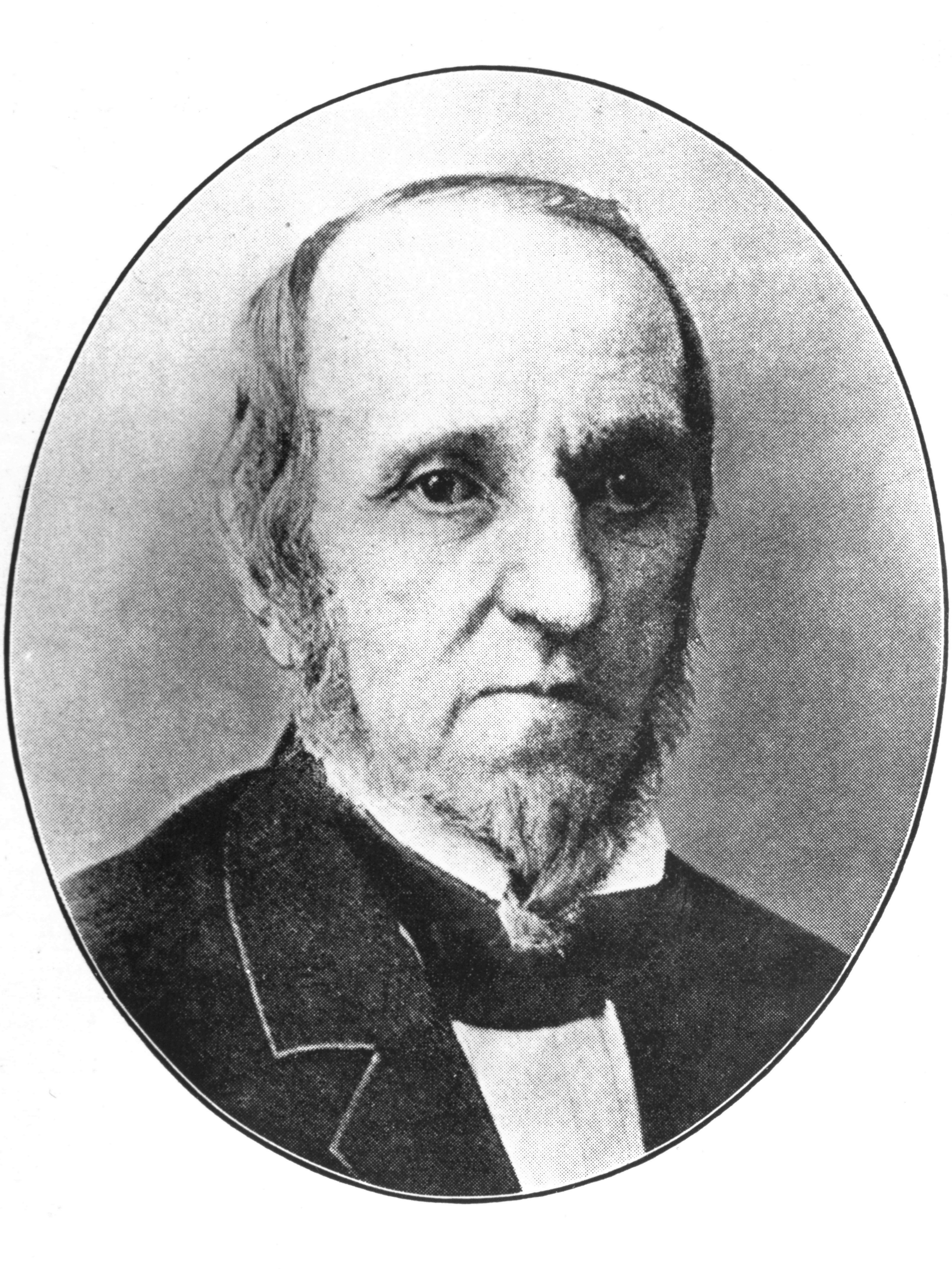
Candidate	Jerome V. C. Smith	Benjamin Seaver	John P. Bigelow
Party	Citizens Union Party	Whig	Whig
First vote	4,690; 35.97%	5,651; 43.34%	Did not contest
Second vote	6,077; 49.94%	Did not contest	4,489; 36.89%
Third vote	6,840; 56.59%	Did not contest	Did not contest
Candidate	John H. Wilkins	Jacob Sleeper	James Whiting
Party	Whig	Young Men's League	Bay State Club and Liquor Union
First vote	Did not contest	2,097; 16.08%	Did not contest
Second vote	Did not contest	775; 6.37%	Did not contest
Third vote	3,171; 26.23%	Did not contest	1,730; 14.31%
Candidate	Aaron Hobart
Party	Democratic
First vote	Did not contest
Second vote	748; 6.15%
Third vote	282; 2.33%
Mayor before election
Benjamin Seaver
Whig
Elected mayor
Jerome V. C. Smith

The Boston mayoral election of 1853–1854 saw the election of Citizens Union Party nominee Jerome V. C. Smith. The election took three votes, as no candidate secured the needed majority in the first two attempts. Incumbent Whig mayor Benjamin Seaver had run for reelection as his party's nominee in the first vote, but opted not to compete in the second or third votes.

It was the sixth and final Boston mayoral election to require multiple general election attempts before a winner could be determined. The previous elections where this had occurred were the 1822, 1828, 1831, 1844–45, and 1851 mayoral elections.

== First vote (December 12, 1853) ==
Candidates

- Frederick H. Allen
- Benjamin Seaver (Whig Party), incumbent mayor
- Jacob Sleeper (Young Men's League), member of the Boston Board of Aldermen
- Jerome V. C. Smith, physician and candidate for mayor in 1851 and 1852

Result

Boston mayoral election first vote (December 12, 1853)
Party	Candidate	Votes	%
Whig	Benjamin Seaver (incumbent)	5,651	43.34%
	Jerome V. C. Smith	4,690	35.97%
Young Men's League	Jacob Sleeper	2,097	16.08%
	Frederick H. Allen	596	4.57%
Scattering	Other	5	0.03%
Total votes		13,039	100

== Second vote (December 27, 1853) ==
After he failed to win a majority in the first vote, Mayor Seaver refused to again run in the second vote. After this, the city's Whig Party committee nominated former mayor Josiah Quincy III, who declined. They then nominated Thomas Coffin Amory, who also declined. They then nominated former mayor John P. Bigelow. The Democratic Party nominated Aaron Hobart. As with the first vote, no winner was elected as no candidate won a majority share of the vote. Jerome V. C. Smith fell short of a majority by a mere nine votes.

Candidates

- Aaron Hobart (Democratic)
- Jacob Sleeper
- Jerome V. C. Smith, physician and candidate for mayor in 1851 and 1852
- John P. Bigelow (Whig), former mayor

Result

Boston mayoral election second vote (December 27, 1854)
Party	Candidate	Votes	%
	Jerome V. C. Smith	6,077	49.94%
Whig	John P. Bigelow	4,489	36.89%
	Jacob Sleeper	775	6.37%
Democratic	Aaron Hobart	748	6.15%
Scattering	Other	79	6.49%
Total votes		12,168	100

== Third vote (January 9, 1854) ==
Citizens Union Party nominee Jerome V. C. Smith was elected after winning a majority in the third vote.

In the third vote, John H. Wilkins replaced Bigelow as the Whig Party's nominee.

Candidates

- Aaron Hobart (Democratic), probate judge and former U.S. congressman
- Jerome V. C. Smith (Citizens Union Party), physician and candidate for mayor in 1851 and 1852
- James Whiting (Bay State Club and Liquor Union)
- John H. Wilkins (Whig)

Result

Boston mayoral election third vote (January 9, 1854)
Party	Candidate	Votes	%
Citizens Union Party	Jerome V. C. Smith	6,840	56.59%
Whig	John H. Wilkins	3,171	26.23%
Bay State Club and Liquor Union	James Whiting	1,730	14.31%
Democratic	Aaron Hobart	282	2.33%
Scattering	Other	65	0.54%
Total votes		12,088	100

== Summary table of all votes ==
1853–1854 Boston mayoral election results
Vote round	Whig Party		Democratic Party		Citizens Union Party		Young Men's League		Bay State Club and Liquor Union		Scattering
Vote round	Nominee	%	Nominee	%	Nominee	%	Nominee	%	Nominee	%	%
1st	Benjamin Seaver (incumbent)	43.34	—N/a		Jerome V. C. Smith	35.97	Jacob Sleeper	16.08	—N/a		0.03
2nd	John P. Bigelow	36.89	Aaron Hobart	6.15	Jerome V. C. Smith	49.94	Jacob Sleeper	6.37	—N/a		6.49
3rd	John H. Wilkins	26.23	Aaron Hobart	2.33	Jerome V. C. Smith	56.59	—N/a		James Whiting	14.31	0.54

== See also ==
- List of mayors of Boston, Massachusetts
