= 1849 Boston mayoral election =

Election in Massachusetts, United States

- December 10, 1849
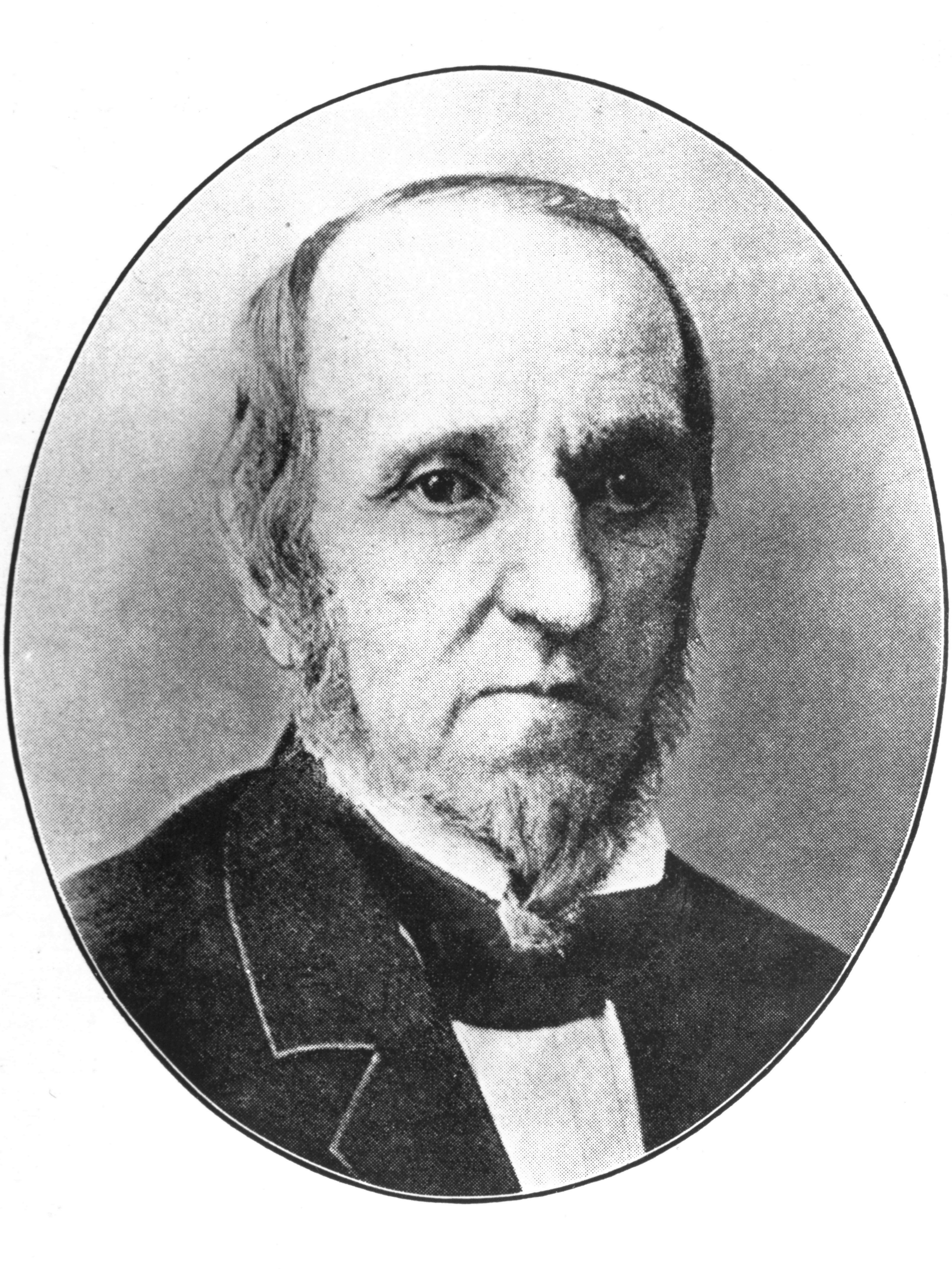

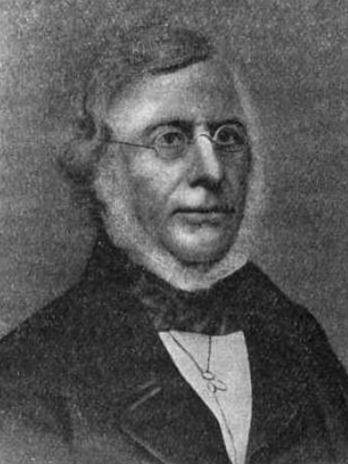

Candidate	John P. Bigelow	Joseph Hall	Bradford Sumner
Party	Whig	Democratic	Free Soil
Popular vote	4,543	705	349
Percentage	80.68%	12.52%	6.20%
Mayor before election
John P. Bigelow
Whig
Elected mayor
John P. Bigelow
Whig

The 1849 Boston mayoral election saw the reelection of incumbent Whig mayor John P. Bigelow. It was held on December 10, 1849.

== Candidates ==
- John P. Bigelow (Whig Party), incumbent mayor
- Joseph Hall (Democratic Party), former member of the United States House of Representatives from Maine and former measurer of the Boston Custom House
- Bradford Sumner (Free Soil Party), candidate for mayor in 1839, 1842, and 1848, candidate for U.S. House of Representatives in 1838 and 1839

== Results ==
1849 Boston mayoral election
Party	Candidate	Votes	%
Whig	John P. Bigelow (incumbent)	4,543	80.68
Democratic	Joseph Hall	705	12.52
Free Soil	Bradford Sumner	349	6.20
Scattering	Other	34	0.60
Total votes		5,631	100

== See also ==
- List of mayors of Boston, Massachusetts
