= 1851 Boston mayoral election =

Election in Massachusetts, United States

- Dec. 8, 1851 (1st vote); Dec. 17, 1851 (2nd vote); Dec. 24, 1851 (3rd vote)
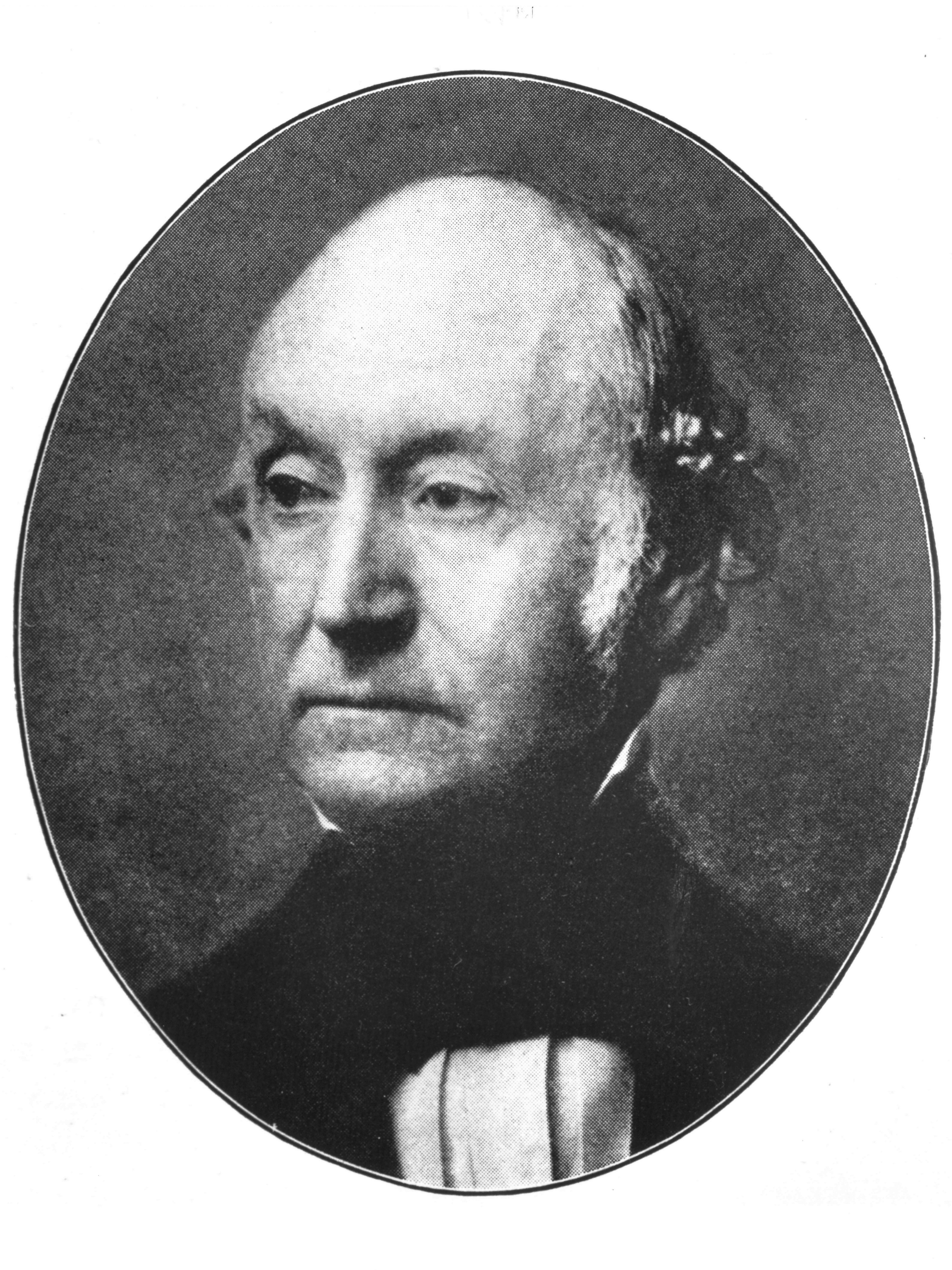

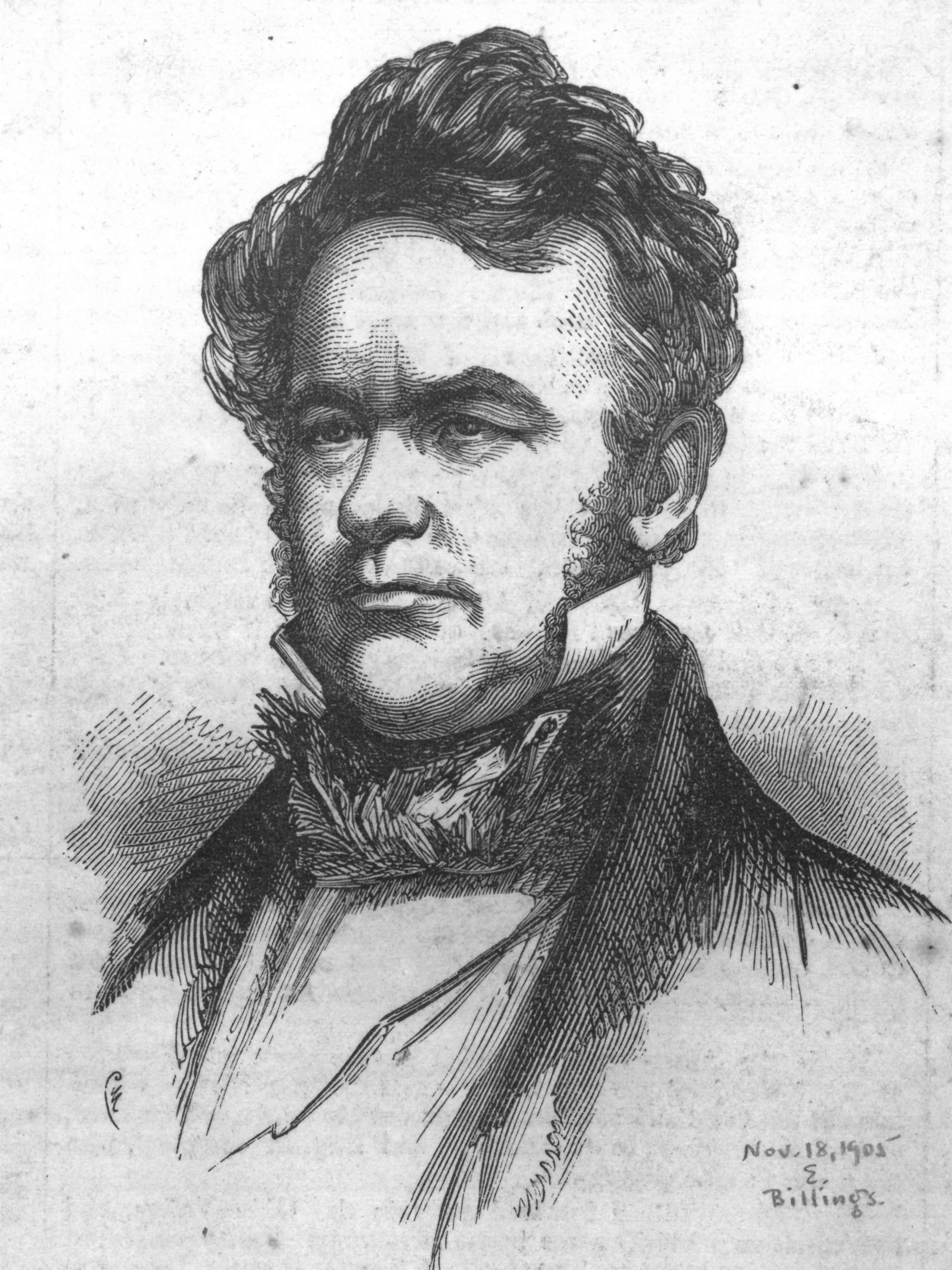

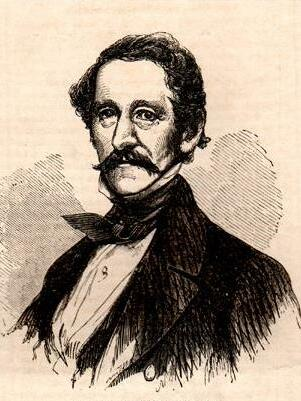
| Candidate | Benjamin Seaver | John H. Wilkins |
| Party | Whig | Whig |
| First vote | Did not contest | 4,423; 45.13% |
| Second vote | 3,970; 47.31% | Did not contest |
| Third vote | 3,990; 50.05% | Did not contest |
| Candidate | Jerome V. C. Smith | Adam W. Thaxter Jr. |
| Party | Know Nothing | Democratic |
| First vote | 2,672; 27.26% | 1,250; 21.95% |
| Second vote | 2,680; 31.94% | 1,290; 15.37% |
| Third vote | 2,736; 34.32% | 1,024; 12.84% |
Mayor before election
John P. Bigelow
Whig
Elected mayor
Benjamin Seaver
Whig

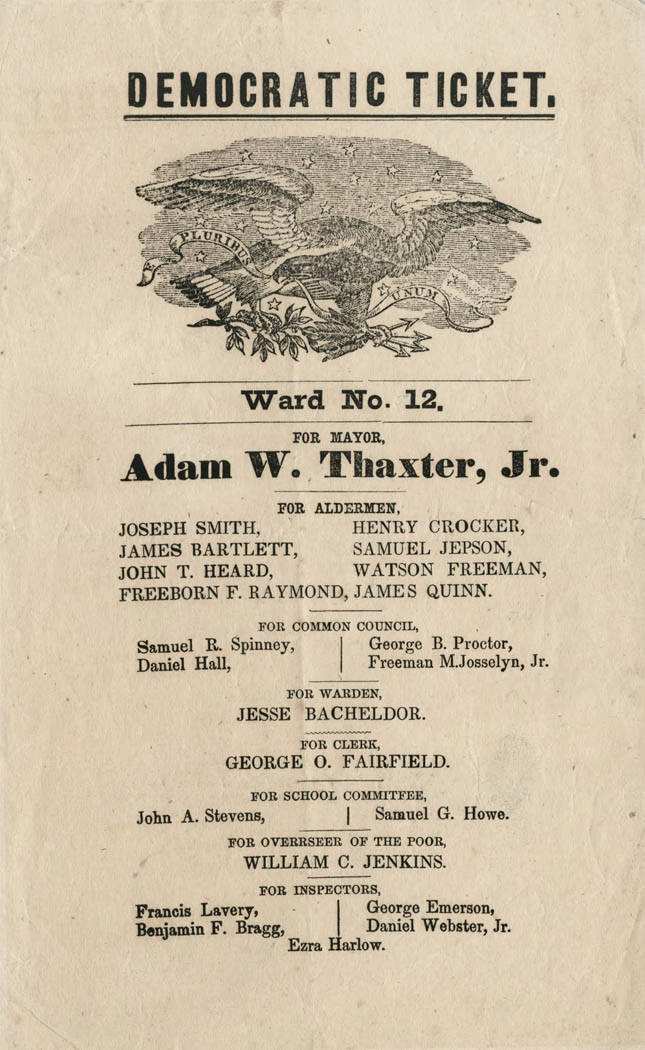
Ward 12 Democratic Party ticket from the 1851 election

The 1851 Boston mayoral election saw the election of Benjamin Seaver, a former president of the Boston Common Council, as mayor of Boston. The election took three votes, as no candidate secured the needed majority in the first two attempts. In the third attempt, Seaver won the required majority by the margin of a single vote. Incumbent Whig mayor John P. Bigelow was not a nominee for reelection.

== First vote (December 8, 1851) ==
Candidates

- Jerome V. C. Smith ("Native American Party" –Know Nothing), physician
- John H. Wilkins (Whig)
- George F. Williams (Free Soil Party)
- Adam Wallace Thaxter Jr. (Democratic Party), merchant and Democratic for mayor in the first vote of the 1844 election

Result

Boston mayoral election first vote (December 8, 1851)
| Party | Candidate | Votes | % |
|---|---|---|---|
| Whig | John H. Wilkins | 4,423 | 45.13 |
| Know Nothing | Jerome V. C. Smith | 2,672 | 27.26 |
| Democratic | Adam W. Thaxter Jr. | 2,150 | 21.94 |
| Free Soil | George F. Williams | 475 | 4.85 |
| Scattering | Other | 81 | 0.83 |
| Total votes | | 9,801 | 100 |

== Second vote (December 17, 1851) ==
Candidates

- Benjamin Seaver (Whig), former president of the Boston Common Council
- Jerome V. C. Smith, physician
- John H. Wilkins
- George F. Williams
- Henry B. Rogers
- Adam Wallace Thaxter Jr., merchant and candidate for mayor in 1844

Result

Boston mayoral election second vote (December 17, 1851)
| Party | Candidate | Votes | % |
|---|---|---|---|
| Whig | Benjamin Seaver | 3,970 | 47.31 |
| Know Nothing | Jerome V. C. Smith | 2,680 | 31.94 |
| Democratic | Adam W. Thaxter Jr. | 1,290 | 15.37 |
| Free Soil | George F. Williams | 244 | 2.91 |
| | Henry B. Rogers | 158 | 1.88 |
| Scattering | Other | 50 | 0.60 |
| Total votes | | 8,392 | 100 |

== Third vote (December 24, 1851) ==
Candidates

- Benjamin Seaver (Whig), former president of the Boston Common Council
- Jerome V. C. Smith, physician
- Henry B. Rogers
- Adam Wallace Thaxter Jr., merchant and candidate for mayor in 1844

Result

Boston mayoral election third vote (December 24, 1851)
| Party | Candidate | Votes | % |
|---|---|---|---|
| Whig | Benjamin Seaver | 3,990 | 50.05 |
| Know Nothing | Jerome V. C. Smith | 2,736 | 34.32 |
| Democratic | Adam W. Thaxter Jr. | 1,024 | 12.84 |
| | Henry B. Rogers | 188 | 2.36 |
| Scattering | Other | 38 | 0.48 |
| Total votes | | 7,976 | 100 |

== Summary table of all votes ==
1851 Boston mayoral election results
| Vote round | Whig Party | | Democratic Party | | Know Nothing Party | | Free Soil Party | | Other candidate | | Scattering |
| Vote round | Nominee | % | Nominee | % | Nominee | % | Nominee | % | Candidate | % | % |
|---|---|---|---|---|---|---|---|---|---|---|---|
| 1st | John H. Wilkins | 45.13 | Adam W. Thaxter Jr | 21.95 | Jerome V. C. Smith | 27.26 | George F. Williams | 4.85 | —N/a | | 0.83 |
| 2nd | Benjamin Seaver | 47.31 | Adam W. Thaxter Jr | 15.37 | Jerome V. C. Smith | 31.94 | George F. Williams | 2.91 | Henry B. Rogers | 1.88 | 0.60 |
| 3rd | Benjamin Seaver | 50.05 | Adam W. Thaxter Jr | 12.84 | Jerome V. C. Smith | 34.32 | —N/a | | Henry B. Rogers | 2.36 | 0.48 |

== See also ==
- List of mayors of Boston, Massachusetts
