= December 1854 Boston mayoral election =

Election in Massachusetts, United States

- December 11, 1854
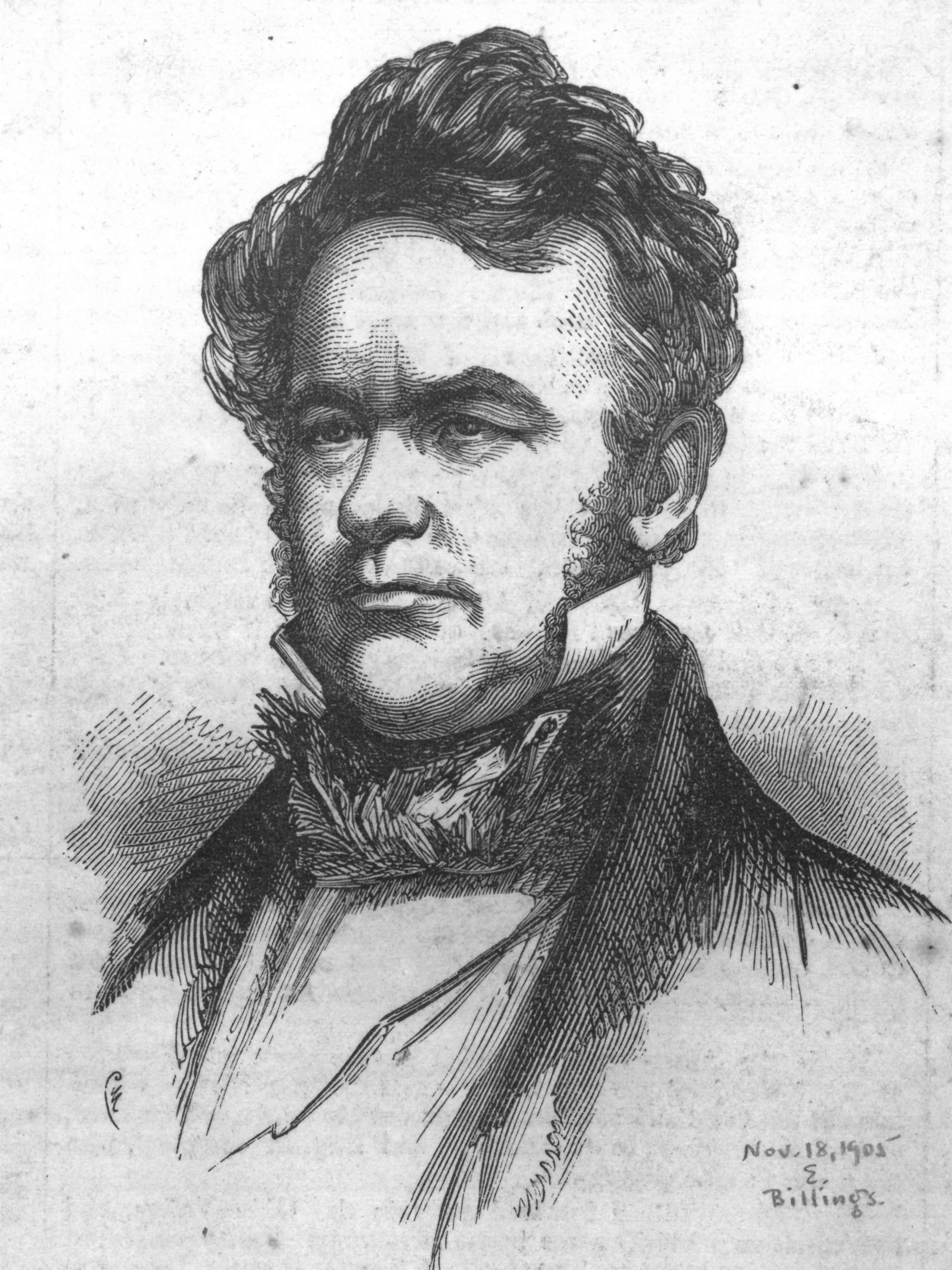

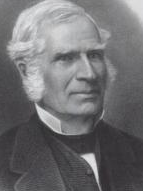

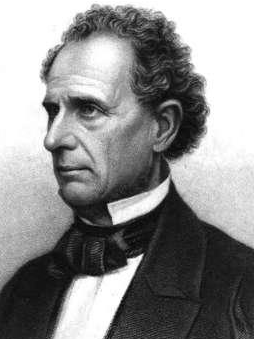
Candidate	Jerome V. C. Smith	George Bruce Upton	Isaac Adams
Party	Know Nothing	Whig	Democratic
Popular vote	6,429	4,409	703
Percentage	55.50%	38.06%	6.07%
Mayor before election
Jerome V. C. Smith
Know Nothing
Elected mayor
Jerome V. C. Smith
Know Nothing

The Boston mayoral election of 1854 saw the reelection of incumbent mayor Jerome V. C. Smith. It was held on December 11, 1854.

== Candidates ==
- Isaac Adams (Democratic Party), inventor and former member of the Massachusetts Senate
- Jerome V. C. Smith (Know Nothing), incumbent mayor
- George Bruce Upton (Whig Party), former member of the Massachusetts Executive Council

== Results ==
The Know Nothings performed strongly in the December 1854 Boston municipal elections, winning not only the mayoralty, but also control of both chambers of the Boston City Council. The New York Daily Herald reported that the Know Nothings won the all seats on the Boston Board of Aldermen and three-quarters of the Boston Common Council.

1854 Boston mayoral election
Party	Candidate	Votes	%
Know Nothing	Jerome V. C. Smith (incumbent)	6,429	55.50
Whig	George Bruce Upton	4,409	38.06
Democratic	Isaac Adams	703	6.07
Other	Scattering	42	0.36
Turnout		11,583	100

== See also ==
- List of mayors of Boston, Massachusetts
