= Senator Upton =

Senator Upton may refer to:

- George Bruce Upton (1804–1874), Massachusetts State Senate
- Jay H. Upton (1879–1938), Oregon State Senate
- Robert W. Upton (1884–1972), U.S. Senator from New Hampshire from 1953 to 1954
