= 1848 Boston mayoral election =

Election in Massachusetts, United States

- December 11, 1848
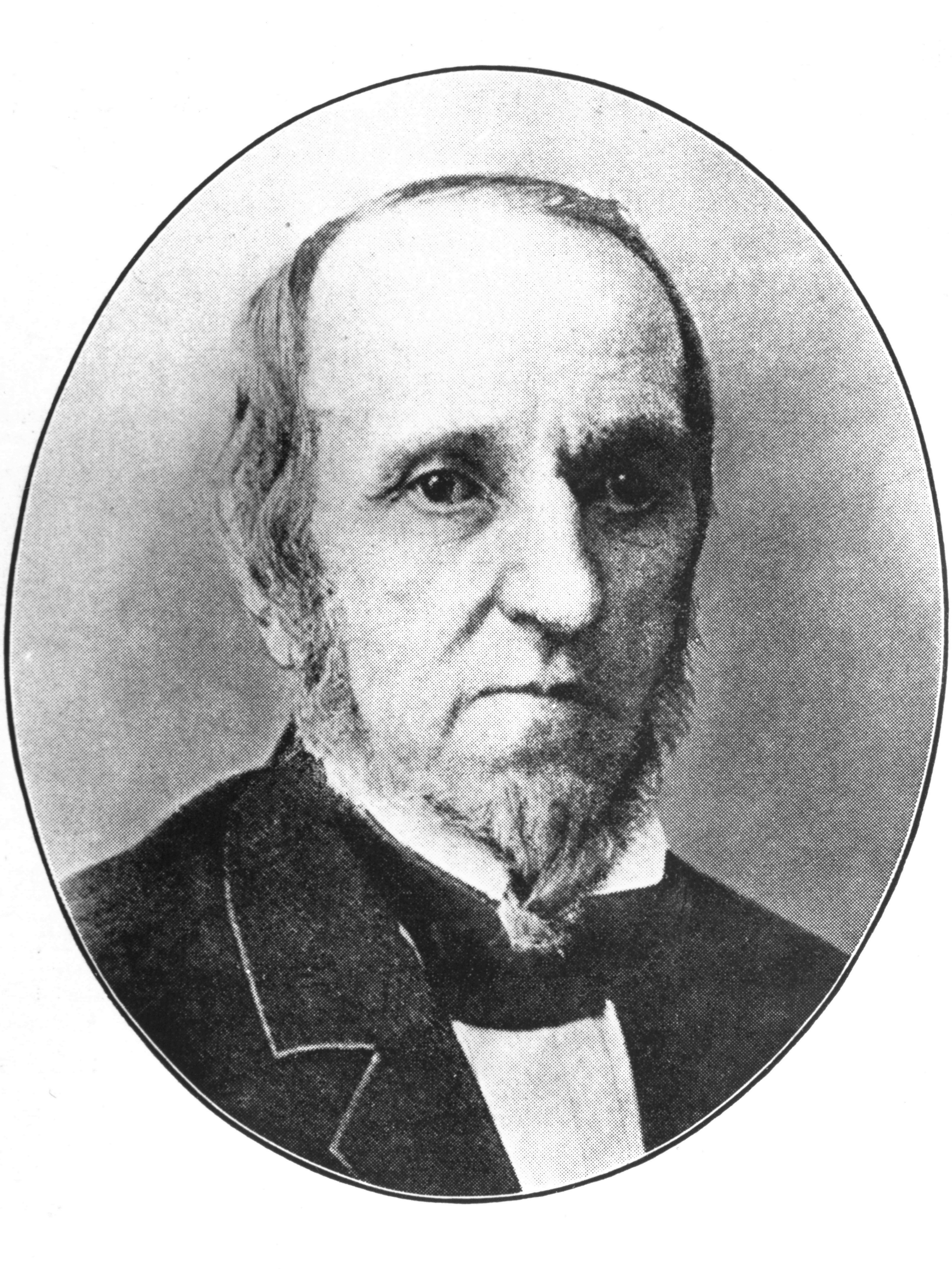

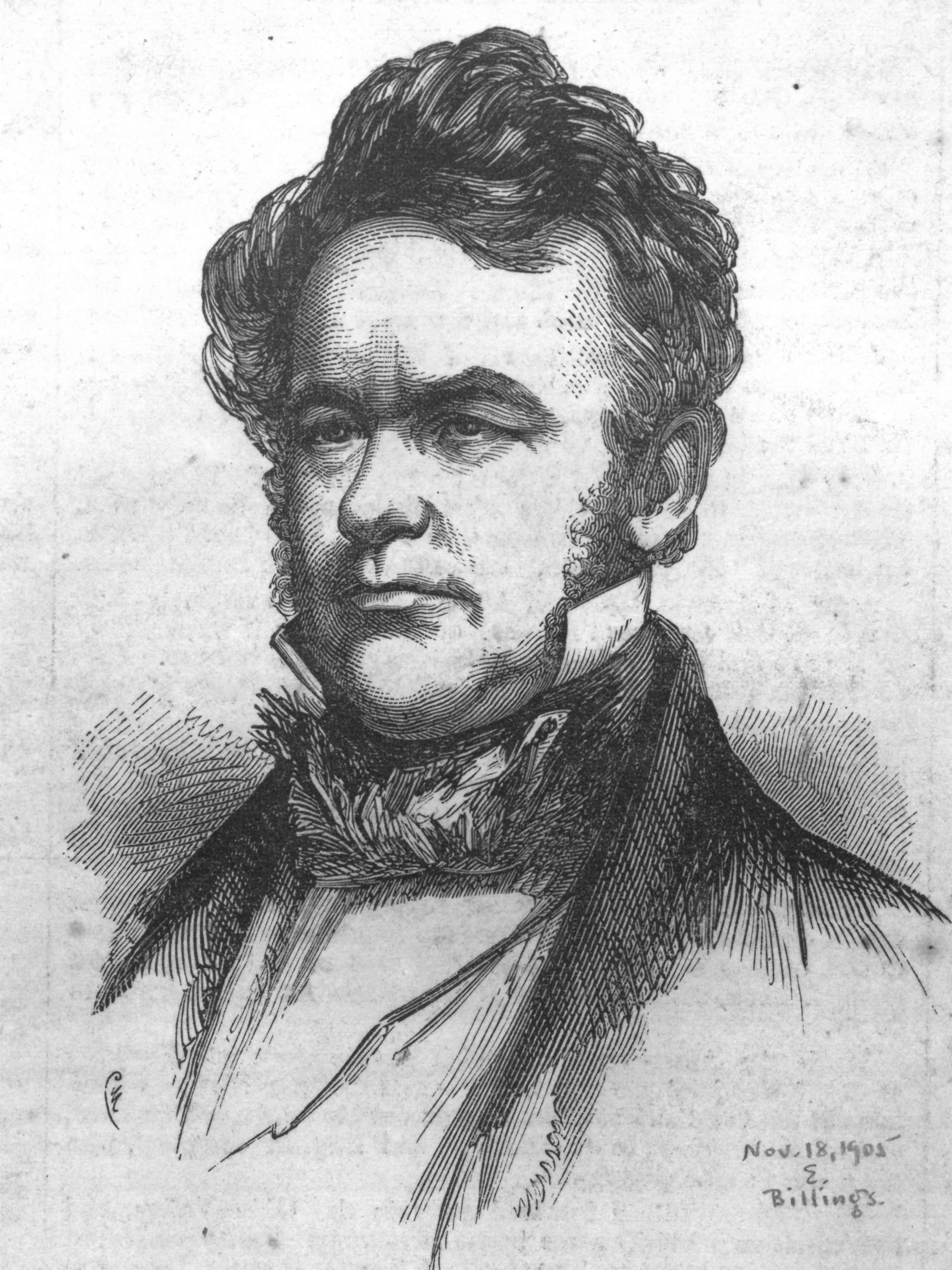
Candidate	John P. Bigelow	John W. James
Party	Whig	Democratic
Popular vote	5,150	1,143
Percentage	66.03%	14.65%
Candidate	Bradford Sumner	Jerome V. C. Smith
Party	Free Soil	Know Nothing
Popular vote	929	417
Percentage	11.91%	5.35%
Mayor before election
Josiah Quincy Jr.
Whig
Elected mayor
John P. Bigelow
Whig

The 1848 Boston mayoral election saw the election of Whig Party nominee John P. Bigelow. It was held on December 11, 1848. Incumbent Whig mayor Josiah Quincy Jr. was not a nominee for reelection.

== Candidates ==
- John P. Bigelow (Whig Party) former Massachusetts secretary of the Commonwealth
- Edward Brooks (independent candidate)
- John W. James (Democratic Party/Locofoco), candidate for mayor in 1835 and 1836
- Jerome V. C. Smith ("Native American Party" –Know Nothing)
- Bradford Sumner (Free Soil Party), candidate for mayor in 1839 and 1842 and candidate for U.S. House of Representatives in 1838 and 1839

== Results ==
1848 Boston mayoral election
Party	Candidate	Votes	%
Whig	John P. Bigelow	5,150	66.03
Democratic	John W. James	1,143	14.65
Free Soil	Bradford Sumner	929	11.91
Know Nothing	Jerome V. C. Smith	417	5.35
Independent	Edward Brooks	132	1.69
Scattering	Other	29	0.60
Total votes		7,800	100

== See also ==
- List of mayors of Boston, Massachusetts
