= John A. Bolles =

American politician

John Augustus Bolles

8th Massachusetts Secretary of the Commonwealth
- In office 1843–1844
- Governor: Marcus Morton
- Preceded by: John P. Bigelow
- Succeeded by: John G. Palfrey

Personal details
- Born: April 16, 1809 Ashford, Connecticut
- Died: May 25, 1878 (aged 69) Washington, D.C.
- Resting place: Forest Hills Cemetery Jamaica Plain Massachusetts
- Party: Whig
- Spouse(s): Catherine Hartwell Dix, m. November 11, 1834.
- Education: Brown University, 1829, M.A. 1832
- Profession: Lawyer

Military service
- Allegiance: United States of America; Union
- Branch/service: Union Army
- Years of service: January 30, 1862-July 17, 1865
- Rank: Major; Bvt. Brigadier General
- Unit: VII Corps
- Commands: Aide de Camp to John Adams Dix, and Judge Advocate
- Battles/wars: Battle of South Mountain, American Civil War

John Augustus Bolles (April 16, 1809 – May 25, 1878) was an American politician who, from 1843–1844, served as the Massachusetts Secretary of the Commonwealth. He also served as a staff officer in the Union Army during the American Civil War and was brevetted to Brigadier General. Bolles was the son of an abolitionist preacher and the brother in law of General John Adams Dix. He was also an accomplished legal scholar prior to the war and advised the War Department on the legality of upholding the conviction of Clement Vallandigham. Bolles had conducted the first broad study of the Dorr Rebellion as well as Chief Justice Taney's opinion in Luther v. Borden and concluded that the federal judiciary could not take jurisdiction over Vallandigham's appeals. The judiciary sided with Bolles on this matter.

He was a member of the Boston Vigilance Committee, an organization that assisted fugitive slaves.

== Death ==
Bolles died on May 25, 1878, in Washington, D.C. He was buried in Forest Hills Cemetery in the Jamaica Plain neighborhood of Boston, Massachusetts.

Political offices
| Preceded by John P. Bigelow | 8th Massachusetts Secretary of the Commonwealth; 1843–1844 | Succeeded by John G. Palfrey |
