= Jonathan Chapman =

American politician

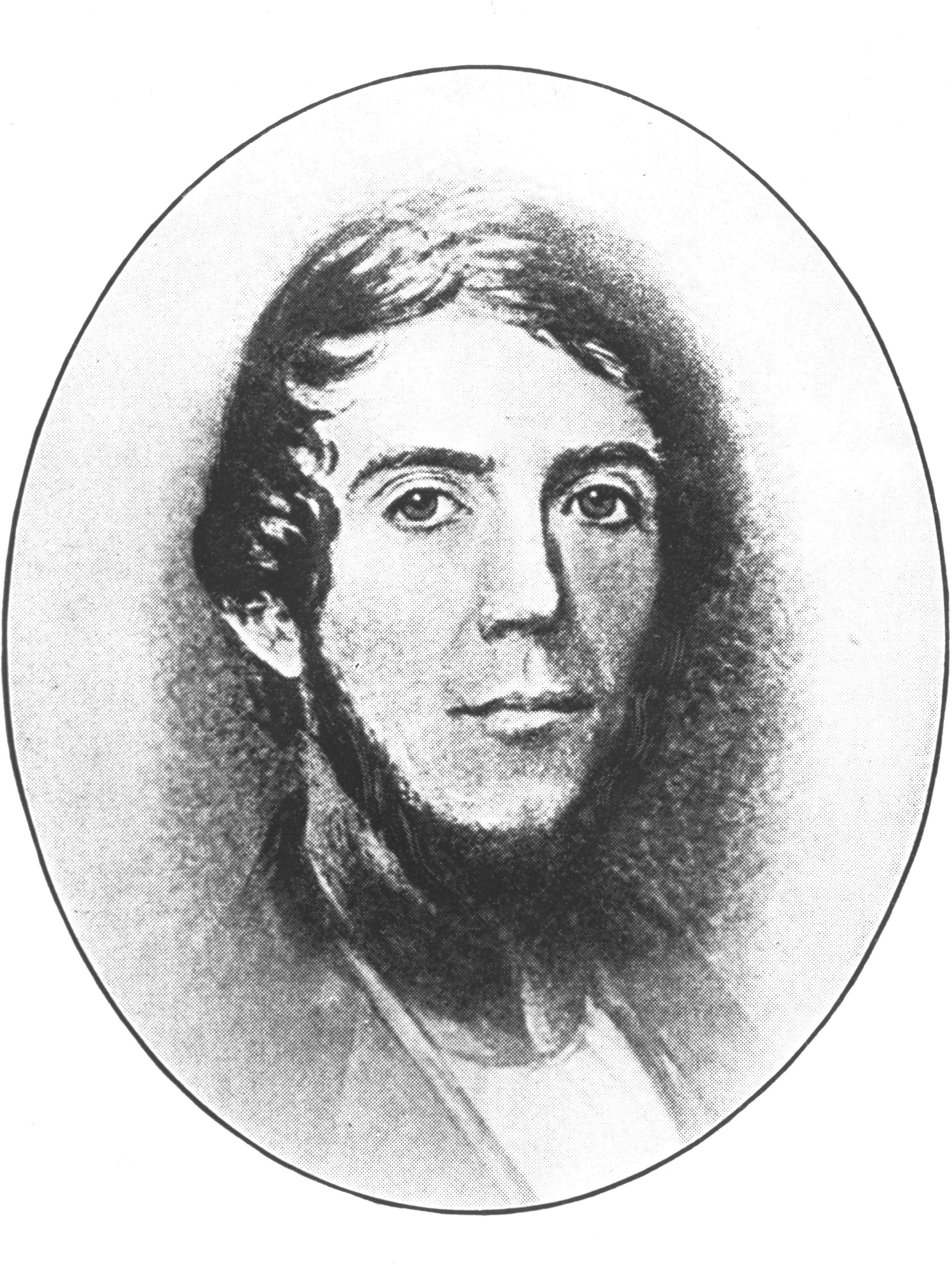

8th Mayor of Boston, Massachusetts
- In office 1840–1843
- Preceded by: Samuel A. Eliot
- Succeeded by: Martin Brimmer

Member of the Boston Common Council
- In office 1838–1838
- In office 1835–1836

Personal details
- Born: January 23, 1807
- Died: May 25, 1848 (aged 41)
- Party: Whig
- Spouse: Lucinda Dwight (Born July 7, 1809; Married April 25, 1832)
- Children: Jonathan Chapman (b. March 11, 1836); Eliza Chapman (b. March 10, 1838)
- Education: Phillips Exeter AcademyHarvard, class of 1825.
- Profession: Attorney

Jonathan Chapman (January 23, 1807 – May 25, 1848) was an American politician who served as the eighth mayor of Boston, Massachusetts from 1840 to 1842.

== Early life ==
Jonathan Chapman was born on January 23, 1807, son of a man also named Jonathan Chapman. His father served as a member of the Town of Boston's Board of Selectmen.

Chapman attended Phillips Exeter Academy, graduated from Harvard College, and studied law under the direction of Judge Lemuel Shaw.

== Mayoralty ==
Chapman was elected mayor of Boston in the December 1839 Boston mayoral election as the Whig candidate; he was sworn into office in 1840; he served three one-year terms.

Because of a large increase of the debt of the city of Boston in the 18 years since it was incorporated, Mayor Chapman had as a chief aim of his administration the reduction of the city's debt.

Although land had been purchased for a new city hall, Mayor Chapman did not favor that project. Because Suffolk County was constructing a new building for the Registry and Probate offices and was going to move out of the old courthouse building, Chapman instead recommended that the old Suffolk County Courthouse be remodeled for use as Boston's city hall.

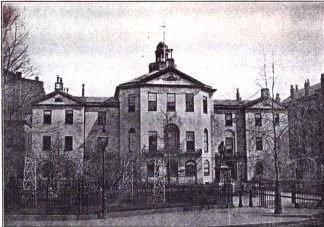
Boston's City Hall from 1841 to 1865 (Old Suffolk County Courthouse 1810–1841)

The city occupied the renovated structure on March 18, 1841.

=== Steamship Service ===
Chapman spoke of the great importance of the establishment of the Cunard Lines steamship service between Boston and Liverpool, England.

=== The Western Railroad ===
Chapman also spoke of the great importance of the opening up of the Western Railroad from Boston to the Hudson River.

Chapman did not run for re-election in the 1842 Boston mayoral election.

== Personal life ==
Chapman married Lucindia Dwight (born July 7, 1809) on April 25, 1832. They had two children together, Jonathan (born March 11, 1836) and Eliza (born March 10, 1838).

Chapman died on May 25, 1848, at the age of 41. He is the shortest-lived mayor of Boston.

== See also ==
- Timeline of Boston, 1830s–1840s

== Notes ==
Political offices
Preceded by Samuel A. Eliot	Mayor of Boston, Massachusetts; 1840–1842	Succeeded by Martin Brimmer
