= 1850 Boston mayoral election =

Election in Massachusetts, United States

- December 9, 1850
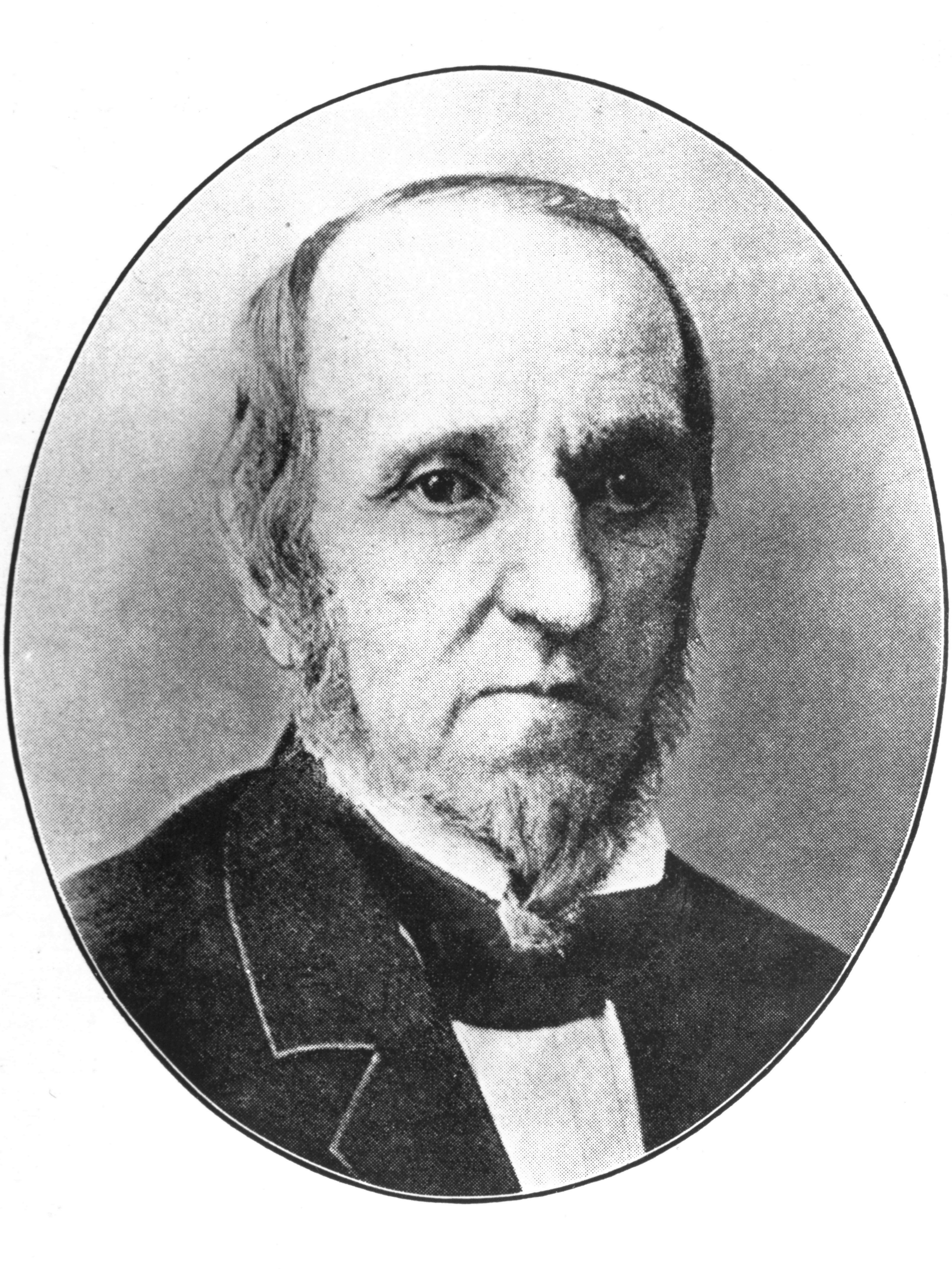

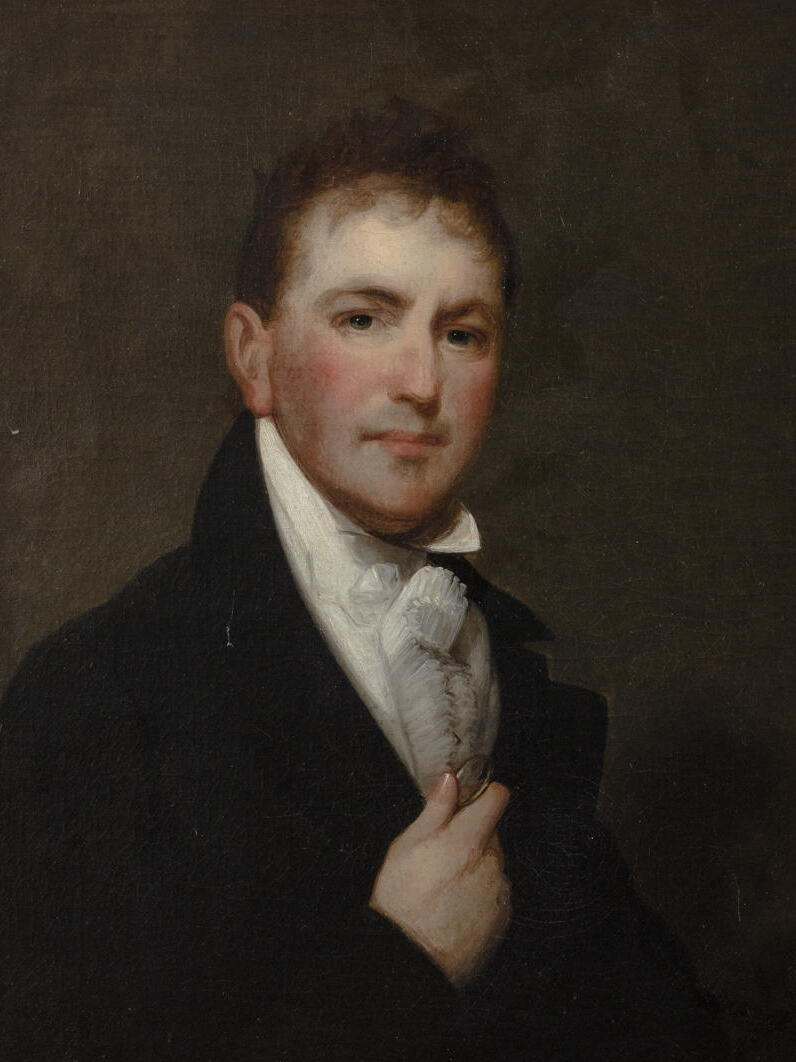
Candidate	John P. Bigelow	Charles Coffin Amory Sr.
Party	Whig	Independent Whig
Popular vote	5,473	1,169
Percentage	63.45%	13.55%
Candidate	Charles B. Goodrich	Benjamin B. Mussey
Party	Democratic	Free Soil
Popular vote	1,094	882
Percentage	12.68%	9.53%
Mayor before election
John P. Bigelow
Whig
Elected mayor
John P. Bigelow
Whig

The 1850 Boston mayoral election saw the reelection of incumbent Whig mayor John P. Bigelow to a third consecutive term. It was held on December 9, 1850.

== Candidates ==
- Charles Coffin Amory Sr. (independent Whig), alderman
- John P. Bigelow (Whig), incumbent mayor
- Charles B. Goodrich (Democratic Party), Democratic nominee for mayor in 1846 and 1847
- Benjamin B. Mussey (Free Soil)

Incumbent mayor John P. Bigelow was renominated by the city's Whig Party. However, some leading Boston Whigs did not approve of Bigelow's renomination and instead wanted to field a candidate from the city's West End. At the last-minute ahead of the election, 400 individuals signed nominating papers for Charles Coffin Amory to run as an independent Whig candidate.

== Campaign ==
Backers of Amory's last-minute candidacy of made last-minute accusations against Bigelow, painting him as lacking the "dignity" to hold his office. These accusations were levied so close to the election that there was effectively no time left for Bigelow to retort them. They also accused Bigelow of having designs of seeking the state's governorship in November 1851's gubernatorial election.

== Results ==
1850 Boston mayoral election
Party	Candidate	Votes	%
Whig	John P. Bigelow (incumbent)	5,473	63.45
Independent Whig	Charles Coffin Amory Sr.	1,169	13.55
Democratic	Charles B. Goodrich	1,094	12.68
Free Soil	Benjamin B. Mussey	822	9.53
Scattering	Other	68	0.08
Total votes		8,626	100

== See also ==
- List of mayors of Boston, Massachusetts
