= William Parker (Boston) =

American politician (1793–1873)

Acting Mayor of Boston, Massachusetts
- In office January 6, 1845 – February 27, 1845
- Preceded by: Martin Brimmer
- Succeeded by: Thomas Aspinwall Davis

Member of the Boston Board of Aldermen from Ward 10
- In office 1846–1847
- In office January 6, 1845 – March 6, 1845
- In office 1842–1843
- In office 1828

Personal details
- Born: November 7, 1793
- Died: October 29, 1873 (aged 79)
- Party: Whig
- Spouse: Julia Maria Stevens
- Children: Julia C. Parker, Sarah M. Parker, Grace Helen Parker
- Profession: Attorney

William Parker (November 7, 1793 – October 29, 1873) was an American businessman and politician, who served as acting mayor of Boston, Massachusetts in early 1845.

He was an unsuccessful candidate in the 1844–45 and 1847 Boston mayoral elections.

== Early life ==
Parker was one of thirteen children. Parker was the son of Bishop Samuel Parker and Ann (née Culter) Parker.

Political offices
Preceded by Martin Brimmer	Mayor of Boston, Massachusetts (acting); January 6, 1845 – February 27, 1845	Succeeded by Thomas Aspinwall Davis
