= Jerome V. C. Smith =

American mayor

Jerome Van Crowninshield Smith
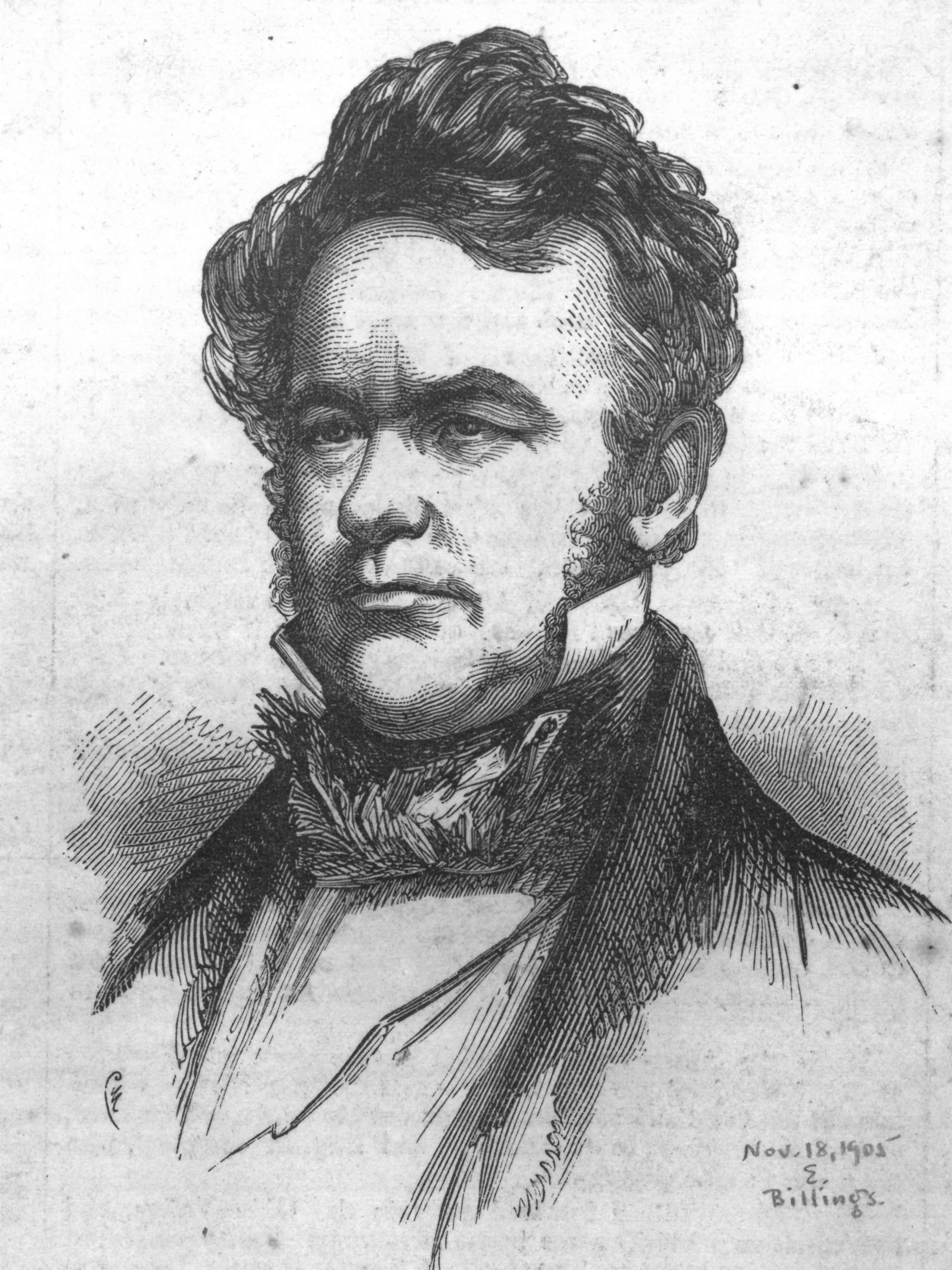

Mayor of Boston
- In office 1854–1855
- Preceded by: Benjamin Seaver
- Succeeded by: Alexander H. Rice

Personal details
- Born: July 20, 1800 Conway, New Hampshire, US
- Died: August 21, 1879 (aged 79) Richmond, Massachusetts, US
- Party: Native American Party
- Spouse: Eliza Ward Brown (1806–1876)
- Education: Brown University, Williams College
- Profession: Medical doctor

Jerome Van Crowninshield Smith (July 20, 1800 – August 21, 1879) was an American medical doctor, writer and politician, serving as the fourteenth mayor of Boston, Massachusetts from 1854 to 1855.

== Biography ==
After attending public school in his home town of Conway, New Hampshire, Smith earned a medical degree from Brown University in 1818 and graduated from the medical department of Williams College in 1822. In the following year, he took a position in Pittsfield, Massachusetts as lecturer in anatomy at the newly established Berkshire Medical Institution (later, Berkshire Medical College). In that same year (1823), he became the founding editor of the Boston Medical Intelligencer. After the publication was renamed to the Boston Medical and Surgical Journal in 1828, he continued as editor through 1856. Smith then established his own publication, The Medical World, which he edited from 1856 to 1857. He also edited the short-lived Bowen's Boston News-Letter and City Record (1825-6).

In civic affairs, Smith served as quarantine physician for the port of Boston (1826–48), and then ran for mayor of the city in December 1848, December 1851 and December 1852 before being elected mayor in January 1854. In each of these contests he was opposed by establishment Whig candidates, while he ran as the nominee of various dissident parties, including Native American ("Know Nothing"), People's Party and Citizen's Union. He was reelection in December 1854. Although nominated for mayor in 1858 by both the People's Union and National American parties, he declined to run.

In 1855, during his second term as mayor, Smith was awarded an honorary degree from Dartmouth College.

Smith served on numerous corporate boards, including those of several banks and railroads. He toured Europe and the Near East in 1850-51 and while abroad served as a juror for the American Industrial Exhibition at the London World's Fair.

In 1863, he removed to New York City, where he assumed the post of Professor of Anatomy at the New York Medical College and Charity Hospital.

During the Civil War, he volunteered to serve with the United States Christian Commission and was stationed with Union forces in New Orleans between October 1863 and August 1865. He was commissioned as lieutenant colonel, 83rd Regiment, U.S. Colored Infantry (Old Organization) and was appointed by General Nathaniel P. Banks to head a commission overseeing sanitation in the city.

Smith married Eliza Maria Brown (1806-1876) of Pittsfield, Massachusetts, on December 29, 1825.

He continued to lecture and write through his remaining years. He died on August 20, 1879, at the home of his sister-in-law in Richmond, Massachusetts. The cause was "a complication of diseases, dropsy and asthma." He is buried with his wife in the Pittsfield Cemetery.

== Select publications ==
- Animal Mechanism: The Eye, [Boston]: [Carter, Hendee & Babcock], [1831].
- The Class-Book of Anatomy, Designed for Schools, Explanatory of the First Principles of Human Mechanism, at the Basis of Physical Education, Boston: Allen & Ticknor, 1834.
- Scientific tracts and family lyceum. Designed for instruction and entertainment, and adapted to schools, lyceums and families, Allen & Ticknor, 1835.
- Indian Wars of America, Boston: G. Clarke, 1840.
- Natural History of the Fishes of Massachusetts, Boston: William Ticknor, 1843.
- Turkey and the Turks: or Travels in Turkey, Boston: F. Gleason, 1852.
- A pilgrimage to Egypt, embracing a diary of the explorations on the Nile; with observations illustrative of the manners, customs, and institutions of the people, and of the present condition of the antiquities and ruins ..., Boston: Gould & Lincoln, 1852.
- A Pilgrimage to Palestine ..., Boston: D. Clapp, Gould & Lincoln, 1853.
- The Ways of Women in Their Physical, Moral and Intellectual Relations. Hartford, CT: Dustin, Gilman, 1875.
- Buried millions: where do gold and silver go?, New York: A.S. Barnes, 1878.

== See also ==
- Timeline of Boston, 1850s

Political offices
Preceded by Benjamin Seaver	Mayor of Boston, Massachusetts; 1854–1855	Succeeded by Alexander H. Rice
