= 1843 Boston mayoral election =

Election in Massachusetts, United States

- December 11, 1843
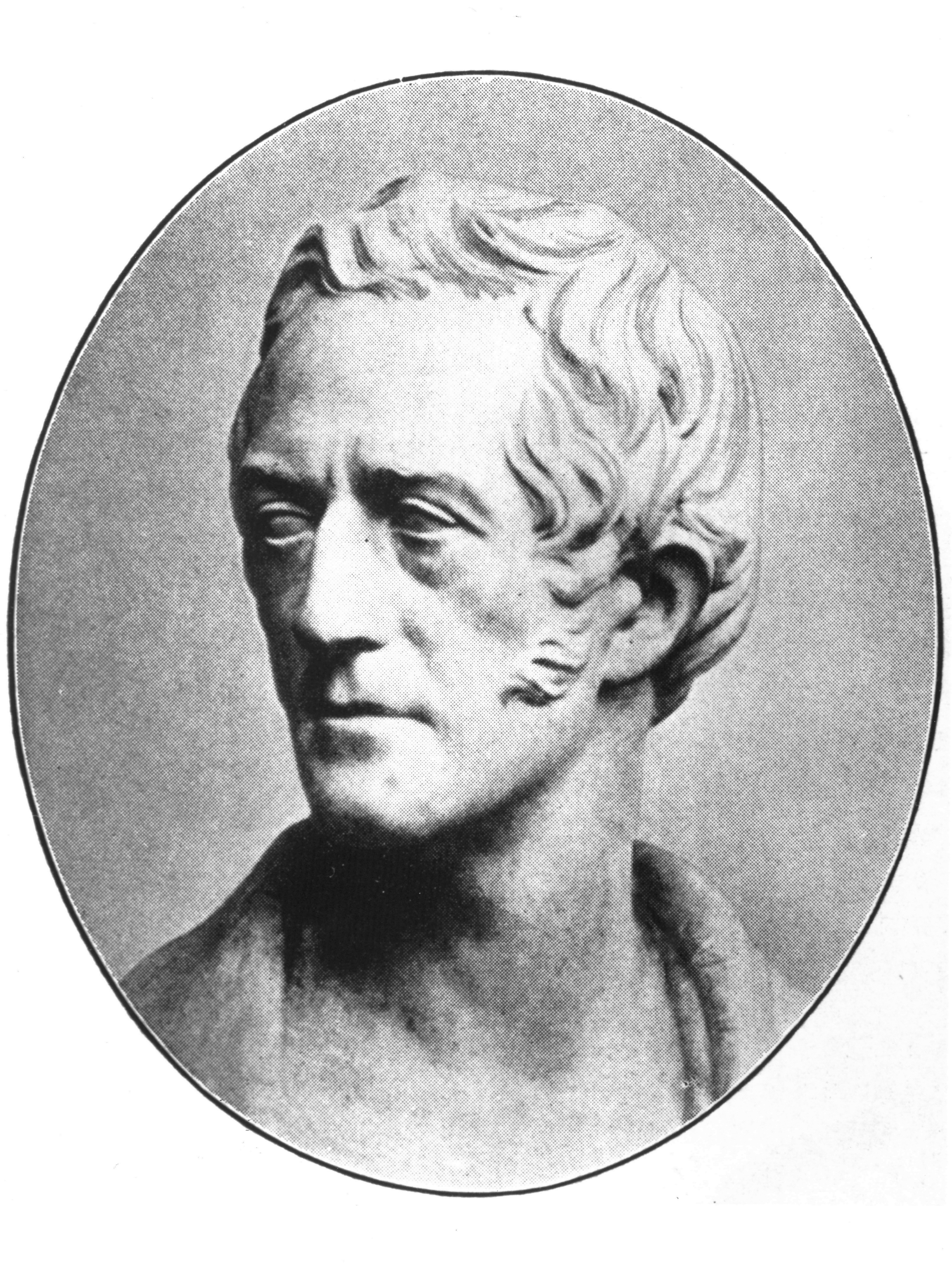

Candidate	Martin Brimmer	George Savage
Party	Whig	Democratic
Popular vote	4,874	2,237
Percentage	66.82%	30.68%
Mayor before election
Martin Brimmer
Whig
Elected mayor
Martin Brimmer
Whig

The 1843 Boston mayoral election saw the reelection of Whig Party incumbent Martin Brimmer. It was held on December 11, 1843.

== Campaign ==
Brimmer was the Whig Party nominee while Savage was the Democratic Party/locofoco nominee. The Whigs won a large victory in the coinciding municipal elections.

== Results ==
1843 Boston mayoral election
Party	Candidate	Votes	%
Whig	Martin Brimmer (incumbent)	4,874	66.82
Democratic	George Savage	2,237	30.68
Scattering	Other	183	2.51
Total votes		7,294	100

== See also ==
- List of mayors of Boston, Massachusetts
