= 1852 Boston mayoral election =

Election in Massachusetts, United States

- December 13, 1852
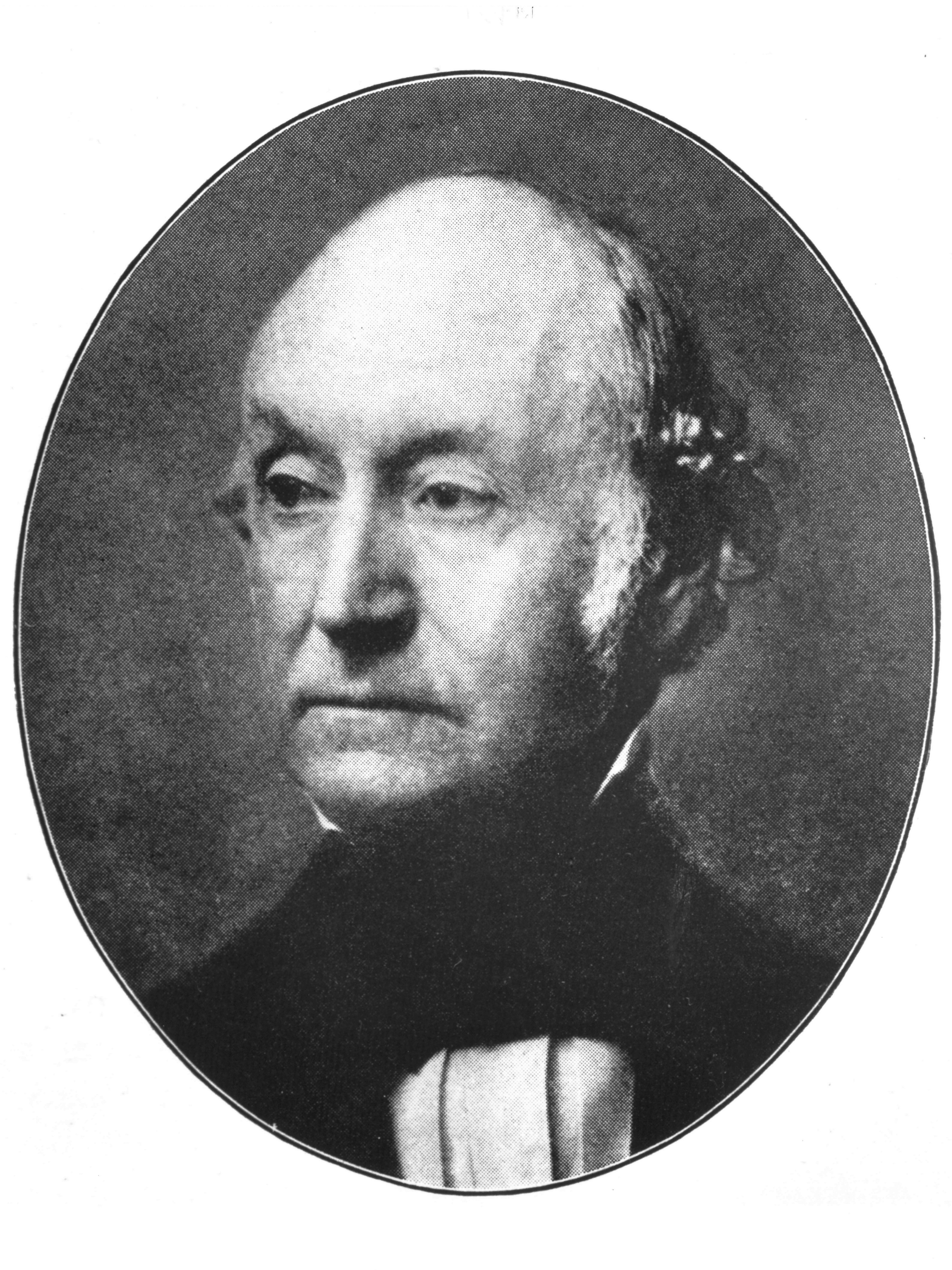

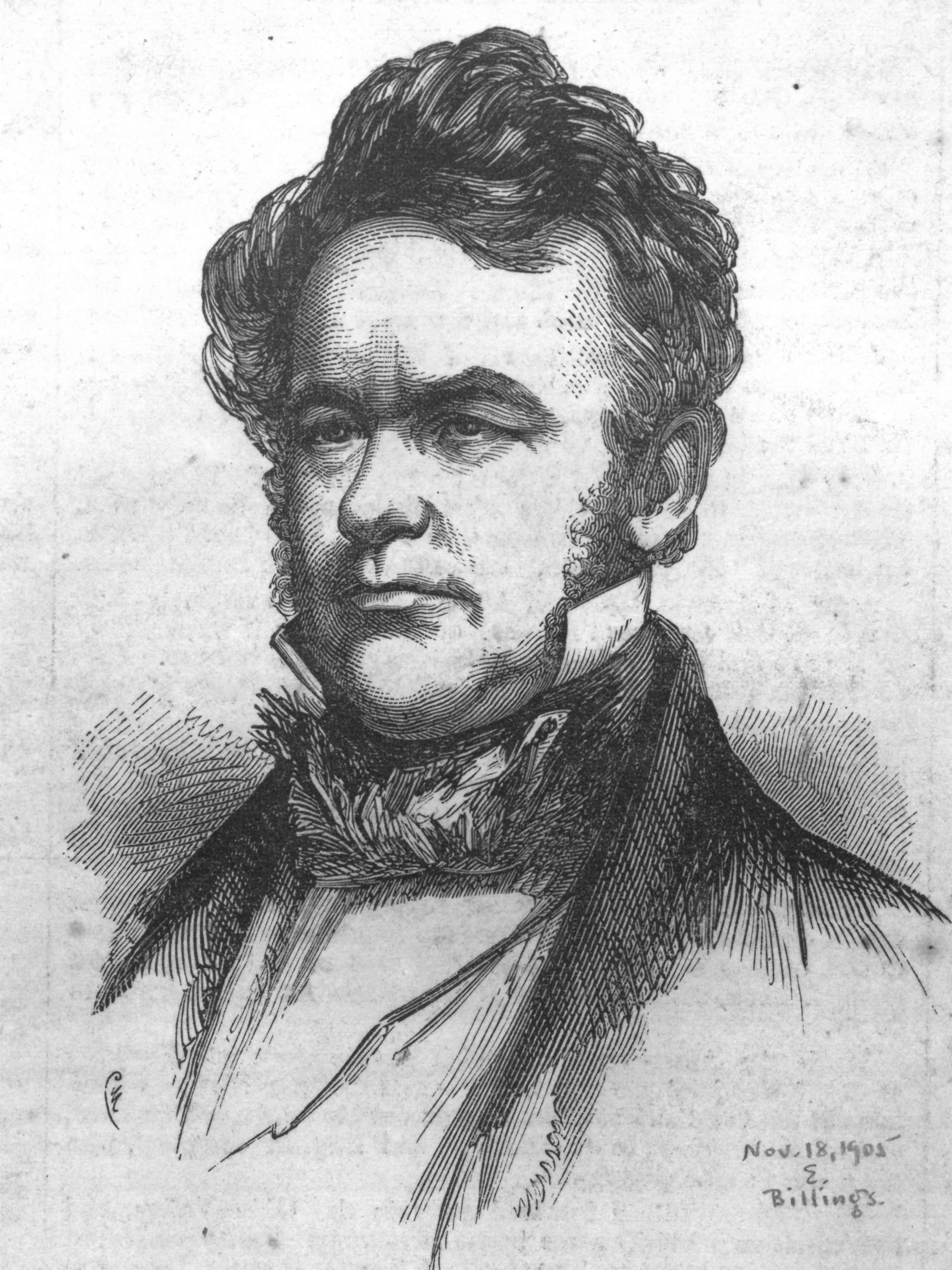

Candidate	Benjamin Seaver	Jerome V. C. Smith	Joseph Smith
Party	Union	Independent
Popular vote	6,018	2,736	889
Percentage	50.27%	41.94%	7.51%
Mayor before election
John P. Bigelow
Whig
Elected mayor
Benjamin Seaver
Union

The Boston mayoral election of 1852 saw the reelection of Benjamin Seaver to a second term. It was held on December 13, 1852.

== Candidates ==
Boston's Union Party renominated incumbent mayor Benjamin Seaver unanimously at their meeting. Jerome V. C. Smith was nominated at a meeting of politically independent citizens who put him forth as the "people's candidate".

- Benjamin Seaver (Union Party), incumbent mayor
- Jerome V. C. Smith, physician and candidate for mayor in 1851
- Joseph Smith

== Results ==
1852 Boston mayoral election
Party	Candidate	Votes	%
Union	Benjamin Seaver (incumbent)	6,018	50.27
Independent	Jerome V. C. Smith	5,021	41.94
	Joseph Smith	899	7.51
Scattering	Other	34	0.28
Total votes		11,972	100

== See also ==
- List of mayors of Boston, Massachusetts
