= 1844–45 Boston mayoral election =

Election in Massachusetts, United States

- December 9, 1844–February 21, 1845
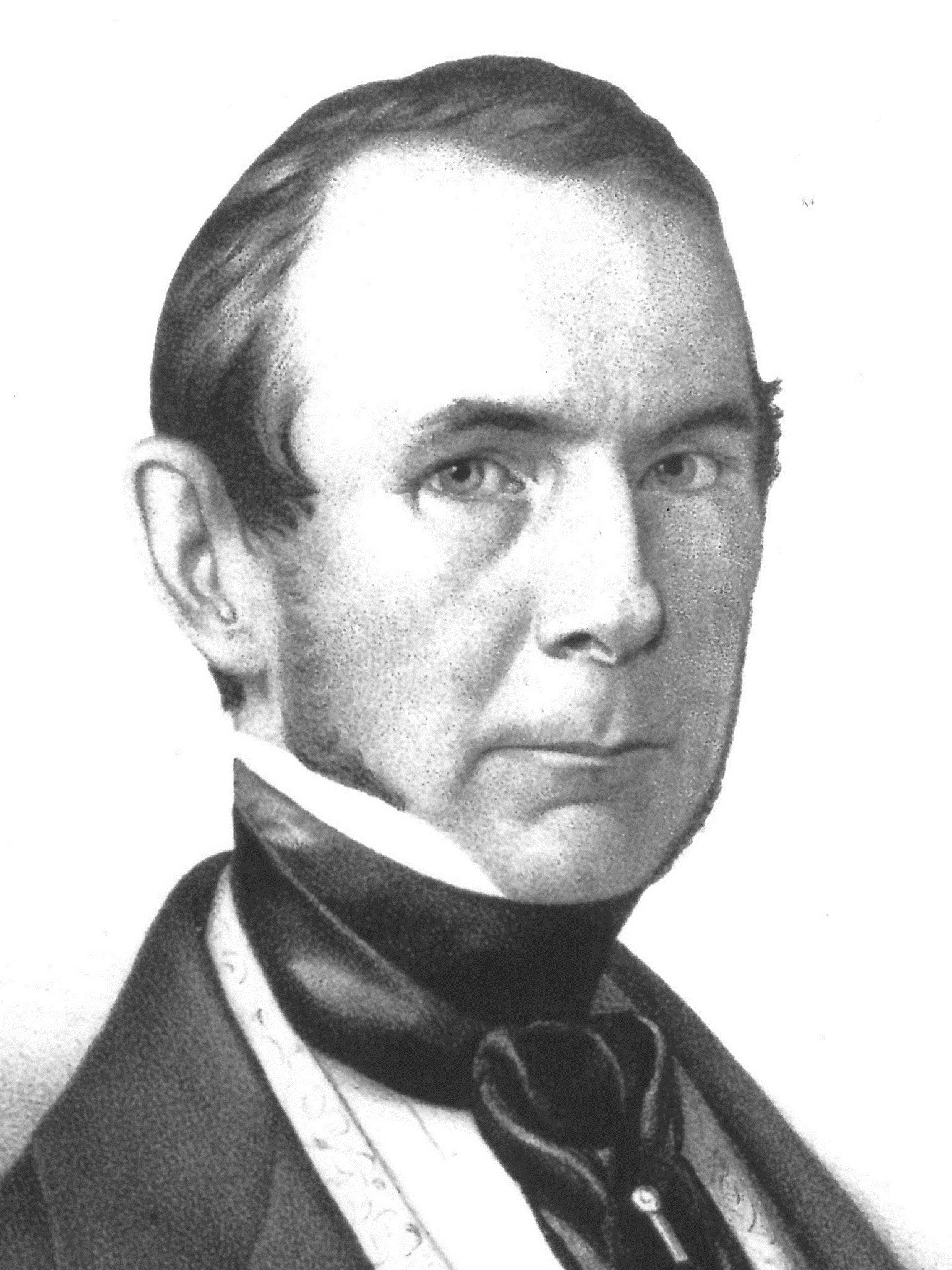

Candidate	Thomas Aspinwall Davis	William Parker
Party	Know Nothing	Whig
Popular vote	4,865	4,336
Percentage	50.93%	45.70%
Mayor before election
Martin Brimmer
Whig
Elected mayor
Thomas Aspinwall Davis
Know Nothing

The 1844–45 Boston mayoral election was held in eight rounds from December 9, 1844 through February 21, 1845. The eight ballot saw the election of Native American Party nominee Thomas Aspinwall Davis as mayor of Boston. Incumbent Whig Party mayor Martin Brimmer was not a candidate for reelection. The election took eight votes, as no candidate secured the needed majority in the first seven attempts.

== Background ==
The election marked the rise of the city's newly founded Native American Party (Know Nothing) organization. The election was characterized in part as a race between Presbyterians, largely regarded as backing the Native American Party cause, and the Unitarians, who were seen as backing the Whig Party. It was alternatively described as reflecting dividing lines between party-line Whigs, locofocos, nativists, and abolitionists.

== First vote ==
The first vote was held as scheduled on December 9.

=== Candidates ===
- Thomas Aspinwall Davis, businessman (Native American and American Republican)
- Adam W. Thaxter Jr., merchant (Democratic and Locofoco)
- Josiah Quincy Jr., former president of the Boston Common Council (Whig)

=== Results ===
The Boston Post noted that the results did not reflect the typical party-alignment in elections held in Boston. Since no candidate received a majority of the vote, there was no winner.

Boston mayoral election first vote (December 9, 1844)
Party	Candidate	Votes	%
Whig	Josiah Quincy Jr.	4,457	41.19
Know Nothing	Thomas Aspinwall Davis	4,017	37.12
Democratic	Adam W. Thaxter Jr.	2,115	19.55
Scattering	Other	232	21.44
Total votes		10,821	100

== Second vote ==
The second ballot was held December 23.

Coinciding with the second vote was a similar second vote for five seats on the Boston Board of Aldermen.

=== Candidates ===
- Thomas Aspinwall Davis, businessman (Native American and American Republican)
- Charles Gordon Greene, editor of The Boston Post (Democratic and Locofoco)
- Thomas Wetmore (Whig)

The Whig Party parted with Quincy as their nominee and instead nominated Thomas Wetmore for the second vote of the election. With Thaxter declining the Democratic Party's nomination, Charles Gordon Greene was nominated in his place.

=== Results ===
Boston mayoral election second vote (December 23, 1844)
Party	Candidate	Votes	%
Know Nothing	Thomas Aspinwall Davis	3,907	38.89
Whig	Thomas Wetmore	3,767	37.56
Democratic	Charles Gordon Greene	2,282	22.75
Scattering	Other	90	0.90
Total votes		10,030	100

== Third vote ==
The third ballot was held December 30.

Coinciding with the third vote was a similar third vote for five seats on the Boston Board of Aldermen.

=== Candidates ===
- Thomas Aspinwall Davis, businessman (Native American and American Republican)
- Charles Gordon Greene, editor of The Boston Post (Democratic and Locofoco)
- Thomas Wetmore (Whig)

=== Results ===
Boston mayoral election third vote (December 30, 1844)
Party	Candidate	Votes	%
Know Nothing	Thomas Aspinwall Davis	4,031	40.19
Whig	Thomas Wetmore	3,456	34.46
Democratic	Charles Gordon Greene	2,419	24.12
Scattering	Other	124	1.24
Total votes		10,046	100

== Fourth vote ==
The fourth vote was held January 13, 1845.

=== Candidates ===
- Thomas Aspinwall Davis, businessman (Native American and American Republican)
- Samuel Atkins Eliot, former mayor (Whig)
- Charles Gordon Greene, editor of The Boston Post (Democratic and Locofoco)

Wetmore declined to run again and the Whig Party instead nominated former mayor Samuel Atkins Eliot.

=== Results ===
Boston mayoral election fourth vote (January 13, 1845)
Party	Candidate	Votes	%
Know Nothing	Thomas Aspinwall Davis	3,993	40.65
Whig	Samuel Atkins Eliot	3,712	37.79
Democratic	Charles Gordon Greene	2,056	20.93
Scattering	Other	63	0.64
Total votes		9,824	100

== Fifth vote (January 20, 1845) ==
The fifth vote was held January.

A coinciding fifth vote was also held for the final two aldermanic seats, which saw victors emerge.

=== Candidates ===
- Thomas Aspinwall Davis, businessman (Native American and American Republican)
- William T. Eustis (Whig Young Men's)
- Peter T. Homer (Democratic and Locofoco)
- William Parker (Whig)

The previous round's Whig nominee, Eliot, declined to run again. In their place, the party nominated William Parker. Greene also declined to run again. He was replaced by Peter T. Homer. A meeting was held at which the Whig Young Men's nominated William T. Eustis. It was speculated this was done with hopes of having him be a spoiler candidate and split the Know Nothing vote to prevent a Davis victory.

=== Results ===
Boston mayoral election fifth vote (January 20, 1845)
Party	Candidate	Votes	%
Know Nothing	Thomas Aspinwall Davis	4,289	46.39
Democratic	Peter T. Homer	1,855	20.06
Whig Young Men's	William T. Eustis	1,503	16.26
Whig	William Parker	1,499	16.21
Scattering	Other	99	
Total votes		9,245	100

== Sixth vote (January 30, 1845) ==
The sixth vote was held January 30.

=== Candidates ===
- Thomas Aspinwall Davis, businessman (Native American and American Republican)
- Peter T. Homer (Democratic and Locofoco)
- William Parker (Whig)

=== Results ===
Boston mayoral election sixth vote (January 30, 1845)
Party	Candidate	Votes	%
Know Nothing	Thomas Aspinwall Davis	4,436	45.10
Whig	William Parker	3,851	39.15
Democratic	Peter T. Homer	1,513	15.38
Scattering	Other	37	0.38
Total votes		9,837	100

== Seventh vote ==
The seventh vote was held February 12.

By the time of the seventh vote, the Boston Tribune, a Whig newspaper, was conceding that they did not believe that their party did not stand a chance of ultimately prevailing in the mayor's race.

=== Candidates ===
- Thomas Aspinwall Davis, businessman (Native American and American Republican)
- Peter T. Homer (Democratic and Locofoco)
- William Parker (Whig)

=== Results ===
Boston mayoral election seventh vote (February 12, 1845)
Party	Candidate	Votes	%
Know Nothing	Thomas Aspinwall Davis	4,343	47.57
Whig	William Parker	3,341	36.59
Democratic	Peter T. Homer	1,430	15.66
Scattering	Other	16	0.18
Total votes		9,130	100

After the vote, a reporter wrote,

It is evident to close observers here, that the subject of religious opinion has much to do in the matter, or other word, that it is a contest in part between Orthodox and Unitarian sects. The former set have thrown their influence for the Natives and the latter for the regular Whig candidate. But for this unhappy division, the regular Whig ticket would have succeeded at the first trial. It is now confidently anticipated by all that the native candidate will be elected.

== Eighth vote ==
The eighth vote was held February 21.

The Democratic Party opted not to contest the eighth vote, leaving the vote to be a two-way race. Davis won and was elected mayor. He took the oath of office on February 27, 1845.

=== Candidates ===
- Thomas Aspinwall Davis, businessman (Native American and American Republican)
- William Parker (Whig)

=== Results ===
Boston mayoral election eighth vote (February 21, 1845)
Party	Candidate	Votes	%
Know Nothing	Thomas Aspinwall Davis	4,865	50.93
Whig	William Parker	4,366	45.70
Scattering	Other	322	3.37
Total votes		9,553	100

== Summary table of all votes ==
1844–1845 Boston mayoral election results
Vote round	Whig Party		Know Nothing		Democratic Party		Other candidates	
Vote round	Nominee	%	Nominee	%	Nominee	%	Candidate	%
1st	Josiah Quincy Jr.	41.19	Thomas Aspinwall Davis	37.12	Adam W. Thaxter Jr.	19.55	—N/a	—N/a
2nd	Thomas Wetmore	37.50	Thomas Aspinwall Davis	38.89	Charles Gordon Greene	22.72	—N/a	—N/a
3rd	Thomas Wetmore	34.46	Thomas Aspinwall Davis	40.19	Charles Gordon Greene	24.12	—N/a	—N/a
4th	Samuel Atkins Eliot	37.79	Thomas Aspinwall Davis	40.65	Charles Gordon Greene	20.93	—N/a	—N/a
5th	William Parker	16.21	Thomas Aspinwall Davis	46.39	Peter T. Homer	20.06	William T. Eustis	16.26
6th	William Parker	39.15	Thomas Aspinwall Davis	45.10	Peter T. Homer	15.38	—N/a	—N/a
7th	William Parker	36.59	Thomas Aspinwall Davis	47.57	Peter T. Homer	15.66	—N/a	—N/a
8th	William Parker	45.70	Thomas Aspinwall Davis	50.93	—N/a	—N/a	—N/a	—N/a

== See also ==
- List of mayors of Boston, Massachusetts
