= Benjamin Seaver =

American politician

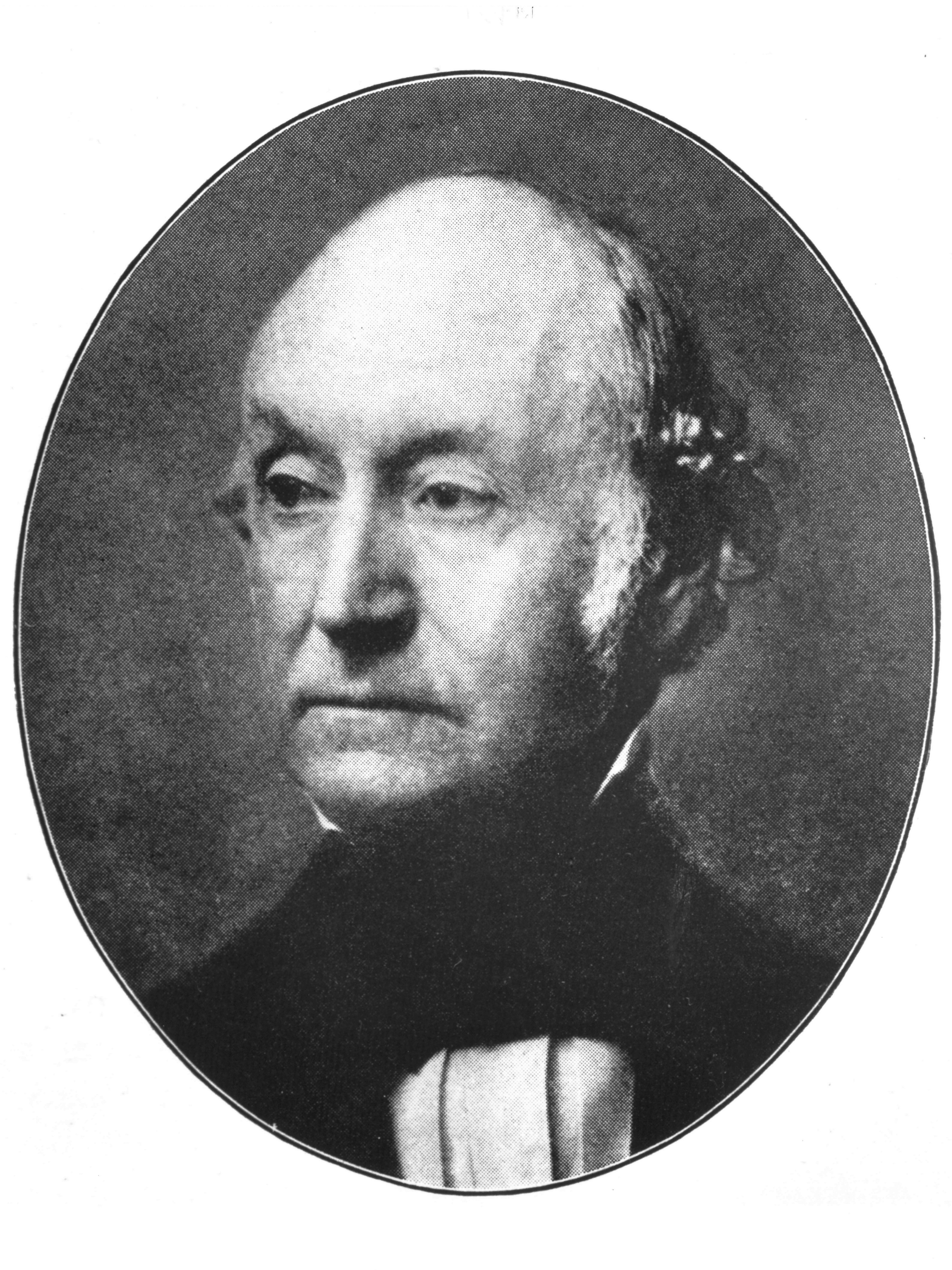

Mayor of Boston
- In office January 5, 1852 – January 2, 1854
- Preceded by: John P. Bigelow
- Succeeded by: Jerome V. C. Smith

President of the Boston Common Council
- In office July 1, 1847 – January 7, 1850
- Preceded by: George Stillman Hillard
- Succeeded by: Francis Brinley

Member of the Boston Common Council
- In office January 3, 1848 – January 7, 1850
- Constituency: Ward 4
- In office July 6, 1845 – January 3, 1848
- Constituency: Ward 5

Personal details
- Born: April 12, 1795 Roxbury, Massachusetts
- Died: February 14, 1856 (aged 60)
- Party: Whig
- Spouse: Sarah Johnson
- Children: Benjamin Francis (1820-1868), Henry Gardner (1822-1838), Mary Elizabeth (1825-?), Charles Milton (1829-?).
- Education: Roxbury Grammar School
- Occupation: Auctioneer

Benjamin Seaver (April 12, 1795 – February 14, 1856) was an American politician, serving as the thirteenth mayor of Boston, Massachusetts from January 5, 1852 to January 2, 1854.

== Early life ==
Seaver was born in Roxbury, Massachusetts In 1812 Seaver became an apprentice at the auction and commission store of Whitwell & Bond. In 1816 Seaver became a partner in the firm which was renamed Whitwell, Bond & Co. In 1818, Seaver purchased 5 shares of the Suffolk Bank, a clearinghouse bank on State Street in Boston.

Seaver married Sarah Johnson.

== Political career ==
=== City of Boston Common Council ===
Seaver was first elected to represent Boston's Ward 5 as a member of the Boston Common Council in 1845. He was reelected to the Common Council from Ward 5 in 1846 and 1847. In 1848 Seaver moved to Ward 4 and was subsequently elected as a councilor from the new ward in 1848 and 1849.

In July 1847 Seaver was elected as the president of the Common Council and held that position for the two and a half years that he remained on the City of Boston Common Council.

=== Massachusetts legislature ===
From 1846 to 1848 Seaver served as a member of the Massachusetts House of Representatives and in 1850 and 1851 he was elected to the Massachusetts Senate.

== See also ==
- Timeline of Boston, 1840s-1850s
- 1852 Boston mayoral election
- 1853–54 Boston mayoral election

Political offices
Preceded by John P. Bigelow	Mayor of Boston, Massachusetts; January 5, 1852 – January 2, 1854	Succeeded by Jerome V. C. Smith
Preceded by George Stillman Hillard	President of the Common Council of Boston, Massachusetts; July 1, 1847 – January 7, 1850	Succeeded by Francis Brinley
