= 1842 Boston mayoral election =

Election in Massachusetts, United States

- December 12, 1842
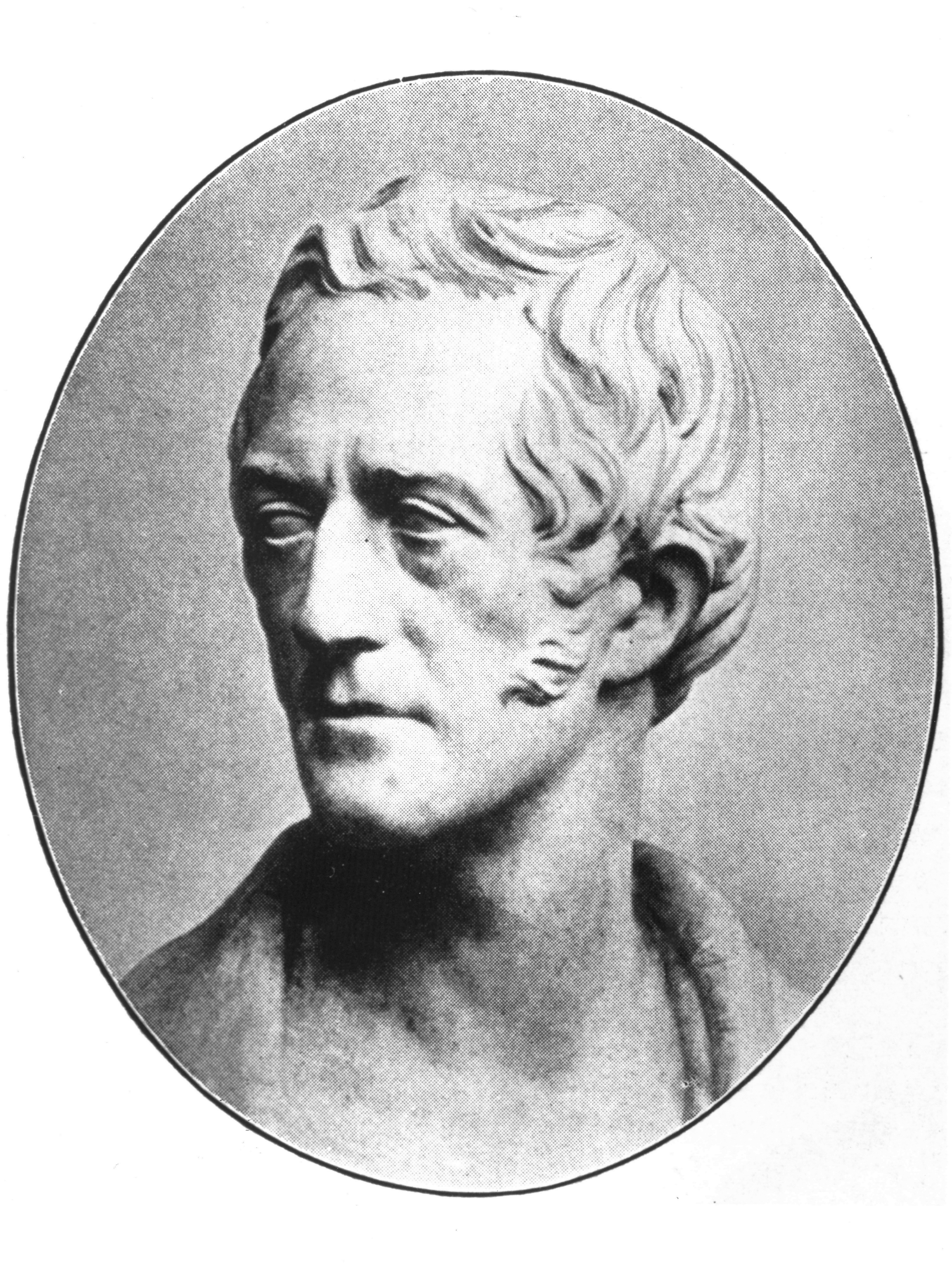

Candidate	Martin Brimmer	Bradford Sumner
Party	Whig	Democratic
Popular vote	5,084	2,340
Percentage	61.86%	28.47%
Mayor before election
Jonathan Chapman
Whig
Elected mayor
Martin Brimmer
Whig

The 1842 Boston mayoral election saw the election of Whig Party nominee Martin Brimmer. It was held on December 12, 1842. Whig Party incumbent Jonathan Chapman was not a nominee for reelection.

== Campaign ==
Brimmer was the Whig Party nominee while Sumner was the Democratic Party nominee. The Whigs did well in the coinciding municipal elections.

Sumner had run for mayor in 1839 and for the United States House of Representatives in both 1838 and 1839.

== Results ==
1842 Boston mayoral election
Party	Candidate	Votes	%
Whig	Martin Brimmer	5,084	61.86
Democratic	Bradford Sumner	2,340	28.47
Scattering	Other	795	9.67
Total votes		8,219	100

== See also ==
- List of mayors of Boston, Massachusetts
