= Martin Brimmer =

American businessman and politician

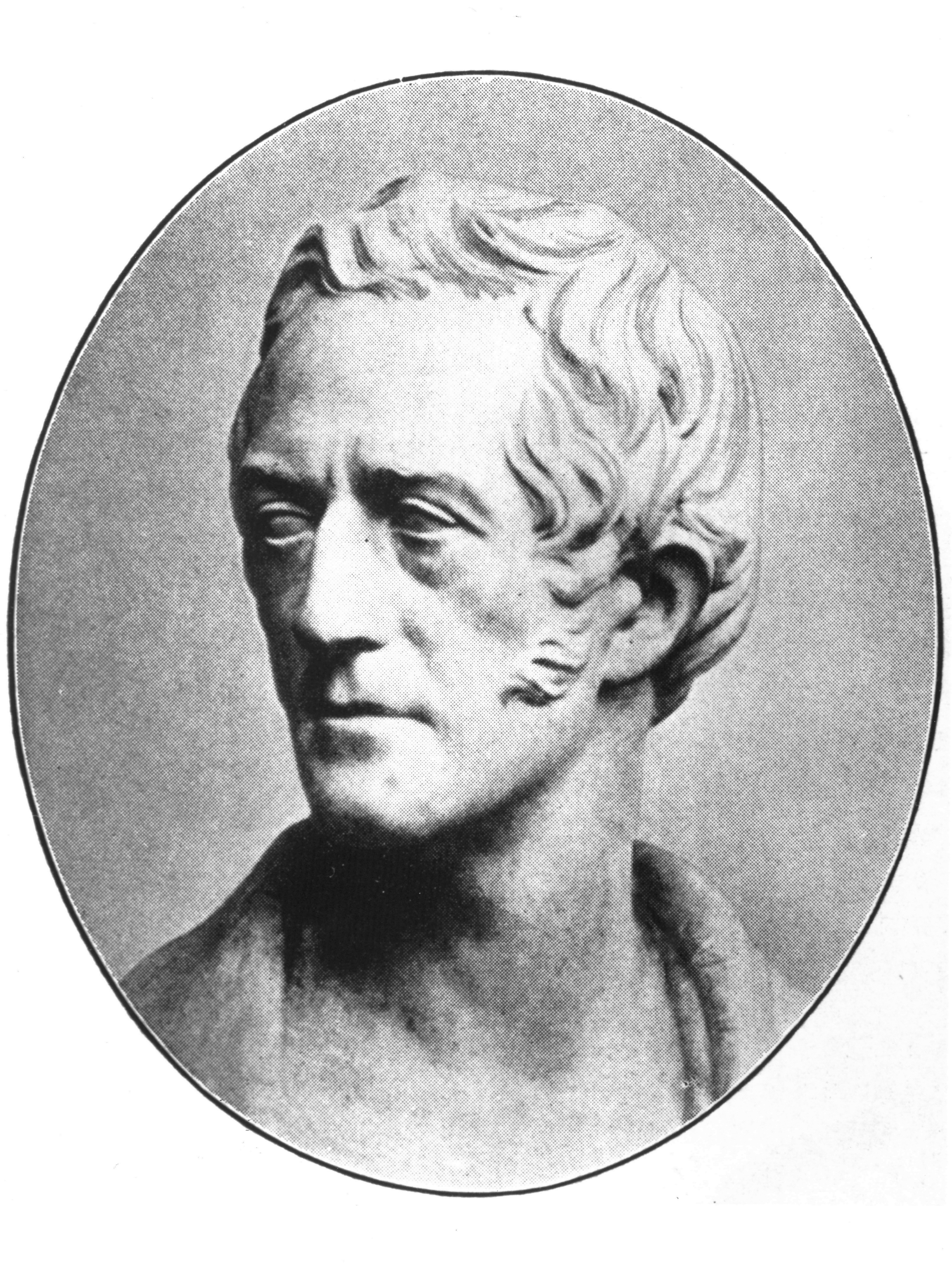

9th Mayor of Boston, Massachusetts
- In office January 2, 1843 – January 6, 1845
- Preceded by: Jonathan Chapman
- Succeeded by: Thomas Aspinwall Davis

Member of the Boston Board of Aldermen
- In office January 1, 1838 – January 7, 1839

Member of the Massachusetts House of Representatives
- In office 1838–1839

Personal details
- Born: June 8, 1793 Roxbury, Massachusetts
- Died: April 27, 1847 (aged 53)
- Party: Whig
- Children: Martin Brimmer
- Education: Harvard

Martin Brimmer (June 8, 1793 – April 25, 1847) was an American businessman and politician, who served in the Massachusetts House of Representatives, in the Boston Board of Aldermen, and as the mayor of Boston, Massachusetts.

== Early life ==
Brimmer was born in Roxbury, Massachusetts on June 8, 1793 to Martin, a merchant on Brimmer's T wharf, and Sarah (Watson) Brimmer.

== Education ==
Brimmer attended Harvard, graduating in 1814.

== Marriage ==
Brimmer married Harriet E Wadsworth of Geneseo, New York. They had one child, Martin Brimmer (1829–1896), an 1849 graduate of Harvard who served from 1859 to 1861 in the Massachusetts House of Representatives and was for 26 years the president of the Boston Museum of Fine Arts.

== Business career ==
Brimmer began his business career working with Isaac Winslow on Long Wharf. Later Brimmer ran a counting room on Brimmer's Wharf.

== Government service ==
Brimmer was a Member of the Boston Board of Aldermen from January 1, 1838 to January 7, 1839. Brimmer served in the Massachusetts House of Representatives in 1838 and 1839. On December 12, 1842, Brimmer was elected Mayor of Boston for 1843. On December 11, 1843, Brimmer was reelected mayor for the 1844 term.

== Death ==
Brimmer died on April 25, 1847.

== See also ==
- Timeline of Boston, 1830s–1840s

== Notes ==
Political offices
Preceded by Jonathan Chapman	Mayor of Boston, Massachusetts; January 2, 1843 – January 6, 1845	Succeeded by William Parker (acting); Thomas Aspinwall Davis
