= George Bruce Upton =

American politician (1804–1874)

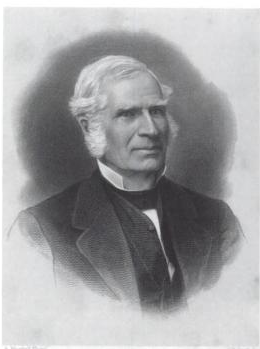

Member of the Massachusetts Executive Council
- In office 1853

Member of the Massachusetts Constitutional Convention of 1853
- In office 1853

Member of the Massachusetts Senate Nantucket and Dukes County District
- In office 1843
- Preceded by: Barker Burnell
- Succeeded by: Obed Barney

Member of the Massachusetts House of Representatives Nantucket District
- In office 1837

Personal details
- Born: October 11, 1804 Eastport, Maine
- Died: July 1, 1874 (aged 70) Boston, Massachusetts
- Party: Whig
- Children: George Bruce Upton
- Occupation: Dry goods clerk, Shipbuilder
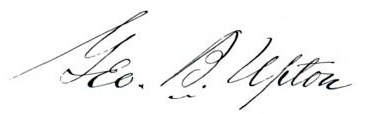
- Signature

George Bruce Upton (October 11, 1804 – July 1, 1874) was an American shipbuilder and politician who served in the Massachusetts House of Representatives, the Massachusetts Senate and the Massachusetts Executive Council.

== Early life ==
Upton was born on October 11, 1804, to Daniel Putnam Upton and Hannah (Bruce) Upton in Eastport, Maine (then a part of Massachusetts).

== Family life ==
Upton married Ann Coffin Hussey of Nantucket on May 2, 1826. They had eight children.

== Business career ==
Upton served as the treasurer of the Michigan Central Railroad for eight years.

== Public service ==
While he lived in Nantucket Upton was a member of the Massachusetts House of Representatives in 1837, and a member of the Massachusetts Senate in 1843. After he moved back to Boston Upton served as a member of the Massachusetts Executive Council in 1853, and as a member of the Massachusetts Constitutional Convention of 1853.

== Whig National Convention ==
Upton served as delegate to the Whig National Convention in 1844.
