= 1839 Boston mayoral election =

Election in Massachusetts, United States

- December 9, 1839
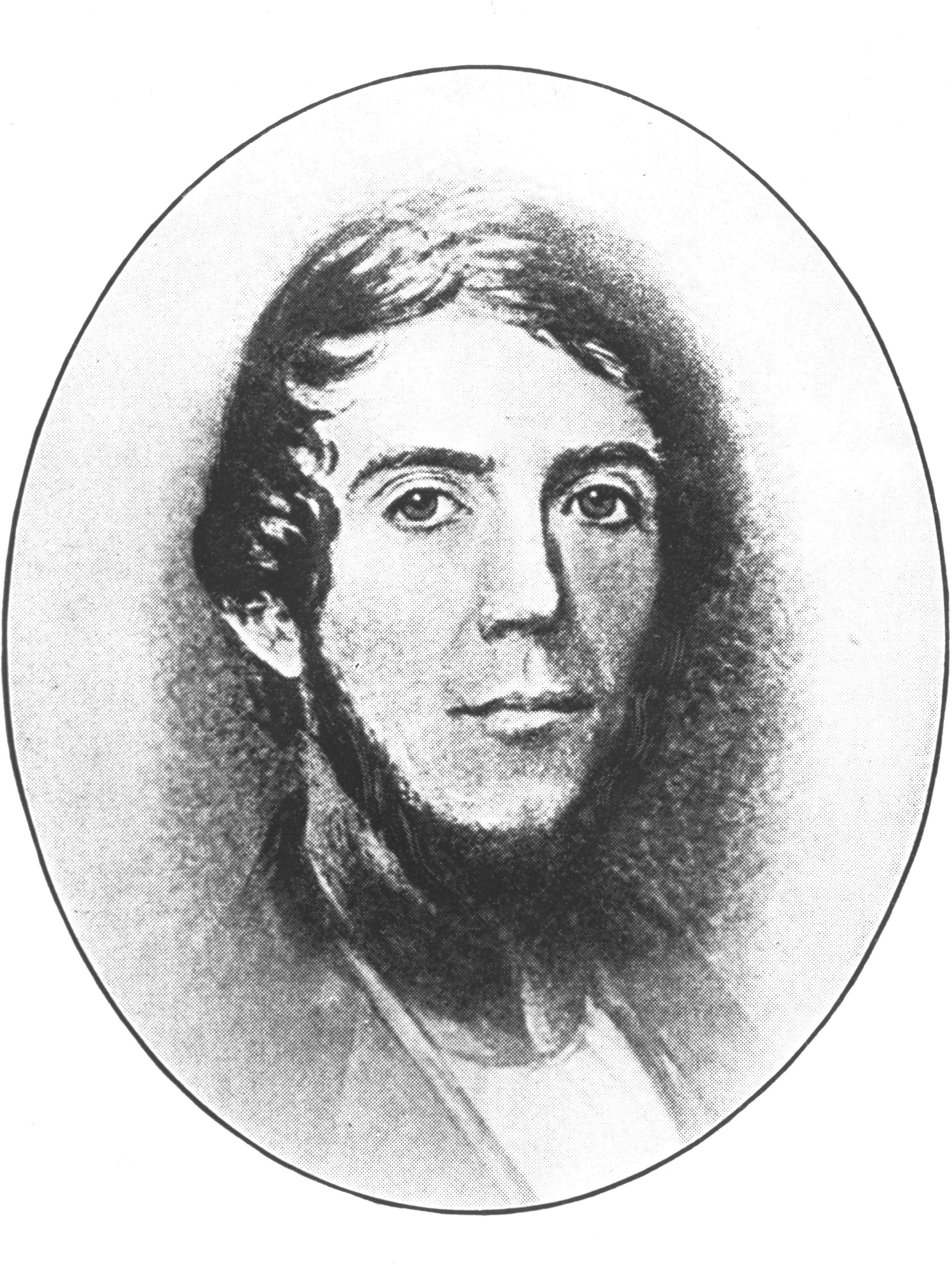

Candidate	Jonathan Chapman	Bradford Sumner
Party	Whig	Democratic
Popular vote	4,352	3,047
Percentage	58.27%	40.80%
Mayor before election
Samuel Atkins Eliot
Whig
Elected mayor
Jonathan Chapman
Whig

The 1839 Boston mayoral election saw the election of Whig Party nominee Jonathan Chapman. It was held on December 9, 1839. Whig Party incumbent Samuel Atkins Eliot was not a nominee for reelection.

== Campaign ==
Chapman was the Whig Party nominee. Bradford Sumner was the Democratic Party nominee. In the coinciding municipal elections, all Whig nominees for Boston Board of Aldermen won sizable victories.

== Results ==
1839 Boston mayoral election
Party	Candidate	Votes	%
Whig	Jonathan Chapman	4,352	58.27
Democratic	Bradford Sumner	3,047	40.80
Scattering	Other	70	0.94
Total votes		7,469	100

== See also ==
- List of mayors of Boston, Massachusetts
