= John P. Bigelow =

American politician

John Prescott Bigelow.
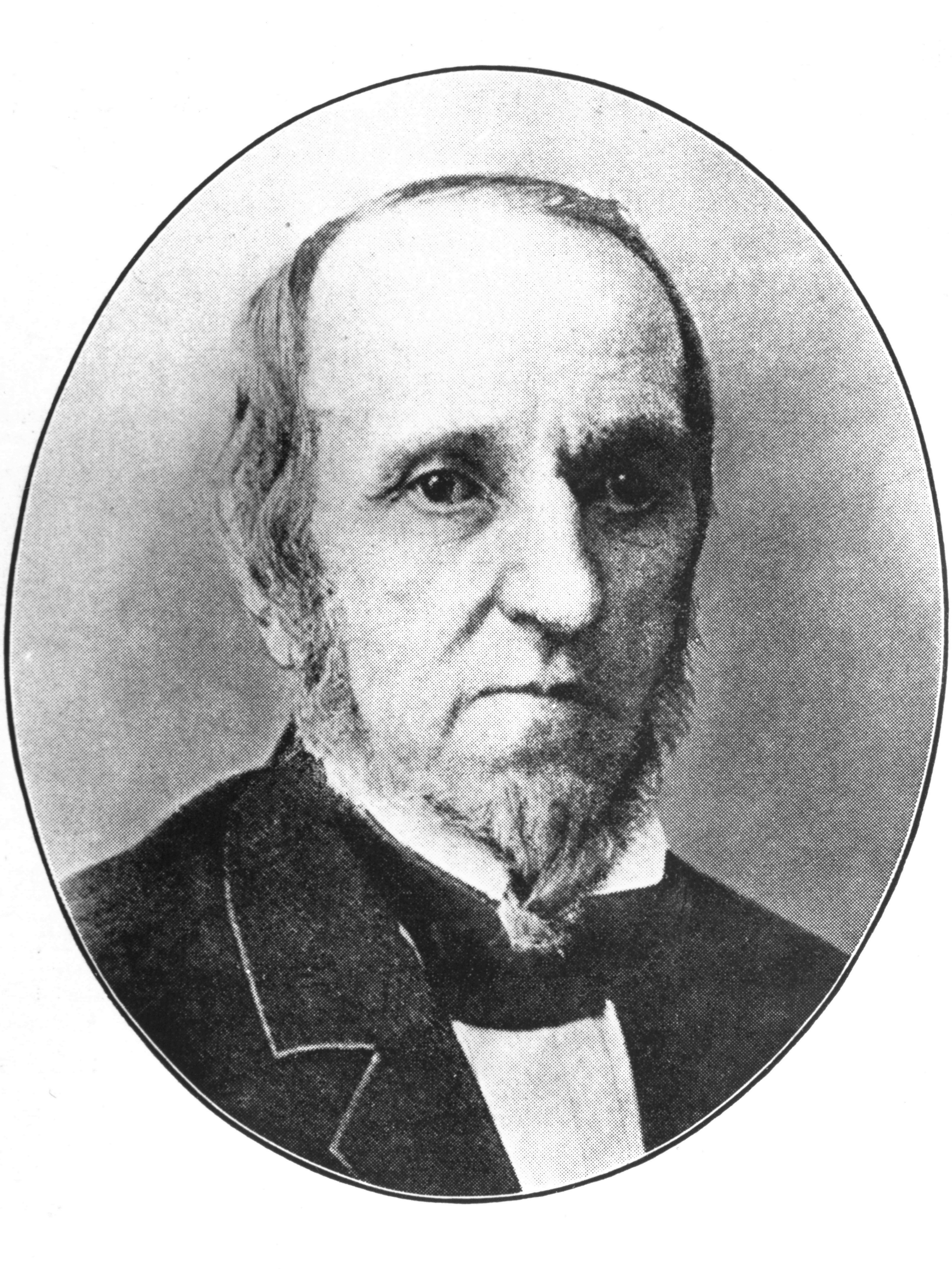

Mayor of Boston
- In office 1849–1851
- Preceded by: Josiah Quincy Jr. Benson Leavitt (acting)
- Succeeded by: Benjamin Seaver

Massachusetts Secretary of the Commonwealth
- In office 1836–1843
- Governor: Edward Everett; Marcus Morton; John Davis
- Preceded by: Edward D. Bangs
- Succeeded by: John A. Bolles

Member of the Massachusetts House of Representatives
- In office 1828–1836

President of the Boston Common Council
- In office January 2, 1832 – January 6, 1834
- Preceded by: Benjamin T. Pickman
- Succeeded by: Josiah Quincy Jr.

Member of the Boston Common Council from Ward 9
- In office 1827–1833

Personal details
- Born: August 25, 1797 Groton, Massachusetts
- Died: July 4, 1872 (aged 74)
- Party: Whig
- Spouse: Louisa Ann Brown
- Education: Harvard

John Prescott Bigelow (August 25, 1797 – July 4, 1872) was an American politician, who served as a member of the Massachusetts House of Representatives, Secretary of State of Massachusetts, and most prominently as the twelfth mayor of Boston, Massachusetts from 1849 to 1851. Bigelow was born in Groton, Massachusetts, in Middlesex County.

== Early life ==
Bigelow was the son of lawyer Timothy Bigelow. He studied law at Harvard College, graduating in 1815. On March 9, 1824, he married Louisa Ann Brown, and the following year their son, Prescott, was born. However, he died at a young age, and, in 1847, Louisa Ann Brown also died.

== Political Ascent ==
Bigelow's rise to political prominence began in 1828, when he was elected to the Massachusetts House of Representatives as a member of the Whig Party, serving in the State House until 1836, where he was a prominent member on several committees. He notably championed several causes, including reducing the total number of members of the Massachusetts House of Representatives, which at the time stood at over 700, and sponsoring and developing railroad legislation.

While in the State House, he was a member of the Common Council for Ward 9 in the City of Boston, a position to which he was elected to in 1832, and, in the following year, was elected President of the Council. In 1836, he was elected as Secretary of the Commonwealth, serving until 1843 when he became a member of the Executive Council under Governor George N. Briggs.

In 1848, Bigelow was elected Mayor of Boston, he was inaugurated the following year.

== Mayoral Years ==
During his three years as mayor, the City of Boston underwent significant structural changes, while simultaneously combating rising crime and an influx of Irish immigrants. Most significantly, by the end of his tenure, he would have laid the foundation for the construction of the Boston Public Library, the nation's first publicly funded library.

In his inaugural address, Bigelow made clear that he intended to run the city's finances as a fiscal conservative. He proclaimed, "Cut off every expense which is not absolutely necessary for the honor and interests of Boston. Commence no expensive projects, however alluring or desirable. . . consider not what we would like, but what we can afford!" Mayor Bigelow was alarmed by the city's high rate of taxation, which had been made necessary by its multiple public works projects. As a result, the wealthy often fled the city during the annual tax period, so as to not pay their taxes.

To combat this problem, the mayor focused on several high-profile public works projects that he claimed would save the city's taxpayers money and stem the outgoing flow of the rich. While calling education "the true oasis of our institutions, and the real secret of New England progress and power," he also dismissed the city's recent expenditure of tens of thousands of dollars on the building of new schools. Instead, he argued that the city's current school buildings, which he called "magnificent structures of the present period," should remain in use.

Bigelow also expressed dismay at the proposed expenditure of more than $150,000 to build a new jail. He argued that the city's one jail should be expanded. He did not want to give the impression that he was spending taxpayer dollars to enhance the lifestyle of the city's criminals. He argued that "society should not be expected to furnish costly accommodations for those who set its authority at naught." Constructing a new facility should not be "with reference to show." He further contended that a new jail should "never be other than a melancholy monument of the infirmities of our race, and it is not wise to whiten, or garnish, the sculpture of shame." Despite these protestations over the construction of the new correctional facility, during his three years as mayor, Bigelow would oversee the development of the city's new jail at a cost of $450,000.

In his inaugural address, Bigelow also briefed his citizens on the city's increasing crime rate and its seemingly dysfunctional police department, headed up by City Marshal, Francis Tukey. Bigelow pledged to scrutinize the department and provide oversight of its operations. However, instead of casting blame for the city's crime on the police department's tactics, or the lack thereof, he faulted immigrants and "the intemperate use of intoxicating liquors." He went on to call the city's rampant alcoholism an "evil."

The incoming mayor reassured his citizens that the city was stable. One of the prime improvements the city had made in recent years had been the construction of underground water pipes. At the time of his inauguration, the mayor estimated that about 60 miles of pipe had been laid underneath the city, providing water to over 5,000 houses and businesses. The total cost of this great water project, he projected, would amount $3.8 million. By the end of his administration, every section of the city was supplied with pure water. The entire cost of the water works project actually amounted to $4,321,000.

=== Cholera Epidemic ===
In his first term as mayor, Bigelow faced a major crisis. Cholera swept across the city at an alarming rate. It 1849 alone, it killed over 5,000 people out of a population of 130,000, or approximately 4 percent of the city's citizens. In response to the epidemic, the mayor blamed the deaths on "palpable indiscretions in diet, or intemperance." He also claimed that most—if not nearly all—of the deceased had been Irish immigrants. By subtracting the number of the city's Irish immigrants from its total population, he argued that Boston's mortality rate had not necessarily increased from the preceding years, nor was it decidedly different from that of small towns. What differentiated Boston from these small towns, Bigelow wrote, was "its throng of disabled mariners, destitute strangers, and reckless and dissolute persons from every clime." He asserted that the city had all of the necessary resources—clean water, proper sanitation, and an aggressive police force—to combat the causes that had led to the cholera outbreak. He predicted that Boston would not suffer nearly as badly as other major American cities.

Mayor Bigelow earned praise for his efforts to reduce the outbreak of cholera. On August 15, 1849, the Boston Evening Transcript, published an article which highlighted the mayor's actions to remove the infirm to hospitals and educate those who lived in the vicinities of the outbreak about its prevention. As a result of Bigelow's leadership, the article concluded that he was entitled "to the respect and gratitude of our citizens." He had become "a model mayor."

Bigelow's seemingly successful efforts in combating the city's cholera epidemic had enhanced his political profile, which led some of his supporters to nominate him to be his party's candidate for governor. Most party insiders, including the incumbent governor's supporters, were not amused. Bigelow published a note on September 11, 1850, stating that he had not been informed of his supporters' efforts and that he would not place his name into nomination, regardless of whether or not the incumbent placed his. Instead, he offered his full-fledged support to his party's nominee.

=== Irish Immigration ===
To fully appreciate the rapid transformation which Boston underwent in the mid-nineteenth century and to rightfully evaluate Bigelow's performance as mayor, it is important to emphasize how the Irish diaspora reshaped the City of Boston's societal structures. The Reverend Theodore Parker rather aptly commented that in a single decade the city had turned into "the Dublin of America."

While Bostonians had previously accepted new immigrants with open arms, particularly during the first influx of Irish in the 1820s, by the late 1840s and early '50s they had come to detest the "Famine Irish." In 1847 alone, more 37,000 new immigrants arrived in the city, most of whom came from Ireland. Previously, the city had been accepting, on average, only 5,000 new immigrants. The ships bringing the thousands who arrived in Boston Harbor on a daily basis came were euphemistically dubbed "coffin ships." The perception was that these Irish immigrants were weak and poor, starved and miserable, disease-ridden and confused.

Bostonians had been willing to support the Irish, as long as they had stayed in Ireland. Now that they had come to America's shores—and to the City of Boston particularly—Bostonians were incensed. Their reactions could be violent and inflammatory. The "Boston Daily Advertiser" wrote, "The increase in foreign-born pauperism in our midst is an evil."

Anti-Irish forces had a powerful spokesman in Mayor Bigelow, who argued that the invasion of immigrants to Boston was causing the city's widespread drunkenness and violence. He claimed that sympathetic judges were not handing down tougher sentences, charging that the Irish had easy access to pardons because their supporters included the city's influential, lenient, and more charitable members. Mayor Bigelow suggested that the city's powerful elites were siding with the Irish criminals over the innocent citizens of Boston.

Simon Schama in his book Dead Certainties characterizes the city of Boston during this time period as being in "trouble," and Mayor Bigelow as being "much given to jeremiads about the decay of morals and collapsing of good order occasioned by the new unwashed in his city". In response to the increasing Irish immigrant population, Bigelow once remarked, "Foreign paupers are rapidly accumulating on our hands." He told sympathetic taxpayers that large numbers of Irish immigrants were "aged, blind, paralytic, and lunatic immigrants who have become charges on our public charities." He further complained that they were living in "filth and wretchedness" and "foul and confined apartments."

That the new Irish immigrants could be blamed for nearly all of the city's ills was not lost on its native citizens. When one of the most well-known Boston Brahmins, George Parkman, disappeared, the police instinctively assumed that Irish immigrants were the culprits. City Marshal Francis Tukey was particularly suspicious of the allegation that on the night of Parkman's disappearance, an Irishman had paid for a one cent toll with a twenty dollar bill. As it turned out, another prominent Bostonian, John White Webster, was tried, convicted, and executed for the disappearance and murder of Parkman.

=== Shadrach Affair ===
Another famous case that occurred during Bigelow's tenure as mayor was the Shadrach Affair, which ignited a political and cultural firestorm of controversy, primarily because it involved the Fugitive Slave Law of 1850. Passed by the US Congress and signed by President Millard Fillmore, the law allowed federal marshals to capture slaves who had run away to non-slaveholding states, such as Massachusetts. That year, a slave, Shadrach Minkins, had escaped into Boston, where he came to reside and earn a living as a waiter. In February 1851, federal marshals arrested Shadrach. However, a group of 100–200 local blacks, most of whom were members of the Boston Vigilance Committee, forcibly freed Shadrach from Boston's courthouse, and Minkins fled to Canada.

Shadrach's escape was a political embarrassment to Mayor Bigelow. The U.S. Marshall had accused both the mayor and City Marshal Tukey of refusing his request for additional police officers to guard the courthouse, where Shadrach was detained. Bigelow was forced to defend himself against these accusations. He claimed that the U.S. Marshall had not requested security and that he, the mayor, had actually requested that Tukey send additional police to the courthouse in order to prevent disorder and chaos.

The uproar resulting from Shadrach's escape was intense. In response to the outrage, Fillmore issued a proclamation that the citizens of Boston, including the mayor, obey the law and aid in the recapturing of Shadrach. Secretary of State Daniel Webster, who hailed from Massachusetts, was particularly embarrassed by the event. In a March 10, 1851, letter to Bigelow, Webster excoriated the mayor's handling of the crisis and demanded that the mayor's office and the citizens of Boston be "ready to discharge the duties incumbent upon them, by the Constitution and the laws of the United States, faithfully and fearlessly, under all circumstances, whenever called upon by the proper authorities."

Anti-slavery forces applauded Shadrach's escape, but they were distressed by the knee-jerk reactions of Massachusetts' politicians, including Mayor Bigelow. The Liberator wrote several scathing editorials, blasting Bigelow's decision to cave in to the wishes of the president, his secretary of state, and the slave-holding politicians of the south. In one article, the newspaper wrote, "they plump themselves down upon their knees . . . explain 'Great is Fillmore, and Webster is his prophet, we have deserved it all,' and hold up their cheeks, both sides at once, to be smitten and spit upon."

That the Mayor of Boston would be hostile to the freedom and liberty of a slave seems contradictory to understanding the history of relations between the North and the South in ante-bellum America. However, "the year 1851 still found the bulk of Boston respectability solidly arrayed against the 'fanaticism' which proposed to disregard the fundamental fact of private property in the interests of an impracticable ideal."

The mayor and the citizens of Boston would be tested once again only a few months later. In April 1851, another fugitive slave, Thomas Simms, was captured by authorities in a hotel where he was working as a waiter. This time, Mayor Bigelow acted promptly and forcefully, writing to the colonel in charge of the state militia, "Now therefore, I command you that you cause one or more companies of your Regiment armed and equipped with ammunition, as the law directs, and with proper officers either attached to the troops or detailed by you to parade at said Boston on this and every subsequent day and night until further orders from me at Faneuil Hall." After being incarcerated for several days, Simms was escorted by more than 100 police officers to a boat in Boston harbor and returned to his master.

The reactions to the Fugitive Slave Law of 1850 intensified after Bigelow's terms as mayor. Over the course of the next three years, sentiment grew so heated that Anthony Burns, the last escaped slave to leave Boston under the law, cost the city more than $40,000 and the life of one police officer.

=== Bigelow-Tukey Riot ===
Relations between Mayor Bigelow and Secretary of State Daniel Webster did not improve after the Shadrach Affair. In 1850, Bigelow had been scheduled to meet with George Thompson, a famous British abolitionist, who was holding a meeting at Faneuil Hall. When protesters interrupted the meeting by cheering for Webster, the police, acting under instructions from the mayor, did nothing to stop the disturbance. The incident became known as the Bigelow-Tukey Riot.

A year later, when Daniel Webster petitioned the Boston Board of Aldermen to hold a reception at Faneuil Hall, his permit was denied. Mayor Bigelow and members of the Board all feared that a disturbance similar to the one that had erupted the year prior would occur. A political backlash quickly brewed. To resolve matters, Bigelow formally sent a committee to Webster to personally invite him to speak at Faneuil Hall. Webster promptly declined the invitation, arguing that it was no longer convenient for him to attend. In that year's elections, Bigelow was defeated, no doubt because of his handling of the Shadrach Affair and his public rebuke of Webster.

== Boston Public Library ==
The crowning achievement of Bigelow's tenure as mayor and during his years in retirement was his support of the Boston Public Library, the first publicly funded municipal building in the United States. The initial money donated to support the library was called the "Bigelow Fund." To honor the mayor for his services to the city during the cholera epidemic of 1849, a group of citizens proposed to raise funds to purchase a silver vase. Bigelow declined their gift, and instead asked that the cost of the vase, which was valued at over $1,000, be contributed to a fund for the library. In that year he also accepted a donation of books to the library, saying, "They are treasured not only as the gift of an illustrious people, but as the basis and no insignificant portion of a free municipal library, which we are taking active measures to establish."

In the last year of his administration, the mayor referred to the proposed library in his address to the city. He informed members of the City Council and Boston's citizens, "I commend the subject to your favorable consideration, and trust that an appropriation will be made, worthy of a project which has an auspicious bearing, prospectively, upon the moral and intellectual character of the people of Boston."

After his terms as mayor, Bigelow was selected to be a member of the Boston Public Library's Board. Its president was Governor Edward Everett. Bigelow served on its board until January 1869, when he resigned for health reasons. The Mayor of Boston at the time, Nathaniel B. Shurtleff, in accepting Bigelow's resignation, said that Bigelow "had ever been an ardent friend of the Library" and expressed "great regret that his feeble health demanded the severance of the tie which had for so long a time connected him with this and other branches of the City Government."

== Honors ==
Elected a member of the American Antiquarian Society in 1843, and chosen to serve on its board of councilors from 1854 to 1868.

== See also ==
- Timeline of Boston, 1820s-1850s
- 1848 Boston mayoral election
- 1849 Boston mayoral election
- 1850 Boston mayoral election

== Notes ==
Political offices
Preceded by Josiah Quincy Jr.	Mayor of Boston, Massachusetts; 1849–1851	Succeeded by Benjamin Seaver
Preceded by Edward D. Bangs	Secretary of the Commonwealth of Massachusetts; 1836–1843	Succeeded by John A. Bolles
Preceded by Benjamin T. Pickman	President of the Boston, Massachusetts; Common Council; January 2, 1832 – January 6, 1834	Succeeded by Josiah Quincy Jr.
