= Brighton Allston Congregational Church =

Historic church in Massachusetts, United States

- U.S. National Register of Historic Places
- U.S. Historic district – Contributing property
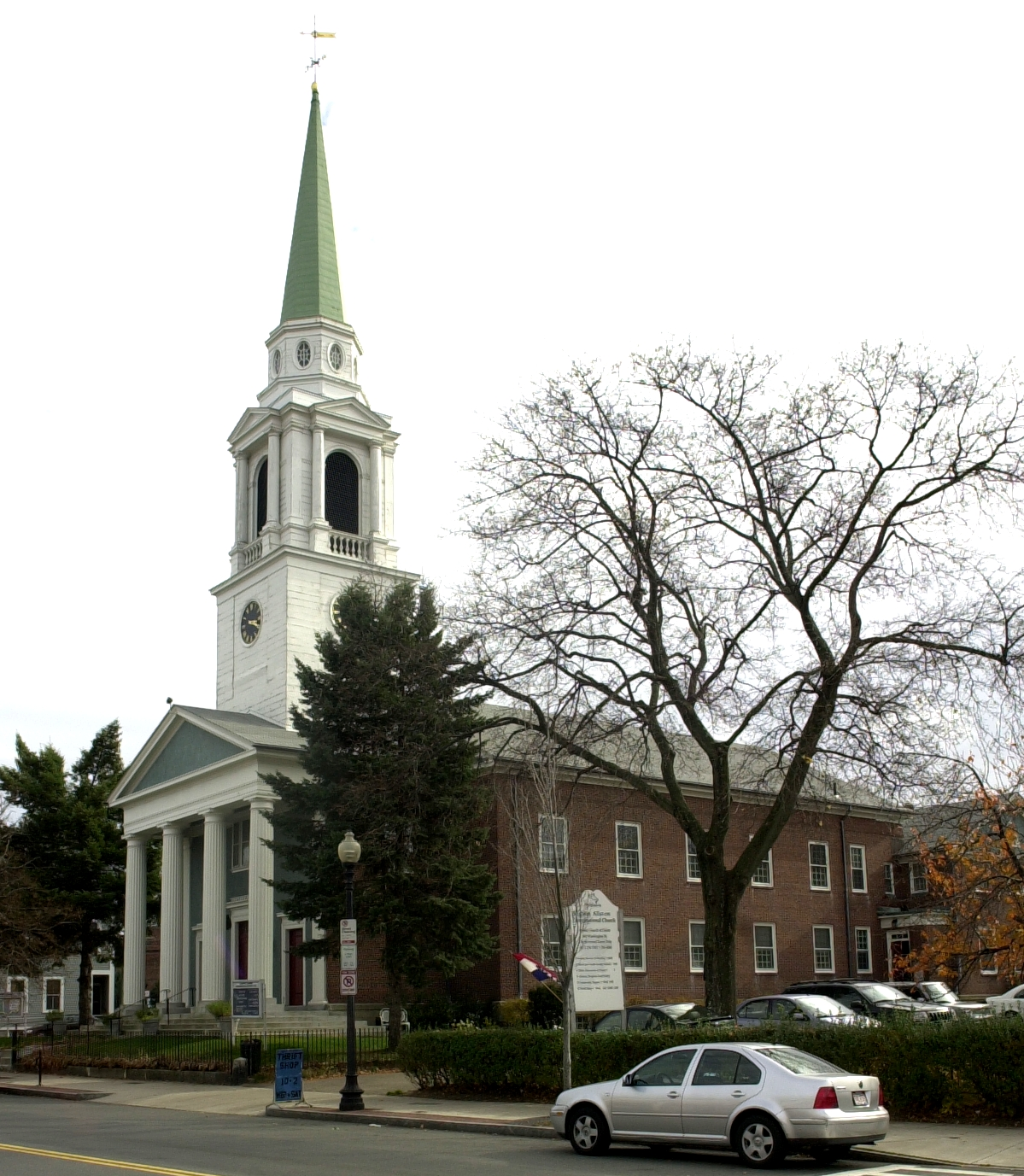

- Location within Massachusetts Location within the United States
- Location: Boston, Massachusetts
- Coordinates: 42°20′56.1″N 71°9′18.7″W
- Area: less than one acre
- Built: 1922
- Built by: C. S. Allen & Company
- Architect: Blackall, Clapp & Whittemore
- Architectural style: Colonial Revival
- Part of: Brighton Center Historic District (ID01000088)
- NRHP reference No.: 97000920

Significant dates
- Added to NRHP: August 21, 1997
- Designated CP: February 20, 2001

Brighton Allston Congregational Church, known before 2003 as the Brighton Evangelical Congregational Church, is a historic church located at 404 Washington Street in the center of Brighton, a neighborhood of Boston, Massachusetts.

== History and architecture ==
The congregation was established via a schism from Brighton's first congregation. This congregation, incorporated in 1783 when Brighton was part of Cambridge, had taken the Unitarian position during the Unitarian controversy. In 1827 a group of 25 members left the church and established the Brighton Evangelical Congregational Church, which was organized on Trinitarian lines. They built their first building the same year, and replaced it with a Gothic Revival building in 1868. This was destroyed by fire in 1921.

The current church building was designed by architects Blackall, Clapp & Whittemore and built by contractors C. S. Allen & Company in 1922. Colonial Revival in style, it has a pedimented entry portico with fluted Roman Doric columns. It was built on the foundation of the previous church to stand at the site.

Two additional churches were formed out of the Brighton church. These were the Allston Congregational Church, established in Allston in 1886, and the Faneuil Congregational Church, established in Oak Square in 1917. In 2003 the Allston church was merged back into the Brighton church, forming the present Brighton Allston Congregational Church.

The church was listed on the National Register of Historic Places in 1997 under its now former name.

== See also ==
- National Register of Historic Places listings in southern Boston, Massachusetts
