= Homer Rogers =

American politician

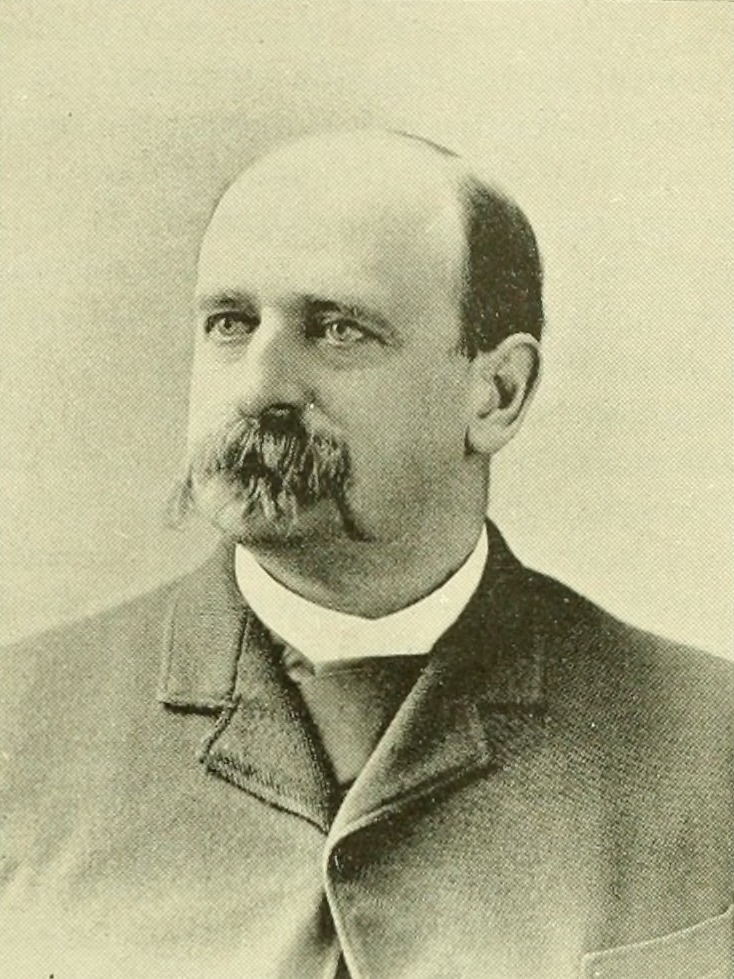
- Rogers, circa 1892

Chairman of the Boston Board of Aldermen
- In office 1889
- Preceded by: Charles Hastings Allen
- Succeeded by: William Power Wilson

Member of the Boston Board of Aldermen
- In office 1889–1891

Personal details
- Born: October 11, 1840 Sudbury, Massachusetts
- Died: November 10, 1907 (aged 67) Allston
- Party: Republican
- Spouse: Ellen E. Perry (1868–1907; his death)
- Education: Williams College

Homer Rogers (October 11, 1840 – November 10, 1907) was an American businessman and politician who served on the Boston Board of Aldermen and was the Republican nominee in the 1892 Boston mayoral election.

== Early life ==
Rogers was born on October 11, 1840, in Sudbury, Massachusetts, to Walter and Emily Rogers. His father was a direct descendant of John Rogers and his mother was a descendant of Peregrine White. He grew up on a farm and attended village school and the Wadsworth Academy. In 1862 he graduated from Williams College. While at Williams, Rogers also taught and served as principal of the Sanderson Academy in Ashfield, Massachusetts. After graduation, Rogers enlisted in the Union Army. In the fall of 1862 he went to the front as a sergeant in Company F, 45th Massachusetts Infantry Regiment. He saw combat in four battles around New Bern, North Carolina. After his term of service expired in 1863, Rogers served in the United States Christian Commission and resumed teaching. He spent a year teaching at the Douse Academy and from 1864 to 1866 was the principal of Natick High School.

== Business career ==
In 1867, Rogers, Samuel B. Rogers, Stephen Moore, and two Edwards brothers founded Rogers, Edwards, & Company, a leatherboard manufacturing business based in South Sudbury. The following year, the Edwardses were bought out and the business became S. B. Rogers and Company. In 1875, the Rogerses, Moore, and Emery Andrews organized the Mousam Manufacturing Company to manufacture leatherboard in Kennebunk, Maine. In 1881, Mousam Manufacturing Company purchased Leatheroid and organized a separate company, the Leatheroid Manufacturing Company. In 1891, the Mousam Manufacturing Company and the Leatheroid Manufacturing Company along with Harwood Manufacturing Company of Leominster, Massachusetts, the Towne Manufacturing Company of Boston, Massachusetts, and the Clegg and Fisher Mill at Lawrence, Massachusetts, were merged into a new company known as the Consolidated Fibre Board and Leatheroid Company.

In 1893, Rogers and S. Herbert Howe took over ownership of the Wayside Inn made famous by Henry Wadsworth Longfellow's Tales of a Wayside Inn. Rogers was the first person outside of the Howe family to own the Inn, which was built after King Philip's War. Howe and Rogers spent a considerable amount of money renovating and improving the building. In 1897 the pair sold the Inn to Boston businessman Edward Lemon.

Rogers also served as president of the National Market Bank and the Allston Co-Operative Bank and a trustee of the Home Savings Bank.

== Personal life ==
On January 15, 1868, he married Ellen E. Perry of South Natick. They had six sons and one daughter. In the 1880s the family moved to Boston's Allston neighborhood. A Congregationalist, Rogers was instrumental in the formation of the Allston Congregational Church.

== Political career ==
In 1888, Rogers was elected to the Boston Board of Aldermen. He was reelected in 1889 and 1890 and served as chairman in 1889. In 1891, Rogers lost the Republican nomination for Mayor of Boston to Horace G. Allen, receiving 95 votes to Allen’s 144 at the Republican city convention. In 1892, Rogers was uncontested for the Republican nomination for Mayor. He lost the general election to incumbent Democrat Nathan Matthews Jr. 60% to 40%.

== Death ==
Rogers died on November 10, 1907, at his home in Allston. His sons took over the National Fibre Board Company, which changed its name in 1918 to Rogers Fibre Company.
