= Horace G. Allen =

American politician

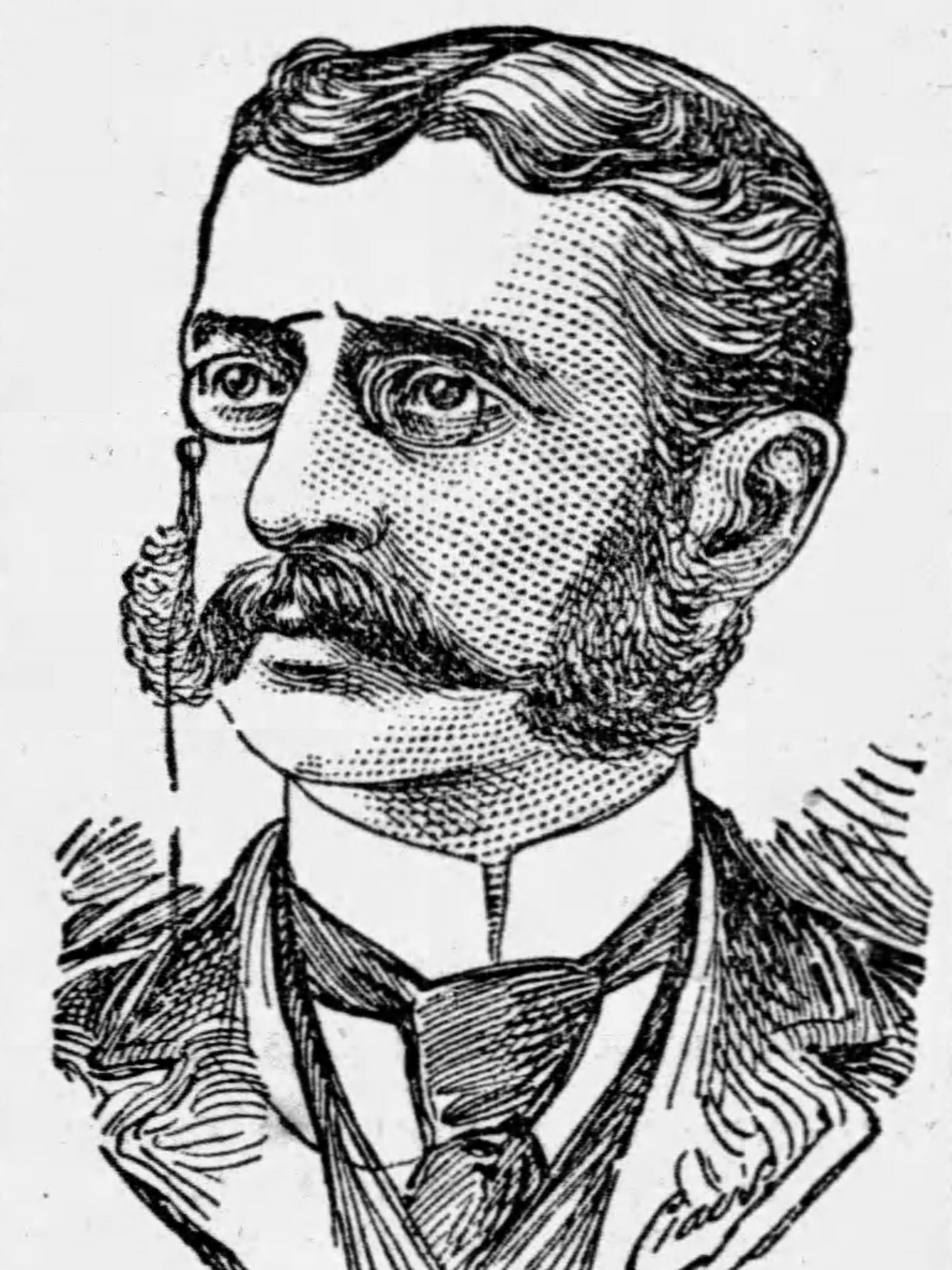
- Illustration of Allen circa 1891

Member of the Boston Transit Commission
- In office 1896–1918

Member of the Boston Board of Aldermen
- In office 1895–1896

President of the Boston Common Council
- In office 1889–1890
- Preceded by: David F. Barry
- Succeeded by: David F. Barry

Member of the Boston Common Council from the 21st Ward
- In office 1888–1891

Personal details
- Born: July 27, 1855 Jamaica Plain
- Died: February 12, 1919 (aged 63) Roxbury
- Party: Republican
- Spouse: Grace D. Chamberlain (1881–1919; his death)
- Education: Harvard Law School
- Occupation: Attorney

Horace Gwynne Allen (July 27, 1855 – February 12, 1919) was an American lawyer and politician.

== Early life ==
Allen was born on July 27, 1855, in Jamaica Plain to Stephen M. and Ann M. Allen. Allen attended Boston public schools and graduated from Harvard Law School in 1876. He was admitted to the Suffolk County, Massachusetts, bar on February 5, 1877.

== Personal life ==
In 1881, Allen married Grace Dupee Chamberlain, the only daughter of Fanny and Joshua Chamberlain to survive into adulthood. Allen's father was a lifelong friend of Fanny Chamberlain. Horace and Grace Allen had three daughters, Eleanor, Beatrice, and Rosamund. Grace was crippled following a car accident in 1910.

== Political career ==
Allen was elected to the Boston Common Council, and served from the January 2, 1888, start of the 1888 legislative session until the end of the 1891 legislative session. In 1889 he was elected council president by a 37 to 36 vote. He was reelected president in 1890. The Democrats had a majority on the council in 1891 and elected a member of their party as president. In 1891, Allen defeated Homer Rogers 144 to 95 at the Republican city convention to win the Republican nomination for Mayor of Boston. He lost the 1891 Boston mayoral election to Democratic incumbent Nathan Matthews Jr. 63% to 36%. Allen considered running in 1892, but withdrew from consideration shortly before the party convention. In 1895 and 1896, Allen served on the Boston Board of Aldermen. In 1896, Allen was appointed to the Boston transit commission by acting governor Roger Wolcott. He remained on the commission until 1918. Allen died on February 12, 1919.
