= Moody Merrill =

American businessman, politician, and fugitive

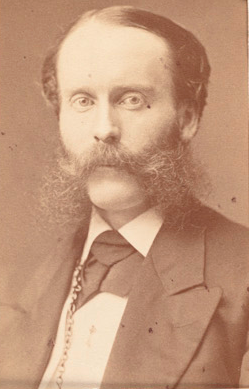

Member of the Massachusetts Senate for the 1st Norfolk District
- In office 1873–1874
- Preceded by: James Scollay Whitney
- Succeeded by: Albert Palmer

Member of the Massachusetts House of Representatives
- In office 1869–1871

Member of the Boston School Committee
- In office 1865–1874

Personal details
- Born: June 27, 1836 Campton, New Hampshire
- Died: December 24, 1903 (aged 67) Silver City, New Mexico
- Party: Republican
- Spouse(s): Martha M. Burgess (1860–1892; her death); Callie Smith (1895–1903; his death)

Moody Merrill (June 27, 1836 – December 24, 1903) was an American politician, businessman, and fugitive. He served in both houses of the Massachusetts General Court, was president of the Highland Street Railway, helped organize the Boston Consolidated Street Railway, and defeated incumbent Thomas N. Hart to become the Republican nominee in the 1890 Boston mayoral election. In 1893, financial and legal difficulties led him to flee Boston and live under an assumed name in Silver City, New Mexico. He was arrested in 1903, but fled before his trial began. He died before the charges against him could be resolved.

== Early life ==
Merrill was born on June 27, 1836 Campton, New Hampshire. He was the ninth of 14 children born to Winthrop and Martha (Noyes) Merrill. He attended local schools and the Thetford Academy, Vermont. He taught in Ellsworth, New Hampshire in 1856 and Thornton, New Hampshire in 1857. Merrill moved to Boston's Roxbury neighborhood in 1859. On May 10, 1860, Merrill married Martha M. Burgess, the widow of his older brother Jeremiah. They had one son, Winthrop Minot Merrill. Martha Burgess Merrill died on June 8, 1892.

== Legal career ==
In December 1859, Merrill entered the law office of William Minot. He was admitted to the Suffolk County, Massachusetts bar on January 7, 1863, and began practicing law. In 1867, Merrill was a junior member on the defense team for John Moran, who had been indicted for murder. Moran was found guilty but Merrill, who disagreed with how the defense had been handled by his superiors, brought the case before the Governor and the Massachusetts Governor's Council. Although the council had previously denied commutation based on the defense presented at trial, they unanimously commuted the sentence from death to life imprisonment after hearing Merrill's argument. Merrill was able to get Moran a pardon several years later from a different Council.

== Early political career ==
From 1865 to 1874, Merrill served on the Boston School Committee. From 1869 to 1871, Merrill was a member of the Massachusetts House of Representatives. In 1873 and 1874 he represented the 1st Norfolk District in the Massachusetts Senate. In 1874, Merrill, who was chairman of the committee on the state constabulary, passed legislation abolishing the agency over the veto of acting governor Thomas Talbot. Merrill's presentation was so persuasive that Senator Nathaniel P. Banks, who had spoken against the bill, voted in favor of it after hearing Merrill. Merrill also served as chairman of the committee in charge of memorial services for Charles Sumner. Merrill pushed for the creation of the Boston park system and petitioned the city council for many years for the purchase of land that became Franklin Park.

== Business career ==
Merrill was the founding president of the Highland Street Railway, which received its charter on April 12, 1872, and opened on October 24, 1872. Five miles of road and two large stables were constructed for the horse railroad. In 1886, Merrill was able to secure passage of legislation allowing the consolidation of the Highland Street Railway and the Middlesex Railroad. Charles Edward Powers of the Middlesex Railroad was elected president of the new Boston Consolidated Street Railway and Merrill became its vice president. With the merger, the new company became the second largest street railway operating in Boston (after the Metropolitan Railroad). In 1888 the Consolidated Railway was again consolidated, this time into the West End Street Railway.

Merrill purchased land opposite Franklin Park and opened an amusement park called Oakland Garden. The venture was unsuccessful and Merrill founded the Franklin Park Land Company to manage the land formerly occupied by Oakland Garden as well as an adjoining lot that stretched to the Mt. Bowdoin Station.

Merrill was also the proprietor of the Hotel Bellevue in Boston and was president of the Magneso-Calcite Company, a fire proofing business.

== Campaigns for mayor ==
In 1888, Merrill was a candidate for Mayor of Boston. He lost the Republican nomination to former alderman Thomas N. Hart 165 votes to 133 at the city Republican convention. Hart went on to win that year's mayoral election. At the 1889 convention, Merrill, who was mentioned as a possible challenger to Hart, moved that Hart be unanimously declared the nominee for Mayor. In 1890, Merrill defeated Hart 167 votes to 131 to win the Republican nomination for mayor. During the campaign, Merrill's involvement with the Tremont Water Meter Company came under scrutiny. Tremont provided defective water meters to the city of Boston after Merrill came on as a director and helped secure the contract to be the exclusive provider of water meters to the city. Merrill lost the 1890 Boston mayoral election to Democrat Nathan Matthews Jr. 59% to 37%. Merrill indicated that the lack of support from Hart aided in his loss.

== Legal issues ==
By 1892, Merrill was heavily invested in the Boston Gas Company, a venture that provided a profit for the majority shareholder, J. Edward Addicks, but not for Merrill and the other Boston men who invested in it. According to Merrill, this put him in a desperate position. The Panic of 1893 left him financially devastated and that May it was found that he was insolvent. On June 7, 1893, the Boston Daily Globe reported that he had a total of $157,000 in attachments on his property and was being sued for nearly $75,000 by his sister-in-law. On June 11, an attorney who represented three women who were owed money by Merrill petitioned in insolvency court seeking to have Merrill's estate seized. On June 23, at a meeting of the Magneso-Calcite Company creditors, the assignee revealed that Merrill placed $50,000 in bonds in circulation despite Merrill's statements to the contrary. On June 30, Edgar S. Hill, Louis W. Raycroft, and James Hewins were assigned by the court to resolve Merrill's affairs. On December 18 and 19, Merrill's furniture, paintings, and other household goods were sold at auction. Merrill's total liabilities were estimated to be around $300,000. However, because most of his creditors were wealthy, they chose to take the loss rather than face public embarrassment.

== Life as Charles F. Grayson ==
Merrill left Boston on May 26, 1893. He sailed on a steamer to Halifax, Nova Scotia. He then spent time in Montreal, St. Louis and Chihuahua City. In 1895, Merrill wrote to Callie Smith, the housekeeper of the Hotel Bellevue. He persuaded her to come to El Paso, Texas where the two married. The couple settled in Silver City, New Mexico, where Merrill lived under the name Charles F. Grayson, a New Mexico man and an acquaintance of his and Smith's. In 1897, Merrill became the agent in New Mexico for Calvin S. Brice. Through Brice, Merrill became acquainted with William N. Coler and Merrill became the western representative of the W. N. Coler & Co. banking house. Merrill's work with Coler required frequent trips to New York City and he kept a second residence there. Brice and Coler purchased a block of stock in the Silver City National Bank and made Merrill president. From 1899 to 1901, Merrill owned the Silver City Enterprise.

Judge John R. McFie introduced Merrill to Territorial Governor Miguel Antonio Otero. Merrill secured an option on the Hanover Mines from Thomas B. Catron for Otero and Chief Justice William J. Mills. As there was competition from New York interests on this property, Otero was very grateful towards Merrill and rewarded him with an appointment as a regent of the New Mexico Normal School. Merrill and McFie attempted to persuade Otero to allow Merrill to refund all of the securities in the territory, but Otero decided against Merrill's proposal. This, along with Otero's decision not to appoint a friend of Merrill's to the board of regents and a disagreement between Merrill and the father of Otero's secretary led to a falling out between the two. In 1901, Merrill opposed Otero's reappointment, which led to Otero looking into Merrill's background and discovering his past in Boston. After Merrill's true identity was revealed to United States Secretary of the Interior Ethan A. Hitchcock, Merrill withdrew his opposition.

== Arrest and death ==
On May 7, 1903, a Boston Police Department detective visiting New York City saw Merrill's wife and a man he believed to be Merrill outside the Harlem Opera House. He trailed them for some time, but lost them. The following day he reported back to his superiors in Boston, who informed him that Merrill was still wanted on an 1893 indictment for embezzlement. A second detective went to New York to assist in locating Merrill and he was found and arrested on May 13. Merrill contested his extradition, claiming he had given John Fottier Jr. of Boston money to pay back his creditors and that he had paid back that he owed. However, one creditor, Sarah Cohen, chose to press her claim against Merrill. On June 2, New York Governor Benjamin Odell signed the papers for Merrill's extradition to Massachusetts, stating that while evidence had been presented that Merrill had paid back some of his debts since leaving Boston, the proper venue to decide his guilt or innocence was Massachusetts. He was taken to Boston that night and sent to Charles Street Jail. He was arranged the following day and pleaded not guilty to the charge that he embezzled $19,000 from Cohen. He was released on $10,000 bail, which was put up by Mariellus Coggan and Hollis Street Theatre proprietor Issac B. Rich. On July 3, the trial was postponed indefinitely due to the illness of one of Merrill's attorneys, B. L. M. Tower. Following Merrill's return to Boston, Suffolk County District Attorney Oliver Stevens began to receive complaints from other women who accused Merrill of defrauding them. In October 1903, Merrill was indicted on 6 counts of embezzlement, 17 counts of larceny, and 1 count of false pretences. On October 15, 1903, Merrill, who had returned to New Mexico, missed a court appearance. He was found to be in default of his bond and a warrant was issued for his arrest.

On December 24, 1903, Merrill died at his apartment at the San Viente Hotel in Silver City from pneumonia complicated by other diseases. His body was shipped back to Boston where, on December 31, it was positively identified by Boston Police Captain Joseph Dugan. A funeral service was held on January 1, 1904, at the Walnut Avenue Congregational Church in Roxbury.
