= Vulcanized fibre =

Laminated plastic composed of cellulose

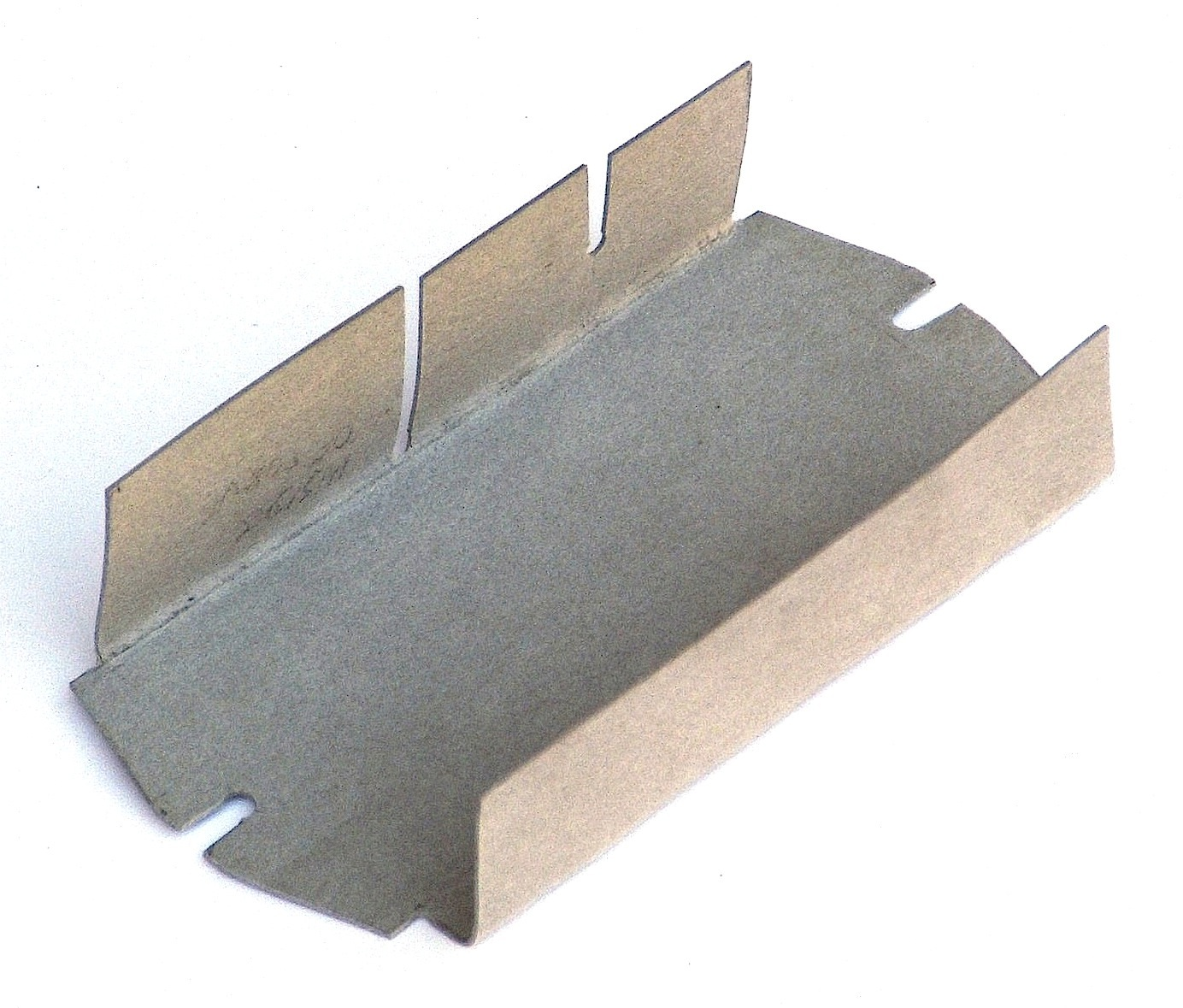
Formed electrical grade vulcanized fibre insulating shield

Vulcanized fibre, also known as red fibre, is a laminated plastic composed of only cellulose. This material is a tough, resilient, hornlike material that is lighter than aluminium, tougher than leather, and stiffer than most thermoplastics. The newer wood-laminating grade of vulcanized fibre is used to strengthen wood laminations used in skis, skateboards, support beams and as a sub-laminate under thin wood veneers.

A product very similar to vulcanized fibre is leatheroid; however, Leatheroid is made using a different chemical process. Since 2004, the scientific community has regained interest in this material due to its renewability and excellent physical properties, giving birth to the field of all-cellulose composites. These composites are all made of a matrix consisting of dissolved or partially dissolved cellulose, and the reinforcement remains cellulose fibres. A variety of solvents other than zinc chloride has been explored, including sodium hydroxide at low temperatures and ionic liquids. Whereas the original idea was to use long reinforcing fibres (ramie, flax, viscose, etc) in order to confer the composites with anisotropic mechanical properties, the field has also explored the use of nanocellulose.

== Applications ==
Vulcanized fibre has a long history in engineering, from the Victorian period onward. Although there are now many materials, mostly synthetic polymers, with higher performance, fibre has been applied widely and still retains many applications. As it is stronger in thin sections between mechanically rigid components, rather than relying on its own strength, it has mostly been used as washers, gaskets, and a variety of shims or packing pieces.

Fibre washers are one of the cheapest conformal elastomer gaskets for sealing pipe unions and general plumbing work. They swell slightly with exposure to water, making a good seal. They may also be used with hydrocarbons, provided the temperature is not too high. Unlike rubber, fibre washer seals are considered as a single-use item.

Fibre sheet is easily die-cut to complex shapes and so it is widely used for shaped gaskets. These may be used for sealing, as heat insulators, or as mechanical spacers.

Until the development of modern plastics from the 1930s, fibre was the standard electrical insulating material for many small components. It could be cut to size easily, either in mass production or hand-trimmed to fit. It was particularly common in the assembly of large machines, such as motor winding.

Some early Swiss Army knives used vulcanized fibre handles.

== History ==
The British patent for vulcanized fibre was obtained in 1859 by the Englishman Thomas Taylor. He gained the patent after the introduction of celluloid in 1856 and before the invention of viscose rayon (regenerated cellulose) in 1894. In 1871 Thomas Taylor obtained the United States Patent for vulcanized fibre. The first organized industrial company to make vulcanized fibre was the Vulcanized Fibre Company, incorporated first as a New York Corporation formed June 19, 1873 listed with William Courtenay President and Charles F. Cobby Secretary. The first N.Y. corporation was also found in the 1873 N.Y. City Directory which also listed William Courtenay President and Charles F. Cobby Secretary in 1873. From 1873 until 1878 the Vulcanized Fiber Co. had a New York office address of 17 Dey St., while the factory was located in Wilmington Delaware. This can be seen in the many advertisements that were placed in different publications at this time in history. A special charter was granted by the state of Delaware in 1873 until the Delaware corporation was finally incorporated on February 8, 1875 which now listed William Courtenay President and Clement B. Smyth Secretary.

In 1884 Courtenay & Trull Co. N.Y. was merged into the Vulcanized Fibre Co. which gave the company control over a new invention called by the trade name "Gelatinized Fibre".

On December 4, 1901, during a merger and consolidation the Vulcanized Fibre Co. changed its name to the "American Vulcanized Fiber Co." which was formed for the purpose of consolidating: Kartavert Mfg. Company, Wilmington, Delaware; American Hard Fibre Company, Newark, Delaware; Vulcanized Fibre Company, Wilmington, Delaware. and the Laminar Fibre Company of North Cambridge, Mass.

In 1922 the name was changed again when it was directly purchased by the National Fibre & Insulation Company of Yorklyn Delaware (who was also the owner of the Keystone Fibre Co.). The president of the National Fibre Company at this time was J. Warren Marshall, who took the same office after consolidating into the new company "National Vulcanized Fibre Company.

In 1965 the name was changed again to the NVF Company in order to avoid confusion over the years with a new and changing product line.

The water power of the Piedmont streams in Northern Delaware led to a proliferation of companies in the vulcanized fibre business. Over the years, these companies reorganized and merged. In 1922 National Vulcanized Fiber Company emerged as the main competitor to Spaulding Fibre, which had begun developing vulcanized products in Rochester, New Hampshire and Tonawanda, New York, nearly a quarter century after the industry began in Delaware.

Some of the companies involved in vulcanized fibre development in the Wilmington region were the Nunsuch Fiber Company, American Hard Fiber Company, American Vulcanized Fibre Company, Continental Fibre Co., Diamond State Fibre Co., and Franklin Fibre Company. In the 1965 Post’s Pulp and Paper Directory, National Vulcanized Fibre Co. was listed as having two mills' producing rag paper for vulcanized fibre. They were at Newark, producing 15 tons a day; and Yorklyn, producing 18 tons a day. This compares with Spaulding Fibre’s Tonawanda plant, then producing 40 tons a day (Post’s directory). The competitors also produced bakelite, but marketed them under different names: Spaulding’s was Spauldite and National’s brand was Phenolite and Iten Industries' Resiten or Itenite.

== Process ==
The process started with paper made from cotton rags. Before the processing of wood pulp and chemical wood pulps in the mid-19th century, the dominant fibre source for paper making was cotton and linen rags. The cotton rag sheet produced for conversion to vulcanized fibre is made like a sheet suitable for saturating. A paper is made for saturating by omitting any sizing additive, either beater added or surface applied. Today most paper sheets made for writing, printing, and coating have internal (beater added) sizing provided by rosin, alkyl succinic anhydride (ASA), or alkyl ketene dimer (AKD) and surface sizing provided by starch. A sheet made for saturating would have none of those chemical ingredients. The unsized saturating cotton fibre paper prepared for vulcanized fibre would be passed through a vat containing a zinc chloride solution.

=== Zinc chloride ===
Zinc chloride is highly soluble in water. The solution used in saturating the paper was 70 Baumé in density (1.93 specific gravity) and about 43.3 °C (109.9 °F; 316.4 K). This is roughly a 70% percent zinc chloride solution. Zinc chloride is a mild Lewis acid with a solution pH of about 4. Zinc chloride can dissolve cellulose, starch, and silk. The zinc chloride used in making vulcanized fibre swelled and gelatinized the cellulose. The fibre swelling explains why paper filters cannot be used to filter zinc chloride solutions. It is also the reason why a number of paper plies were used to build up to the desired vulcanized fibre thickness, rather treating a single paperboard thickness. For instance, the practice was to use 8 paper plies of 0.04 mm thickness each, as opposed to a single paperboard ply of 0.32 mm.

=== Pressing ===
Once the paper plies were saturated with the gelatinizing zinc chloride, they were pressed together. The pressing allowed intimate contact of the cellulose fibres, thus promoting bonding between the cellulose chains. Once the bonding was established, the process of leaching out the zinc chloride from the vulcanized fibre could begin. The leaching (removal by diffusion out) of the zinc chloride was accomplished by subjecting the vulcanized fibre to successively less concentrated baths of zinc chloride. The rate at which this could occur was constrained by osmotic forces. If the rate at which the vulcanized fibre was subjected to lower and lower concentrations of zinc chloride solution were too rapid, the osmotic forces could result in ply separations. The final leaching bath concentration was 0.05% zinc chloride. Thicknesses up to 0.093” (=2.4 mm), can be made on continuous lines that stretch up to 1,000 feet (305m) in length.

=== Vats ===
For thickness above 0.093” (2.4 mm) and up to 0.375” (9.5 mm), a discrete laminated sheet (similar in size (l x w) to plywood) was produced by the cutdown process. The cutdown sheets were racked and moved from vat to vat by overhead tracked cranes. Each vat was successively less concentrated until the desired 0.05% was reached. The thicker the material, the longer it took to leach the zinc chloride to 0.05%. For the thickest products, times of 18 months to 2 years were needed. The zinc chloride used in these processes was for the most part not consumed in achieving the desired bonding. Indeed any dilution of the zinc chloride resulting from the leaching was dealt with by using evaporators to bring the zinc chloride solution back to the 70 Baume needed for using it again for saturating. In a sense, zinc chloride can be thought of as a catalyst in the making of the vulcanized fibre.

=== Dried and pressed ===
Once the vulcanized fibre is leached free of the zinc chloride, it is dried to 5 to 6 percent moisture, and pressed or calendered to flatness. The continuous process-made vulcanized fibre could then be sheeted or wound up into rolls. The density of the finished vulcanized fibre is 2 to 3 times greater than the paper from which it starts. The density increase is the result of 10% machine direction shrinkage, 20% cross machine direction shrinkage, and 30% shrinkage in thickness.

== Properties ==
The final product is a homogeneous nearly 100%-cellulose mass free from any artificial glues, resins, or binders. The finished vulcanized fibre has useful mechanical and electrical properties. It offers high tear and tensile strength, while in the thinner thicknesses allowing flexibility to conform to curves and bends. In thicker thicknesses, it can be moulded to shape with steam and pressure. One application for vulcanized fibre that attests to its physical strength is that it is the preferred material for heavy sanding discs. Physical strength is anisotropic, owing to the roller calendering process, with it typically being 50% stronger in the sheet's longitudinal direction, rather than transverse.

The electrical properties exhibited by vulcanized fibre are high insulating value, and arc and track resistance with service temperature of up to 110 to 120 °C. Fibre was popular as an electrical insulator for a large part of the mid-20th century, not because its resistance as an insulator was particularly good, especially not if moisture levels were high, but it showed far better resistance to tracking and breakdown than early wood flour-filled polymers like Bakelite.

Vulcanized fibre shows high resistance to penetration by most organic solvents, oils, and petroleum derivatives.

== Grades ==
- Commercial Grade; standard grey, black or red, used for many applications such as washers, gaskets, gears, handles, etc.
- Electrical Grade: high dielectric grey, 100% cotton, very flexible, (historically called fishpaper), this grade is suitable for layer and ground insulation and has variations including top-stick grade used for wedges in small motors.
- Trunk Fibre: Tough and abrasion resistant; used to surface steamer trunks, drum cases, wear and skid panels.
- Bone Fibre: Exceptionally hard and dense, used for tight machining, tubing, pool cue ferrules (tips), cut out fuses.
- Wood Laminating: Tough, multi-directional tensile and torsion strength, provides support and strength wherever wood laminations are used, particularly used under thin and exotic veneers as a stabilizer/strengthener.
