= 1890 Boston mayoral election =

Election in Massachusetts, United States

- December 9, 1890
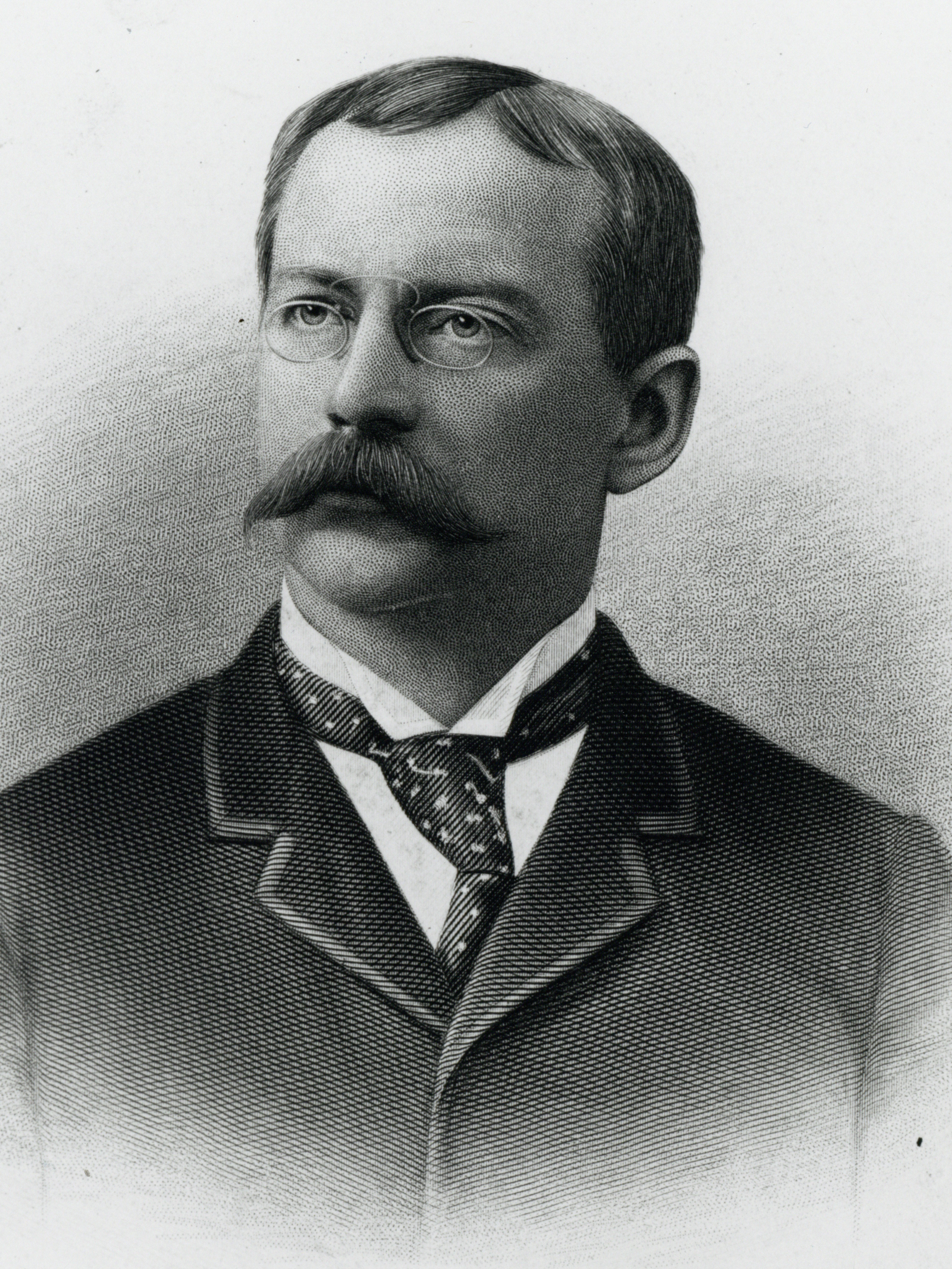

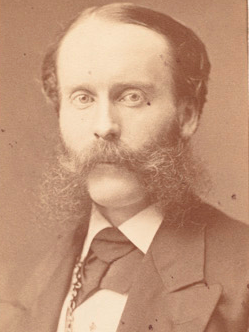
Candidate	Nathan Matthews Jr.	Moody Merrill
Party	Democratic	Republican
Popular vote	32,210	19,957
Percentage	59.37%	36.78%
Mayor before election
Thomas N. Hart
Republican
Elected mayor
Nathan Matthews Jr.
Democratic

The Boston mayoral election of 1890 saw the election of Nathan Matthews Jr. Incumbent Mayor Thomas N. Hart was defeated for the Republican nomination by Moody Merrill.

== Results ==
1890 Boston mayoral election
Party	Candidate	Votes	%
Democratic	Nathan Matthews Jr.	32,210	59.37%
Republican	Moody Merrill	19,957	36.78%
Prohibition	Samuel B. Shapleigh	2,043	3.77%
Others	Scattering	44	0.08%
Turnout		54,254	

== See also ==
- List of mayors of Boston, Massachusetts
