= Leatheroid =

Cellulose material

Leatheroid is cellulose material very similar to vulcanized fibre in physical properties and uses. It is prepared using unsized cotton rag paper (as is vulcanized fibre) and mineral acid.

== Manufacturer ==
Leatheroid was made by the Leatheroid Manufacturing Company and its successors the Mousam Manufacturing Company, the National Fibreboard Company and the Rogers Fibre Company. For nearly 50 years from 1881 to 1930 Leatheroid was made in Kennebunk, Maine.

== History ==
The Leatheroid Manufacturing Company's first existence can be traced to Wheeling, West Virginia. The 1879 Session Laws of West Virginia showed the following individuals to hold shares:

| Share holder and location | Number of shares |
|---|---|
| Thompson Hanna, of Wheeling, West Virginia | 125 |
| Chas. E. Dwight, of Wheeling, West Virginia | 25 |
| Thomas Hanna, of Wheeling, West Virginia | 25 |
| Daniel Clemmans, of Wheeling. West Virginia | 25 |
| Daniel W. Hanna, of Wheeling, West Virginia | 1 |

The West Virginia law incorporated the company with $20,200 in initial capitalization, each share having a $100 value. The company was authorized to increase its capitalization to $100,000 through the sale of additional shares with the value of $100 each. Leatheroid operated in Wheeling for a year and then moved on to Pittsburgh, Pennsylvania, for a year and next to Philadelphia, Pennsylvania. Finally Leatheroid was purchased by the Mousam Manufacturing Company and its equipment and manufacturing operations removed to Kennebunk, Maine.

The Mousam Manufacturing Company was organized in 1875 to manufacture leatherboard at Kennebunk, Maine. Among those organizing Mousam Manufacturing Company were Emery Andrews, S. B. Rogers, Stephen Moore, and Homer Rogers. The company's name was the same as a cotton mill that had operated in Kennebunk from 1838 to 1850 and ceased operations after being destroyed in a fire. Mousam Manufacturing Company used most of its leatherboard in the production of shoe counters, which are used to stiffen the heel area of boots and shoes.

In 1881 when Mousam Manufacturing Company purchased Leatheroid and moved its manufacturing equipment into nearby mill buildings adjacent to its own leatherboard mill in Kennebunk, Maine, it organized it as a separate company, the Leatheroid Manufacturing Company. Emery Andrews, S.B. Rogers, Stephen Moore, and Homer Rogers were board members and controlling stock holders in the Leatheroid Manufacturing Company as they were in Mousam Manufacturing Company. In 1891 the Mousam Manufacturing Company and the Leatheroid Manufacturing Company along with Harwood Manufacturing Company of Leominster, Massachusetts, the Towne Manufacturing Company of Boston, Massachusetts, and the Clegg and Fisher Mill at Lawrence, Massachusetts, were merged into a new company known as the Consolidated Fibre Board and Leatheroid Company. This consolidation was known as the National Fibre Board Company with Emery Andrews as president and the board of directors consisting of Charles H. Allen, Homer Rogers, J. A. Harwood, Stephen Moore, and W.C. Gogswell. In 1918 the National Fibre Board Company changed its name to Rogers Fibre Company. The officers of Rogers Fibre Company in 1920 were Elliott Rogers, Pres., Kennebunk, Me.; Louis Rogers, V-P; E. W. Freeman, Clerk, Portland, Me.; L. B.Rogers, Treas. & Gen. Mgr.; E. O. Hallberg, Asst. Treas. Boston, Mass. In 1930 the Leatheroid business of Rogers Fibre Company and its equipment were sold to the Delaware Hard Fibre Company. All usable equipment was removed from the Leatheroid operations in the Island and Dirigo buildings at Kennebunk, thus bringing an end to Leatheroid production in Kennebunk, Maine.

== Current production ==
The name Leatheroid is still used for seal and gasket material on the market today.

== Process ==
The key patents for the development of leatheroid were:

| Date | Patent number | Title | Inventor(s) | Assignor(s) |
|---|---|---|---|---|
| January 15, 1867 | 61,267 | Improvement in the Treatment of Paper and Paper Pulp | Augustus Theodore Schmidt of Pittsburgh, Pennsylvania | |
| October 20. 1877 | 198,382 | Improvement in Manufacture of Parchment-Paper | Thompson Hanna and Thompson S. Hanna of Pittsburgh, Pennsylvania | |
| February 24, 1885 | 312,945 | Manufacture of Parchment-Paper or Leatheroid | Emery Andrews of Kennebunk, Maine | Leatheroid Manufacturing Company of Kennebunk, Maine |

These patents centered on using mineral acids (sulfuric and hydrochloric) to produce the high level of bonding for parchmentized paper and leatheroid as compared to using zinc chloride to produce vulcanized fibre. The basic process for producing parchmentized paper is to pass the paper through an acid bath, press it, wash the paper, neutralize the remaining acids in the paper with a caustic bath of ammonium hydroxide, sodium hydroxide, or other suitable caustic solution, wash the paper again, and then dry the paper in the normal way. This process is used to this day to produce parchmentized paper. However the use of this process to produce the highly bonded fibre board known as leatheroid had problems to be surmounted. Using the cutdown machine to build up multiple layers of paper to various board weights entailed the problem of how to keep the acid from destroying the cellulose chains. The key to the using the parchmentizing process for paper in the production of paperboard seems to center around using other chemical agents in the parchmentizing acid solution to retard or delay the destruction of the cellulose chains until such time as the acid is washed out or neutralized. Examples of such agents are given patent number 198,382 as zinc and dextrin (dextrine). Other organic matters that may substitute for dextrin mentioned in 198382 were crude petroleum, blood, albumen, and paper and pulp. Another technique used to retard or delay the action of the parchmentizing acid solution was to keep the reaction cold. The technique and equipment designed to accomplish it are described patent number 312,945. The importance of keeping the reaction cold was so important that leatheroid manufacturing in Kennebunk was suspended every summer until 1889 when the Leatheroid Manufacturing Company dug a well that provided a source of cold water year round as an alternative to using Mousam River water.
