= 1891 Boston mayoral election =

Election in Massachusetts, United States

- December 15, 1891
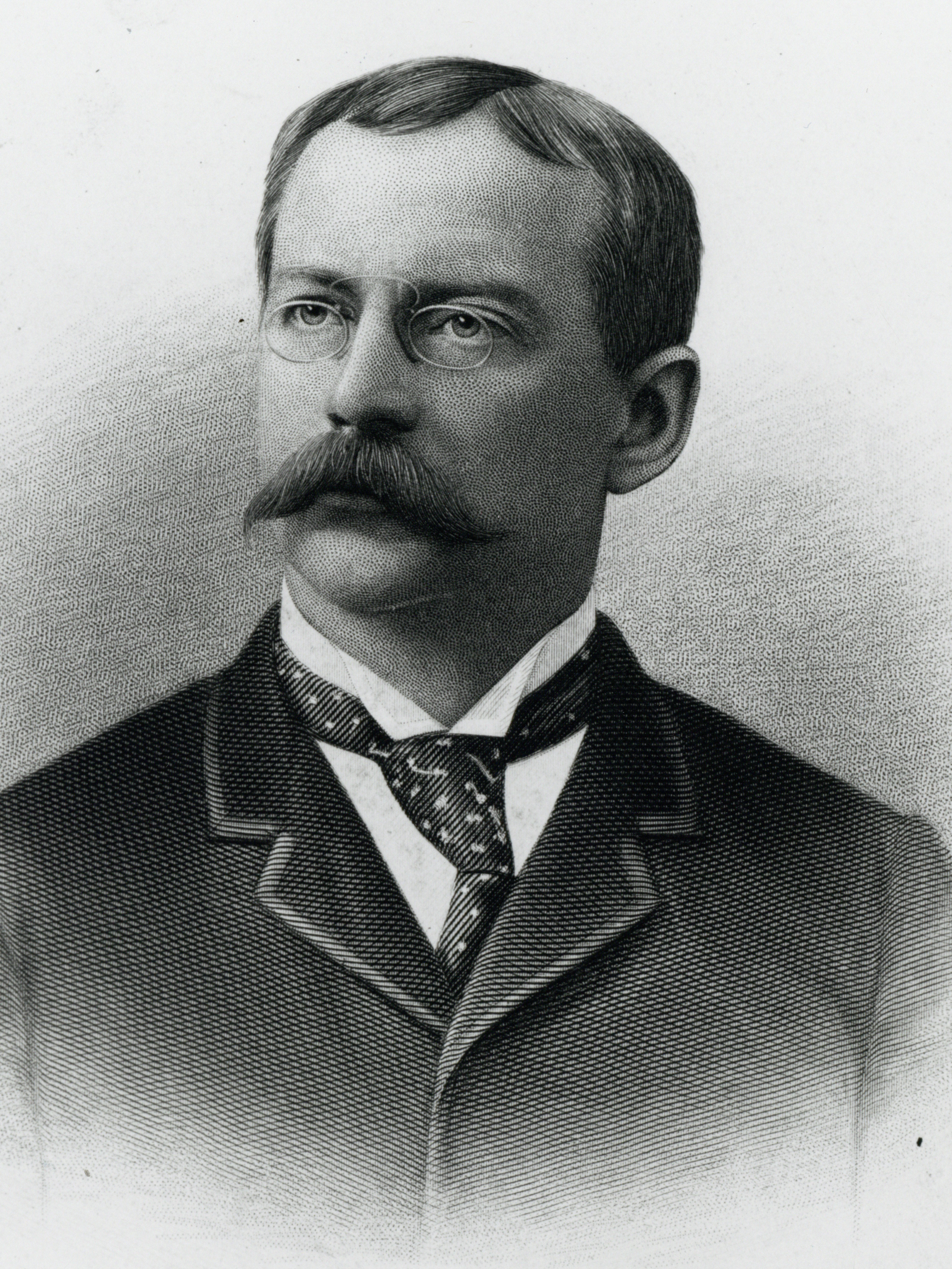

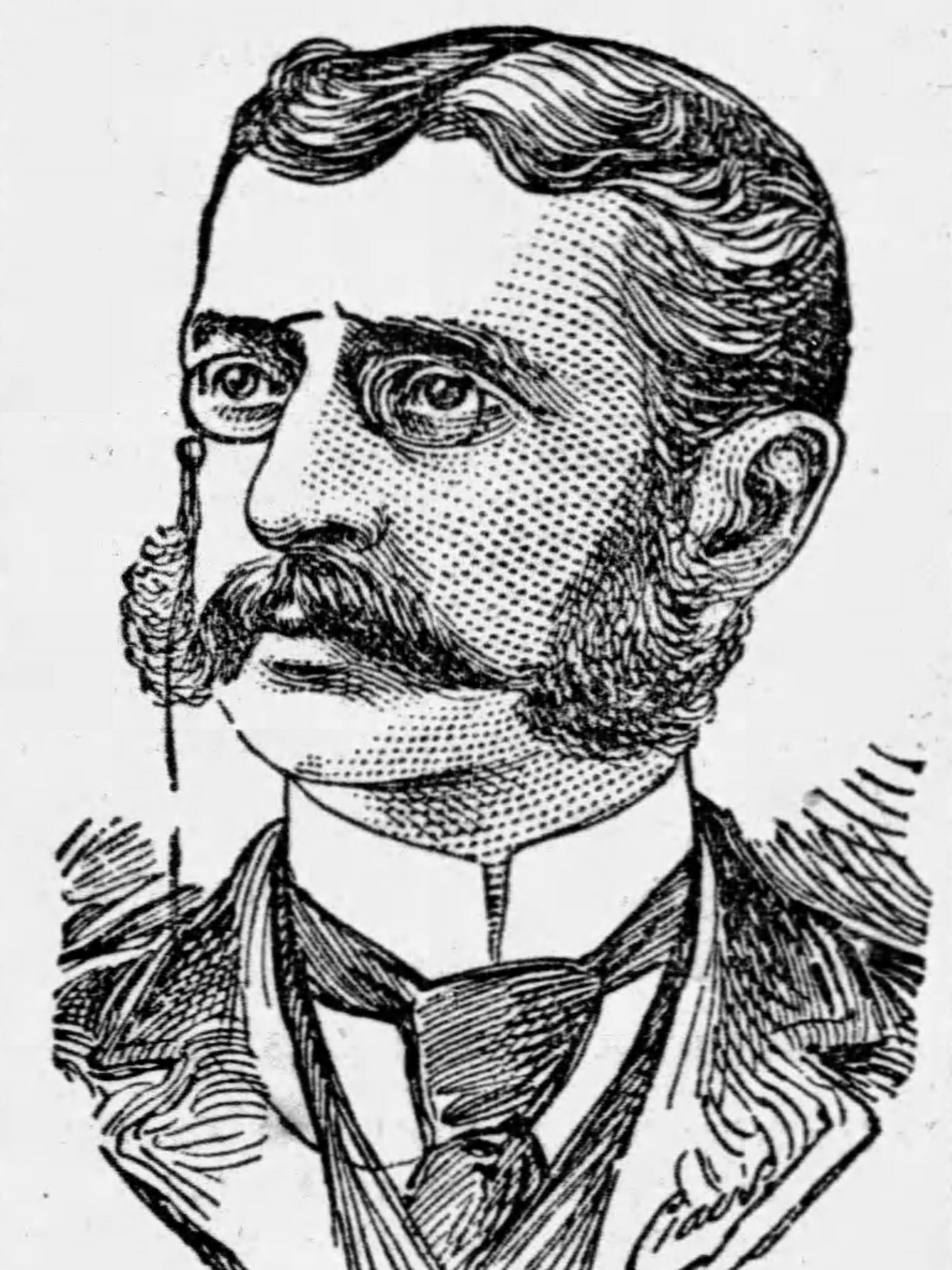
Candidate	Nathan Matthews Jr.	Horace G. Allen
Party	Democratic	Republican
Popular vote	34,708	19,532
Percentage	63.09%	35.50%
Mayor before election
Nathan Matthews Jr.
Democratic
Elected mayor
Nathan Matthews Jr.
Democratic

The Boston mayoral election of 1891 saw the reelection of Nathan Matthews Jr.

== Results ==
1891 Boston mayoral election
Party	Candidate	Votes	%
Democratic	Nathan Matthews Jr. (incumbent)	34,708	63.09%
Republican	Horace G. Allen	19,532	35.50%
Prohibition	Samuel B. Shapleigh	778	1.41%
Turnout		55,018	

== See also ==
- List of mayors of Boston, Massachusetts
