= 1892 Boston mayoral election =

Election in Massachusetts, United States

- December 13, 1892
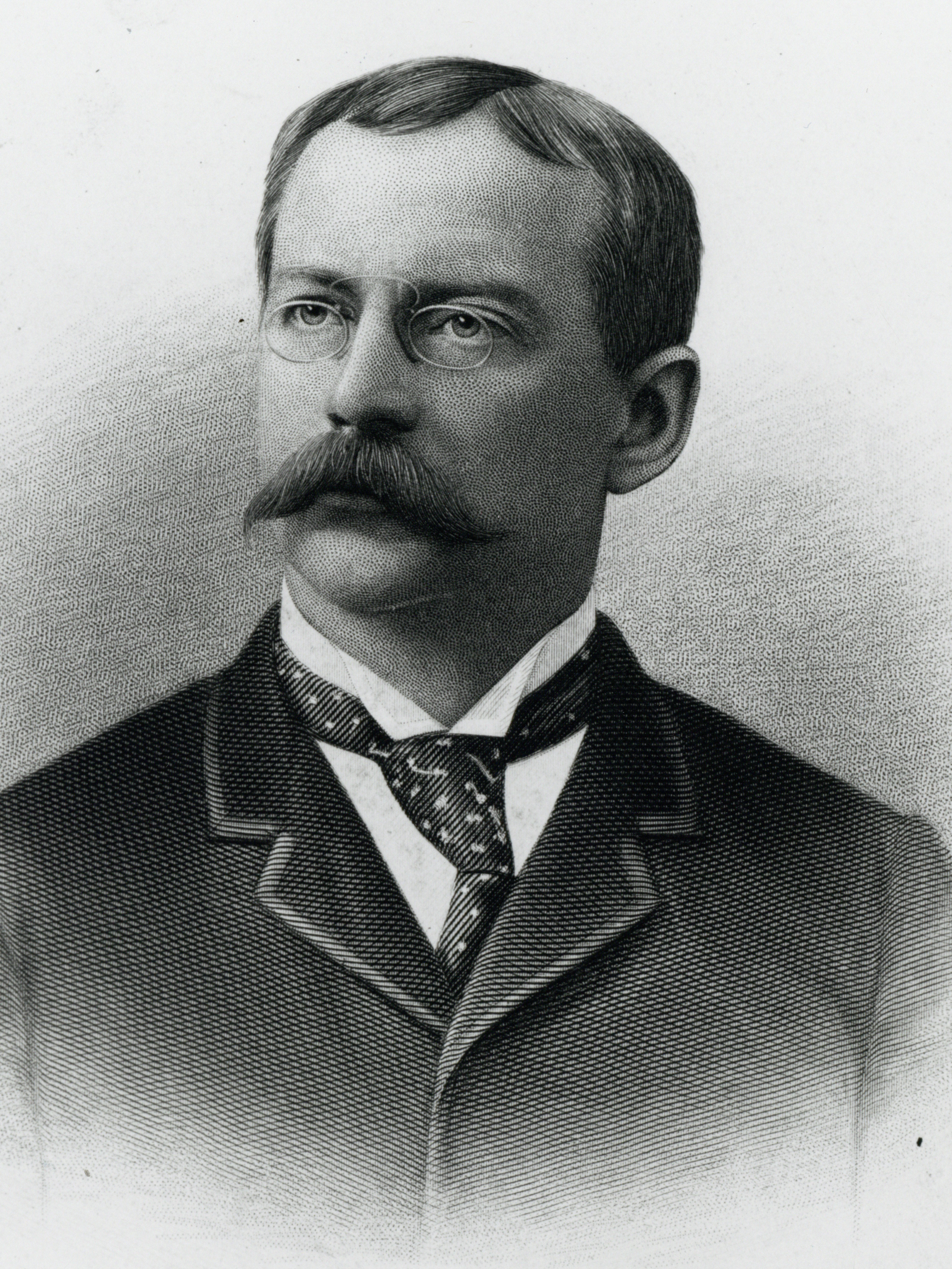

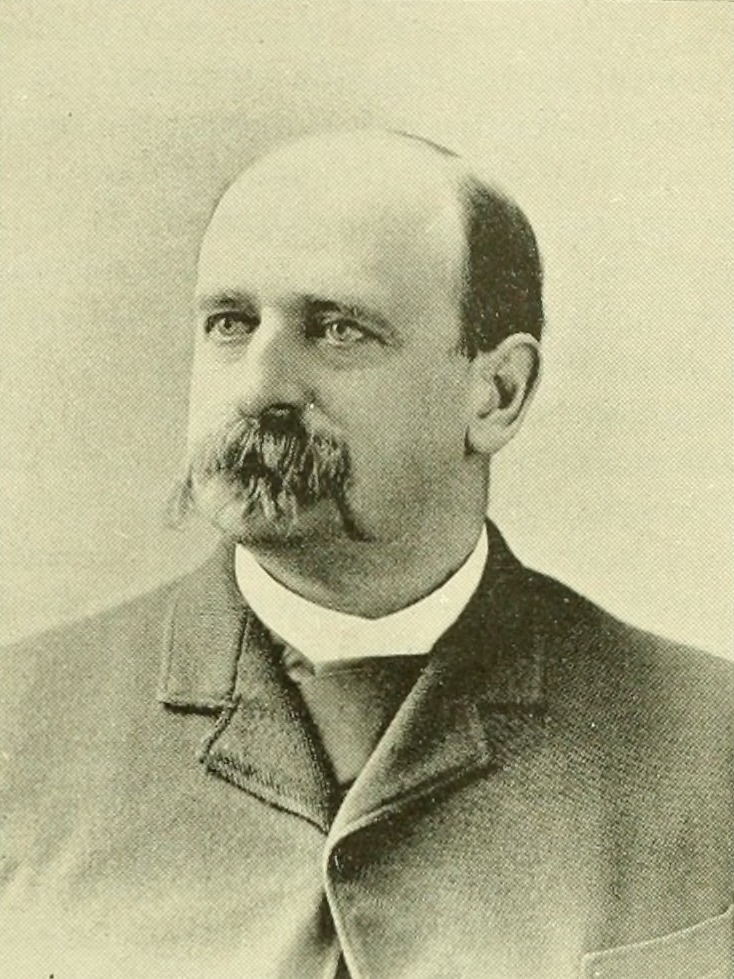
Candidate	Nathan Matthews Jr.	Homer Rogers
Party	Democratic	Republican
Popular vote	39,986	26,671
Percentage	59.98%	40.01%
Mayor before election
Nathan Matthews Jr.
Democratic
Elected mayor
Nathan Matthews Jr.
Democratic

The Boston mayoral election of 1892 saw the reelection of Nathan Matthews Jr. to a third consecutive term.

== Results ==
1892 Boston mayoral election
Party	Candidate	Votes	%
Democratic	Nathan Matthews Jr. (incumbent)	39,986	59.98%
Republican	Homer Rogers	26,671	40.01%
Others	Scattering	10	0.02%
Turnout		66,667	

== See also ==
- List of mayors of Boston, Massachusetts
