= Brighton Center Historic District =

Historic district in Massachusetts, United States

- U.S. National Register of Historic Places
- U.S. Historic district
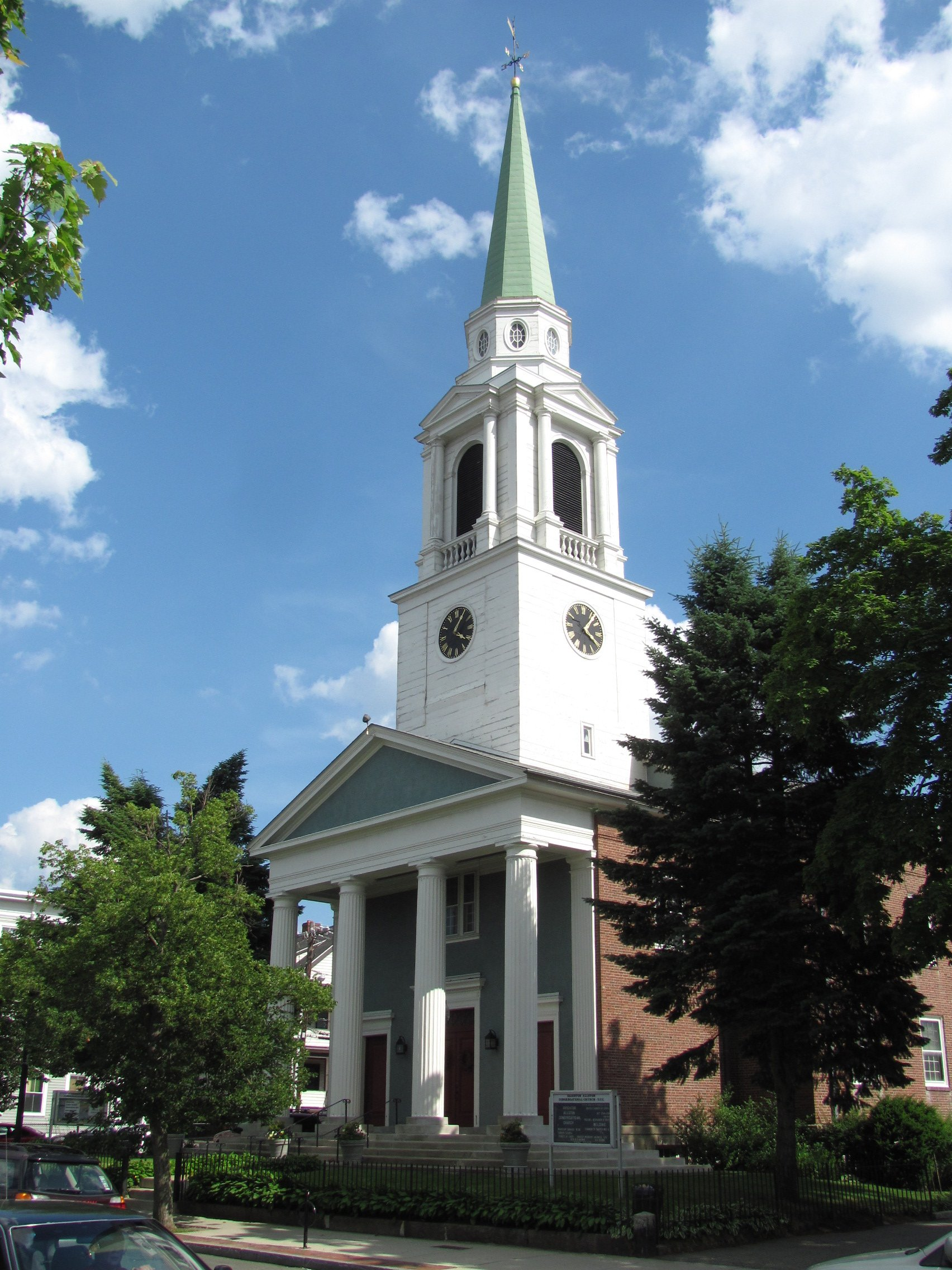
- Brighton Allston Congregational Church

- Location within Massachusetts Location within the United States
- Location: Boston, Massachusetts
- Coordinates: 42°20′54″N 71°9′15″W
- Area: 15 acres (6.1 ha)
- Architect: multiple
- Architectural style: Greek Revival, Italianate
- NRHP reference No.: 01000088
- Added to NRHP: February 20, 2001

The Brighton Center Historic District encompasses the civic center of the Brighton neighborhood of Boston, Massachusetts.

The district is centered at the junction of Washington Street with Market Street and Chestnut Hill Avenue, radiating along those roads and including a number of immediately adjacent properties on adjacent streets. The oldest resource in the district is the Market Street Burial Ground, which was established in 1764. Originally part of Watertown and Cambridge in colonial times, Brighton was incorporated as a separate town in 1807 and annexed to Boston in 1874. The center area became a focus of the regional cattle business during the 19th century, but little of that time has survived, with only a small handful of buildings pre-dating 1875. The local cattle yards were removed in 1881, and the center developed as a place to provide community services, resulting in a series of commercial buildings on Washington Street and a collection of municipal and civic structures along Market Street and Chestnut Hill Avenue.

The district was listed on the National Register of Historic Places in 2001.

== See also ==
- National Register of Historic Places listings in southern Boston, Massachusetts
