= Nathan Matthews Jr. =

American politician (1854-1927)

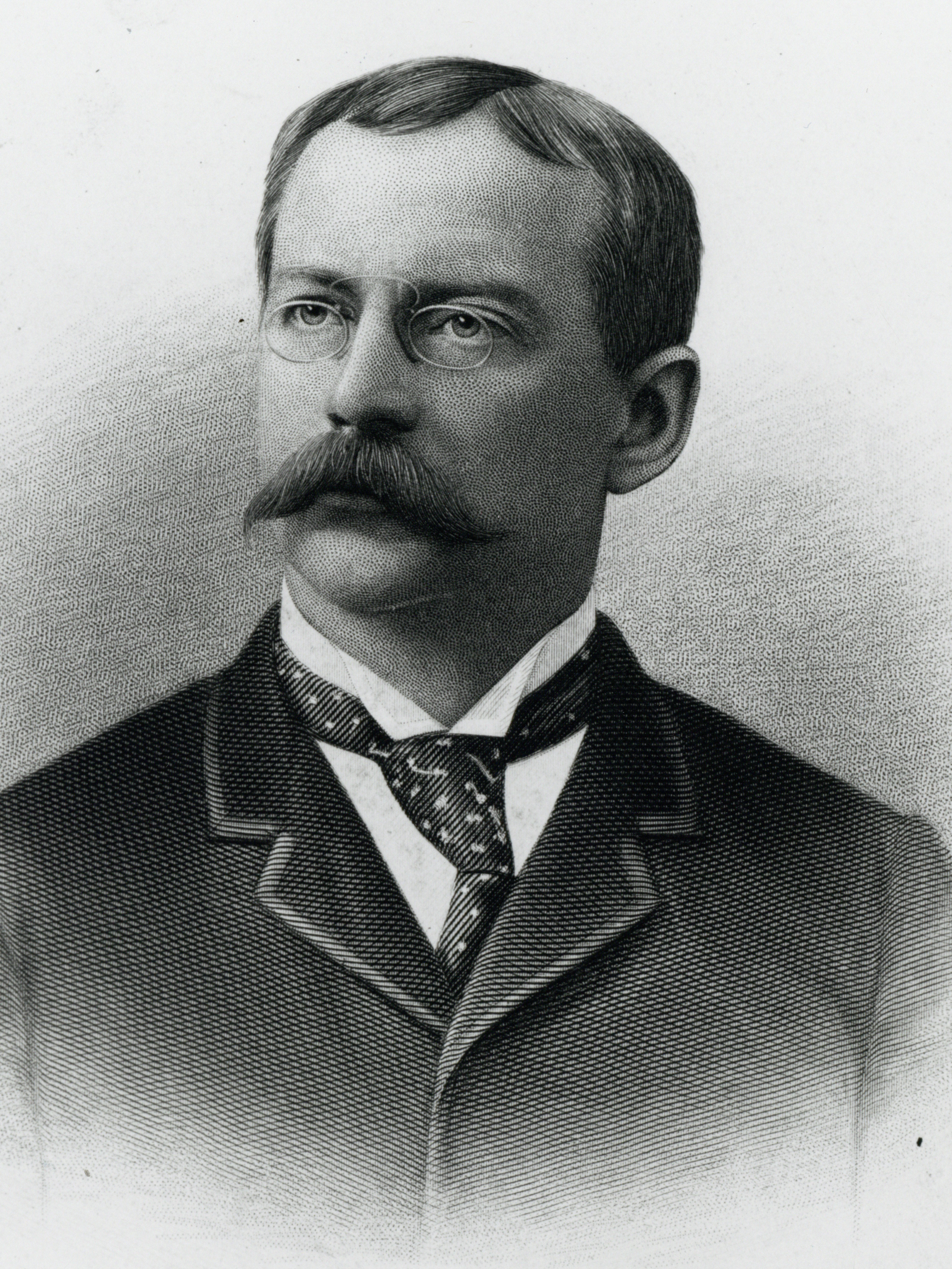

Mayor of Boston
- In office 1891–1894
- Preceded by: Thomas N. Hart
- Succeeded by: Edwin Upton Curtis

Personal details
- Born: March 28, 1854 Boston, Massachusetts, U.S.
- Died: December 11, 1927 (aged 73) Boston, Massachusetts, U.S.
- Resting place: Mount Auburn Cemetery, Cambridge, Massachusetts
- Party: Democratic
- Spouse: Ellen B. Sargent
- Children: Sullivan Amory Matthews, Ellen Nathalie Matthews
- Education: Harvard A.B., 1875; L.L.B., 1880; L.L.D., 1909. University of Leipzig 1876–1877.
- Profession: Attorney

Nathan Matthews Jr. (March 28, 1854 – December 11, 1927) was an American politician from Massachusetts who served as mayor of Boston from 1891 to 1894.

== Biography ==
Born in Boston, Massachusetts on March 28, 1854, son of Nathan and Albertine (Bunker) Matthews. Nathan Matthews Jr. was a lawyer-turned-politician who served as the mayor of Boston from 1891 to 1894. He was a member of the Democratic Party. Matthews earned an A.B. from Harvard College in 1875 and a LL.B. from Harvard Law School in 1880. He married Ellen Bacon, daughter of Col. Lucius Manlius Sargent Jr. on April 5, 1883. They had two children, Ellen Natalie Matthews and Sullivan Amory Matthews.

== Mayoralty ==
On December 15, 1891, Mathews was reelected Mayor over Horace G. Allen by 15,182 votes.

== Death and burial ==
Matthews died at Massachusetts General Hospital on December 11, 1927, from a pulmonary embolism. He is interred at Mount Auburn Cemetery, Cambridge, Massachusetts.

== See also ==
- Timeline of Boston, 1890s
- 1890 Boston mayoral election
- 1891 Boston mayoral election
- 1892 Boston mayoral election
- 1893 Boston mayoral election

Political offices
Preceded by Thomas N. Hart	33rd Mayor of Boston, Massachusetts; 1891–1894	Succeeded by Edwin Upton Curtis
