= Allston Congregational Church =

Historic church in Massachusetts, United States

- Allston Congregational Church/Arabic Jumaa Mosque
- U.S. National Register of Historic Places
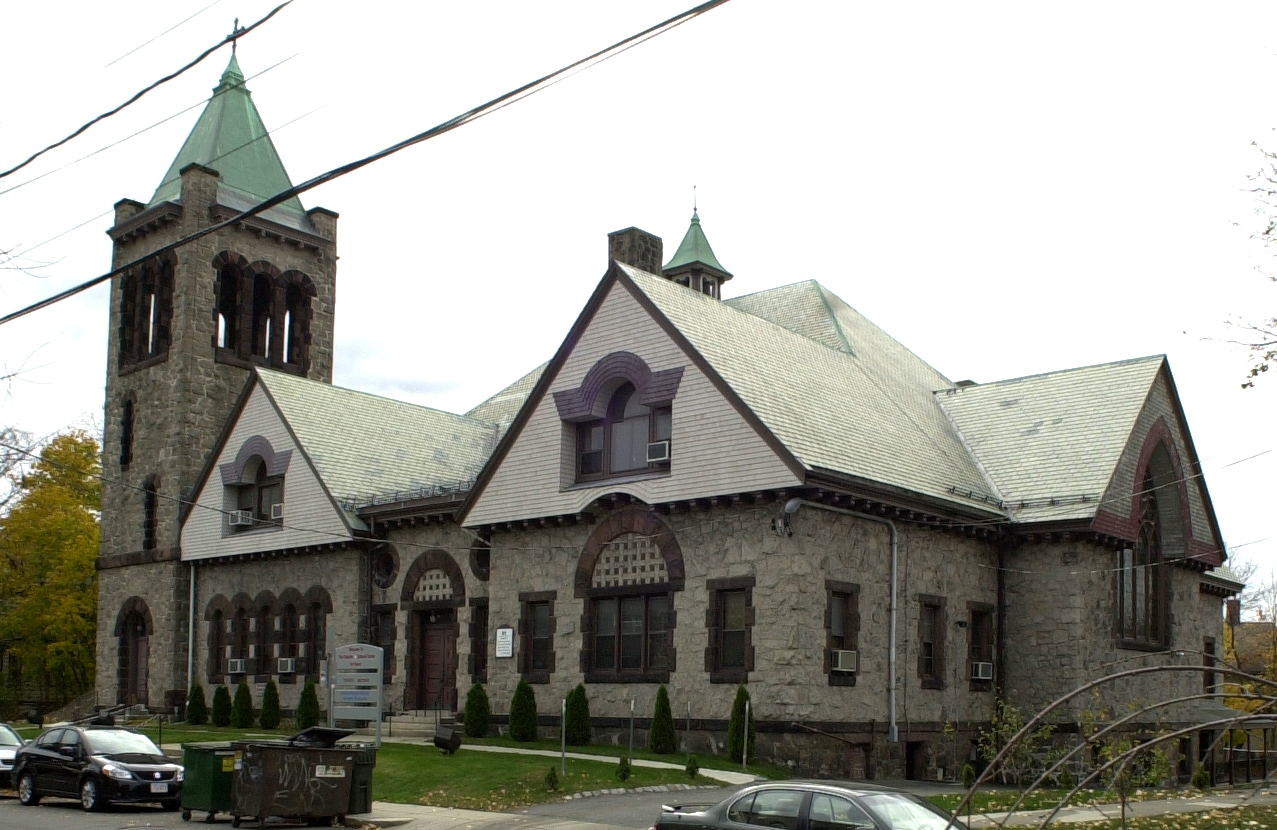

- Location within Massachusetts Location within the United States
- Location: 31-41 Quint Ave., Boston, Massachusetts
- Coordinates: 42°21′6″N 71°8′4″W
- Area: 1 acre (0.40 ha)
- Built: 1890
- Built by: Woodbury & Leighton
- Architect: Eugene L. Clark
- Architectural style: Richardsonian Romanesque
- NRHP reference No.: 97001377
- Added to NRHP: November 07, 1997

Allston Congregational Church is a historic Congregational church building at 31-41 Quint Avenue in the Allston neighborhood Boston, Massachusetts. Built in 1890–91 to a design by Allston native Eugene L. Clark, it is a prominent local example of Richardsonian Romanesque architecture. The property includes a Shingle style parsonage built about the same time. The buildings were listed on the National Register of Historic Places in 1997. The building presently houses a mosque and the Palestinian Cultural Center for Peace.

== Description and history ==
The former Allston Congregational Church building is located in the southern part of Allston, on the west side of Quint Avenue. It is a large two-story stone structure, built out of pink granite quarried in Milton and trimmed with dark sandstone from Longmeadow. At the left end of its main facade is an 80-foot (24 m) square tower, with an open belfry and pyramidal roof. The main entrance is set at an angle in the tower base. The bulk of the rectangular structure is covered by a tall hip roof, from which two gables project to the front, and one to the right side. The gable ends are finished in wooden shingles. Windows are set in round-arch openings, highlighted by dark trim stones. Adjacent to the church is a Shingle style parsonage house, built about the same time as the church.

The Allston congregation was organized in 1886, and the church was completed in 1892. It was designed by Allston native Eugene L. Clark, who is principally known for his residential designs; this is his only known church commission. It is one of a small number of fine Richardsonian Romanesque buildings in Boston. The congregation underwent a period decline beginning in the 1960s, and the church gradually shared the space with other congregations. It now houses the Arabic Jumaa Mosque.

== Gallery ==
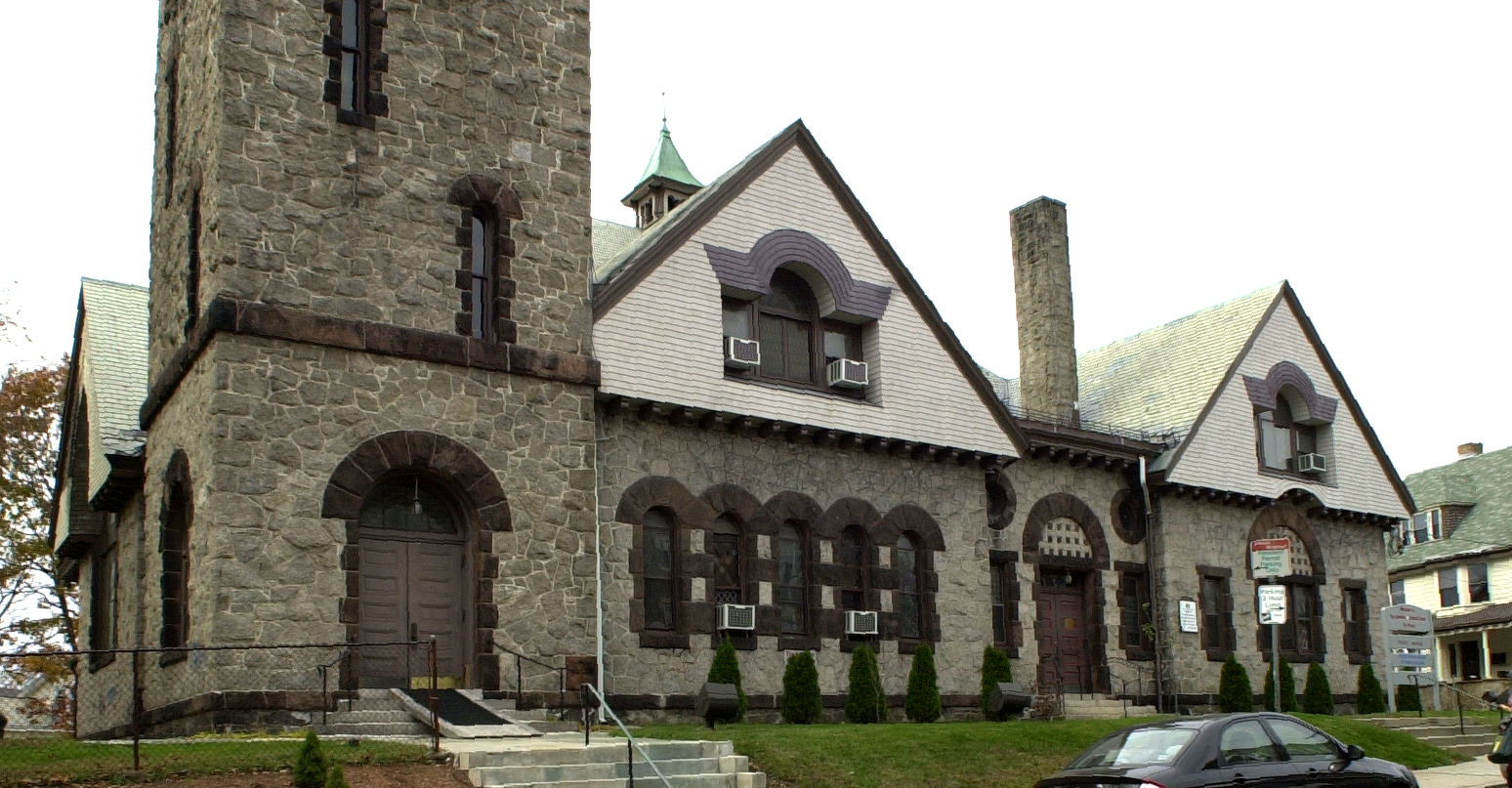

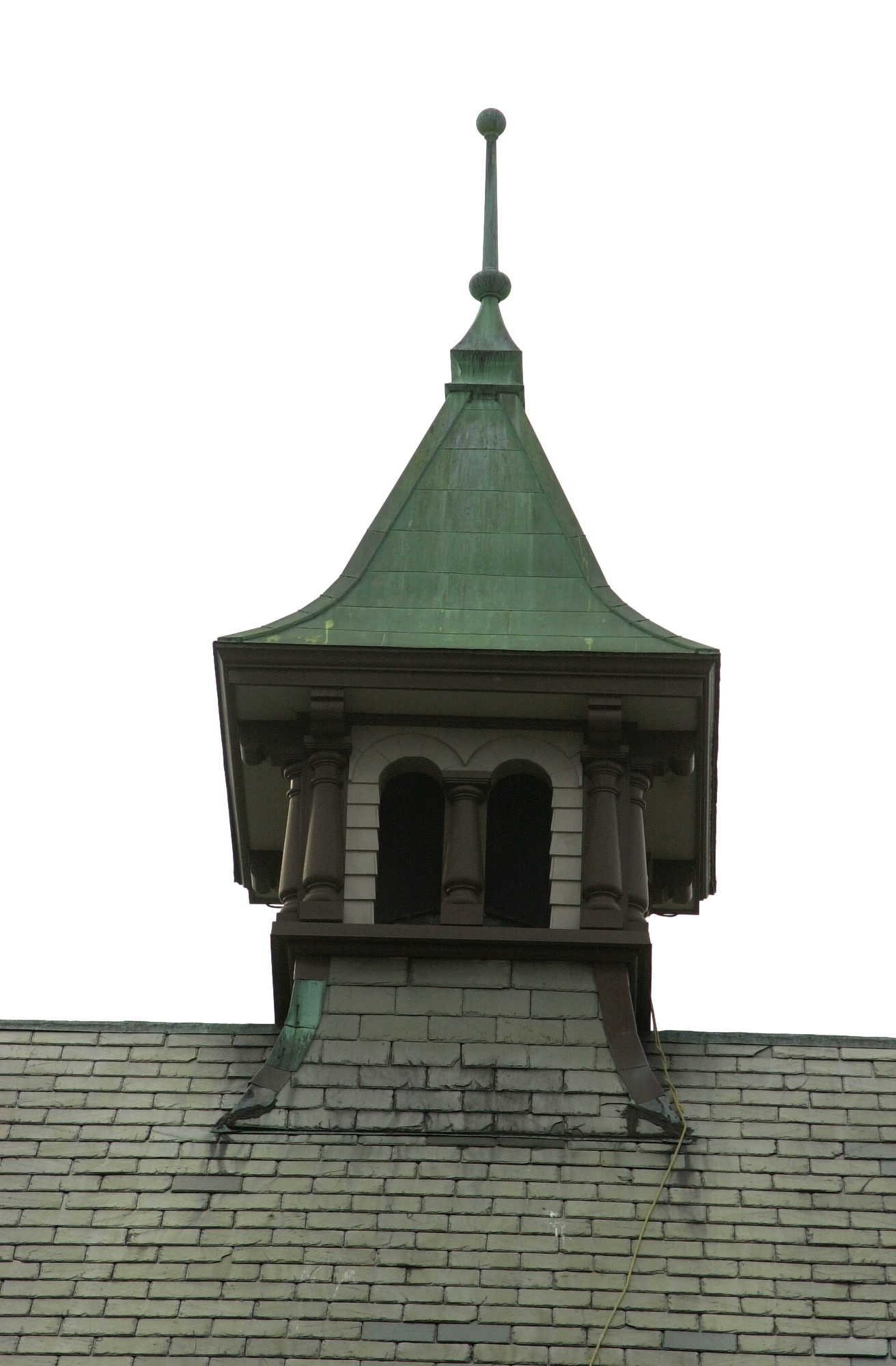

== See also ==
- National Register of Historic Places listings in southern Boston, Massachusetts
