= Droste (disambiguation) =

Droste may refer to:

== People ==
- Droste (surname)
- Droste zu Vischering, a Westphalian noble family

== Prizes ==
- Droste-Preis (Droste Prize), a German literary prize; named after Annette von Droste (zu Hülshoff)
- Heinrich-Droste-Literaturpreis (Heinrich Droste Literature Prize, Droste Prize), a German literary prize

== Other uses ==
- Droste B.V., a Dutch chocolate maker

== See also ==
- Droste Park, Johannesburg, Gauteng, South Africa; a suburb
- 12240 Droste-Hülshoff, an asteroid in the Main Belt; named after Annette von Droste (zu Hülshoff)
- Droste effect, recursive image
- Drost (disambiguation)
