= German chocolate cake =

Layered chocolate cake named after Samuel German

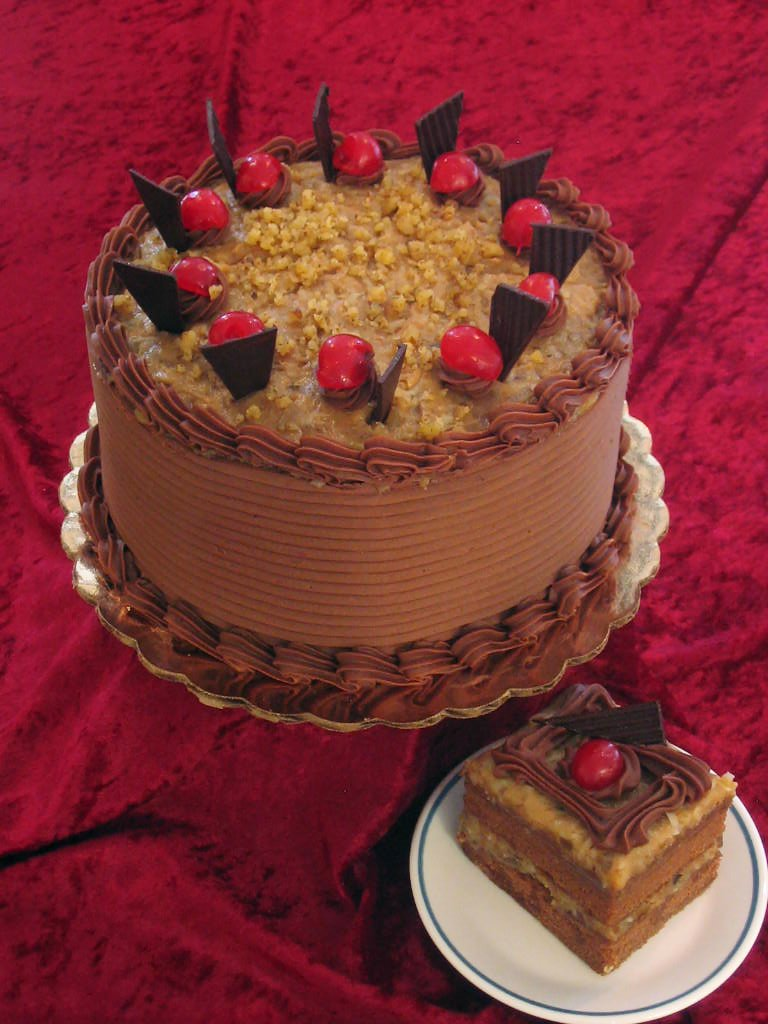
- A German chocolate cake
- Alternative names: German's chocolate cake
- Type: Layer cake
- Course: Dessert
- Place of origin: United States
- Region or state: Texas
- Created by: Unknown
- Invented: 1950s
- Main ingredients: Chocolate cake, icing (egg yolks, evaporated milk, coconut and pecan)

German chocolate cake, originally German's chocolate cake, is a layered chocolate cake filled and topped with a coconut-pecan frosting. Originating in Dallas, Texas, United States, it was named after English-American chocolate maker Samuel German, who developed a formulation of dark baking chocolate that came to be used in the cake recipe. Sweet baking chocolate is traditionally used for the flavor of the cake, but few recipes call for it today. The filling or topping is a custard made with egg yolks and evaporated milk; once the custard is cooked, coconut and pecans are stirred in.

== History ==
The earliest known published recipe for this cake appeared in 1956 in the Dallas newspaper The Irving News Record, where it was listed as "Summer German Chocolate Cake". It was submitted by Daisy Pearce, who obtained the recipe from her daughter, Francis Beth (Montgomery) Tomlinson. It used the "German's Sweet Chocolate" baking chocolate introduced over a century earlier in 1853 by American baker Samuel German for the Baker's Chocolate Company of Boston, Massachusetts.

In 1957, another recipe for "German's Chocolate Cake" appeared as the "Recipe of the Day" in The Dallas Morning News. It was created by Lucy Clay, frequently cited as Mrs. George Clay, a homemaker from Dallas, Texas.

General Foods, which owned the Baker's brand at the time, took notice of the recipe and distributed the cake recipe to other newspapers in the country. Sales of Baker's Chocolate are said to have increased by as much as 73% and the cake became a national staple. The possessive form German's was dropped in subsequent publications, forming the "German Chocolate Cake" identity and giving the false impression of a German origin.

In 1958, Mrs. Jackie Huffines’ recipe for “Samuel German Chocolate Cake” was published in General Foods’ cookbook.

In a 1959 General Foods Co. newsletter, a St. Louis homemaker reported that she was given a similar recipe in the 1920s but could not bake it at the time because she could not afford the ingredients during the Depression.

== Hawaii ==
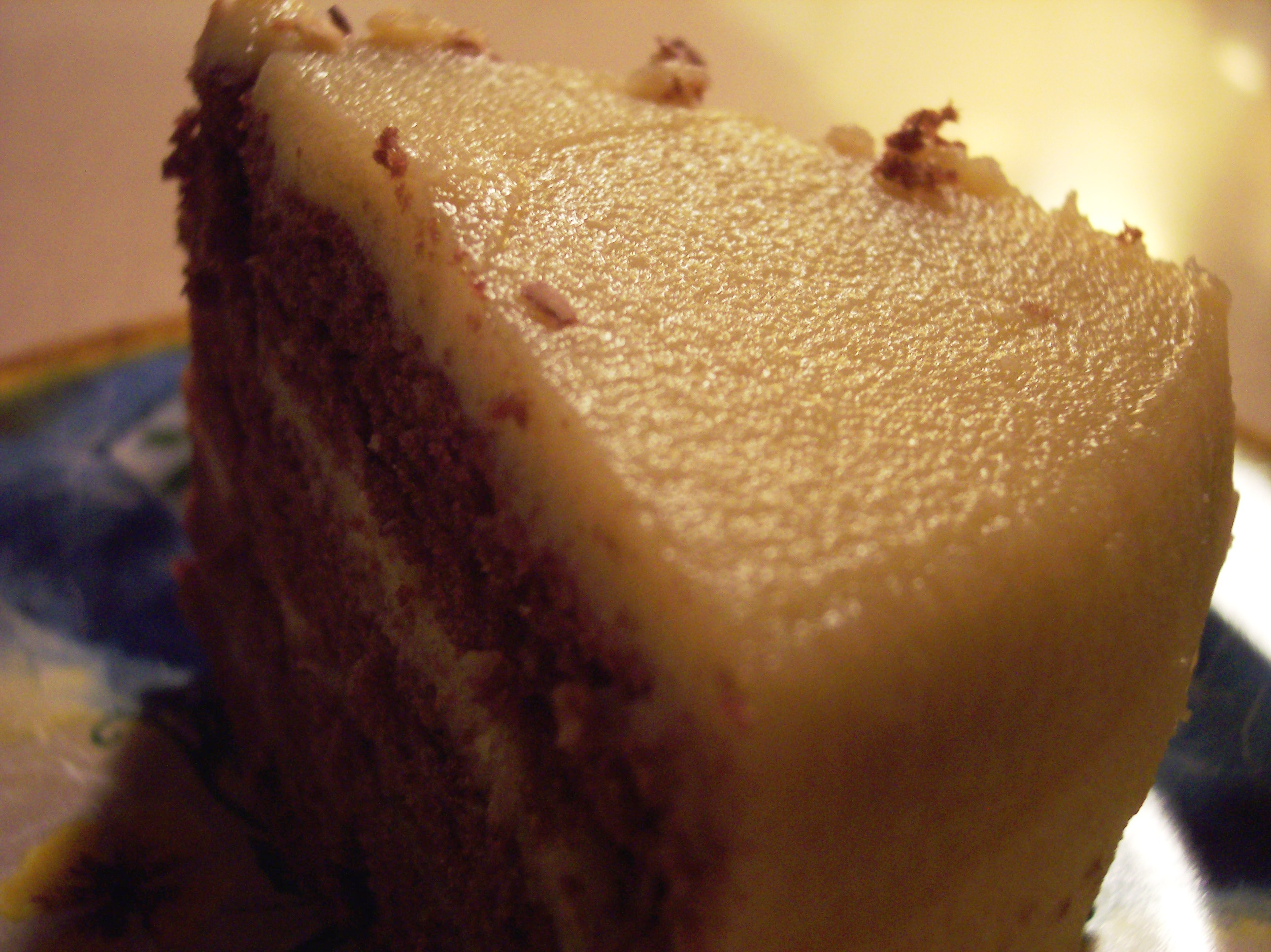
Chantilly cake in Hawaii

Popular throughout Hawaii is the Chantilly cake, a modified German chocolate cake without coconut or nuts in its frosting, although it is occasionally topped with macadamia nuts. Otherwise, recipes between German chocolate cake and Chantilly cake are nearly identical. This frosting, also known as "Chantilly," can also be applied on cream puffs. Despite its name, it does not contain Chantilly cream.

== See also ==
- Black Forest cake, or Schwarzwälder Kirschtorte, a chocolate- and cherry-flavored cake that is of contested German origin
- List of desserts
- Sheet cake
