= Baker's Chocolate =

Brand of baking chocolate

Baker's
- Product type: Baking chocolate
- Current owner: Kraft Heinz
- Produced by: Kraft Foods
- Introduced: 1780; 246 years ago as Baker Chocolate Company
- Website: bakers-chocolate.com

Baker's Chocolate is a brand name for the line of baking chocolates owned by Kraft Heinz. Products include a variety of bulk chocolates, including white and unsweetened, and sweetened coconut flakes. It is one of the largest national brands of chocolate in the United States. The company was originally named Walter Baker & Company.

== History ==
In 1764, John Hannon (alternatively spelled "Hannan" in some sources) and the American physician Dr. James Baker started importing cocoa beans and producing chocolate in the Lower Mills section of Dorchester, Massachusetts. The original brand name was "Hannon’s Best Chocolate", which was "manufactured for almost fifteen years" and was sold with a money-back guarantee if the consumer was unsatisfied with the product. Distribution was mainly in the Northeastern United States until 1804 when James Baker's son, Edmund Baker, inherited the family business and increased production with a state-of-the-art mill. Before 1865 the company originally purveyed three grades of drinking chocolate, which were "Best Chocolate", "Common Chocolate", and "Inferior Chocolate". The inferior grade was mostly sold to West Indian and American slaves.

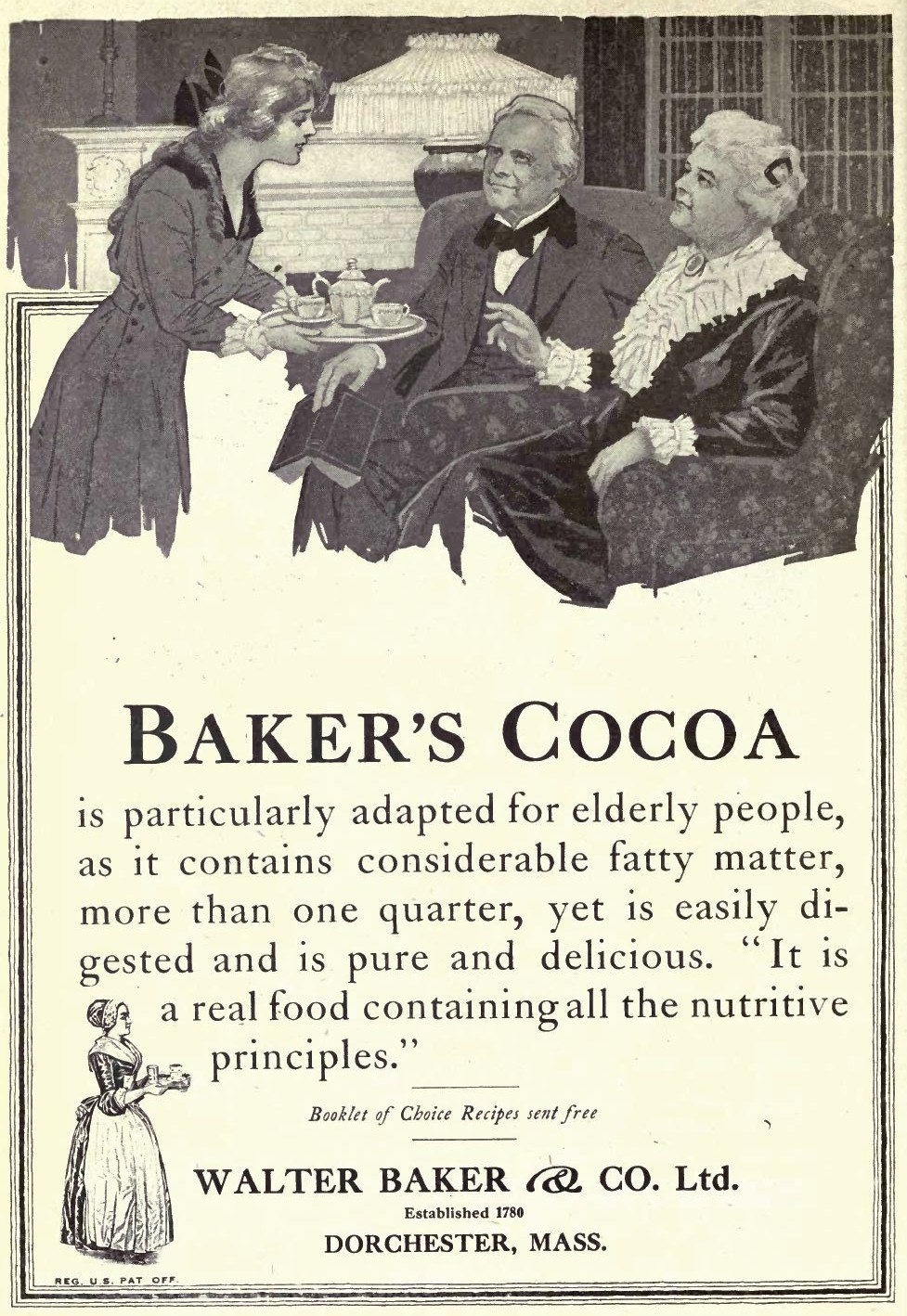
Baker's Cocoa Advertisement in Overland Monthly, January 1919

After Hannon never returned from a 1779 sailing trip to the West Indies to purchase cocoa beans, his wife Elizabeth Gore Hannon sold the company to James Baker in 1780 and it was renamed to the Baker Chocolate Company.

By 1849 (under Walter Baker), the Baker's Chocolate brand had spread to California during the Gold Rush era. Production was limited to one kind of chocolate until 1852, when employee Samuel German created "German's Sweet Chocolate" that had a higher sugar content than previous baking chocolates. In 1957 a Dallas, Texas newspaper printed a cake recipe for "German's Chocolate Cake" based on this chocolate. Subsequent reprints in other newspapers by the company's owner General Foods named it "German chocolate cake".

Chocolate production steadily increased through the century. The trademark logo of La Belle Chocolatière was adopted in 1883 by the fourth-generation familial owner, Henry L. Pierce, step-nephew of Walter Baker. Pierce began advertising Baker's Chocolate heavily in newspapers to increase sales. In 1896, Baker's Chocolate was advertising in around 8,000 newspapers in the United States. The company also advertised using signage and cards in grocery stores, in novels, in street cars and using billboards. Promotional offers of tableware and logo pins helped attract customers. Around the late 1800s, the company began promoting the notion of using chocolate as an ingredient in desserts and for baking.

Following Pierce's death in 1896, the Forbes Syndicate bought the company, which they sold In 1927 to the Postum Cereal Company, later known as General Foods. In 1966 production moved from Dorchester, Massachusetts to Dover, Delaware. The company was passed onto Kraft Foods in 1989 when they acquired General Foods. Baker's is now owned by Kraft Heinz, a company formed by the merger between Kraft Foods and Heinz.

== Products ==
Baker's continues to expand its line of products, focusing on conveniences for the home baker. Some products, such as vanilla extract and cocoa powder, have been discontinued with company turnovers. Other products are available to food service professionals in bulk, such as different kinds of coconut, cocoa drinks, and bulk chocolate.

Baker's most common products:

- German's Sweet Chocolate 'Bar' (48% cacao)
- Semi-sweet chocolate (56% cacao)
- Bittersweet chocolate (66% cacao)
- Unsweetened chocolate (100% cacao)
- Premium white chocolate (0% cacao)
- Dipping chocolate (milk or dark)
- Sweetened Angel Flake coconut
