= Drost =

Drost is a Dutch occupational surname. A drost or drossaard was a kind of bailiff in the Low Countries (see landdrost and seneschal). Notable people with the surname include:

- Epi Drost (1945–1995), Dutch footballer
- Erik Drost (born 1977), Dutch guitarist
- Frank Drost (born 1963), Dutch swimmer
- Henrico Drost (born 1987), Dutch footballer
- Jeff Drost (born 1964), American football player
- Jeroen Drost (born 1987), Dutch footballer
- Jesper Drost (born 1993), Dutch footballer
- Johannes Drost (1880–1954), Dutch swimmer
- John Drost (born 1958), Dutch bobsledder.
- Melissa Drost (born 1985), Dutch actress
- Monique Drost (born 1964), Dutch swimmer
- Nadja Drost, Canadian journalist
- Nico Drost (born 1980), Dutch politician
- Oliver Drost (born 1995), Danish footballer
- Peter Drost (born 1958), Dutch swimmer
- Robert Drost (born 1970), American computer scientist
- Roos Drost (born 1991), Dutch field hockey player
- Rudolf Drost (1892–1971), German ornithologist
- Willem Drost (1633–1659), Dutch painter

== See also ==
- Droste, Dutch chocolate manufacturer
- Droste (surname), people with this surname
