= Hans Schildmacher =

Hans Egon Wilhelm Schildmacher (13 March 1907 - 3 September 1976) was a German zoologist who specialized in ornithology particularly on avian physiology and endocrinology. He served as a professor of zoology at the University of Greifswald.

Hans was born in Magdeburg where his father Otto was a watchmaker. He studied in the local schools and was interested in the animal world and especially through the influence of Paul Rabitz. He founded an ornithological association at Magdeburg in 1923 and in 1924 he was in charge of cattle at Magdeburg Kreuzhorst under August Mertens. He graduated in the natural sciences with studies at Halle and Berlin. In 1931 he began to study Herbst corpuscles with Erwin Stresemann. He later worked at the museum at Hannover and then at Heligoland where he worked with Rudolf Drost. In 1929 he joined the University of Rostock for postdoctoral studies. In 1939 he joined the military service as a military entomologist to help fight malaria in southern Europe. After the Second World War he worked at the University of Greifswald and improved the Hiddensee bird reserve. In 1951 he became a professor and became a full professor of zoology in 1969. He took an active role in bird conservation in East Germany as an expert on the committee of the Kulturbund.
