= Walter Baker & Company =

American producer of chocolate

Walter Baker & Company, Ltd.
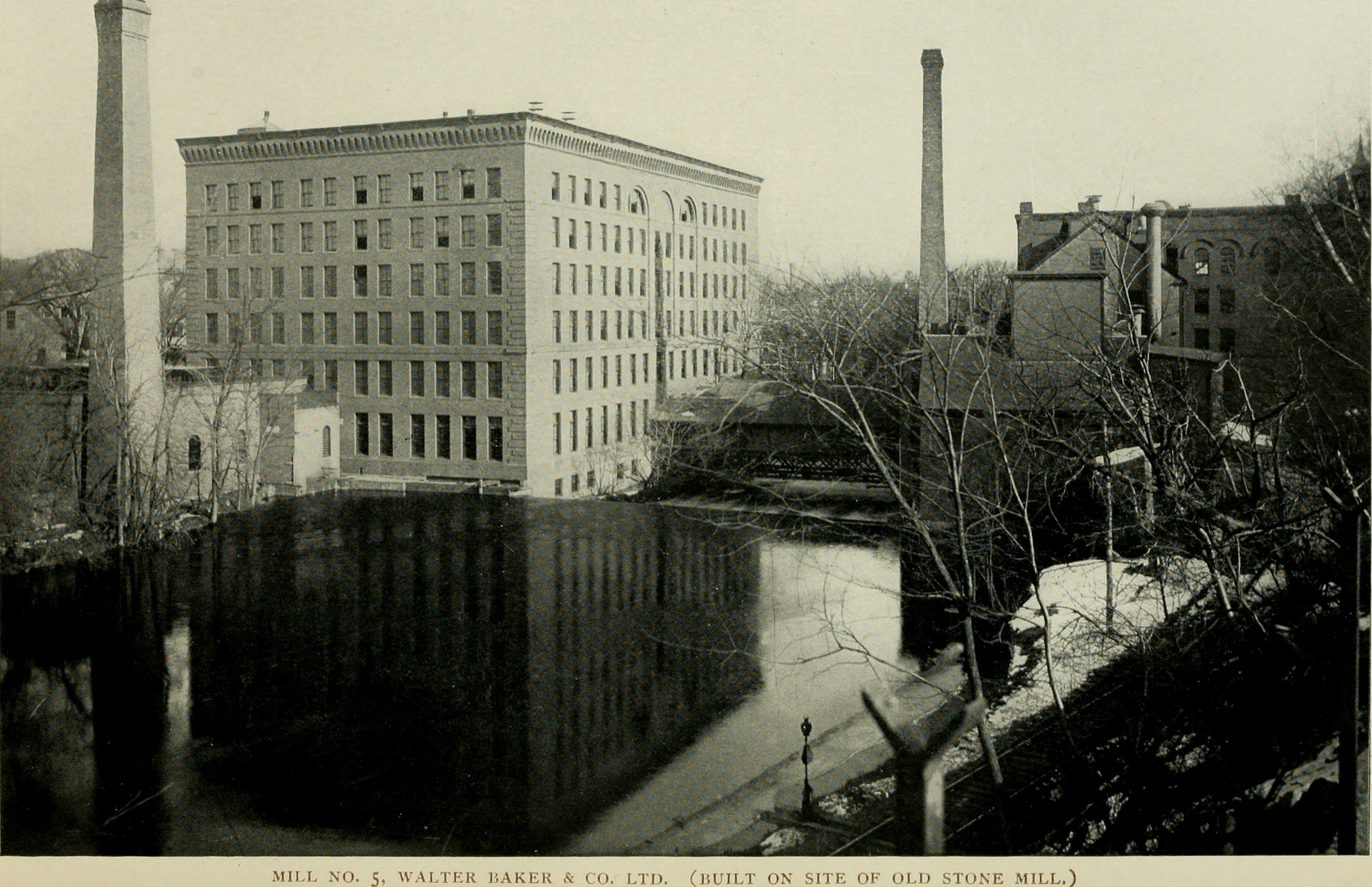
- Baker chocolate factory in 1907
- Type: Limited
- Industry: Food
- Founded: 1780; 246 years ago
- Founder: James Baker
- Defunct: 1995; 31 years ago
- Fate: Merged into Kraft Foods in 1995
- Successor: Kraft Heinz
- Headquarters: Dorchester, Boston, Massachusetts, U.S.
- Products: Chocolate
- Brands: Baker's Chocolate
- Parent: Forbes Syndicate (1896–1927); Postum Cereal/General Foods (1927–1995)

The Baker Chocolate Company was an American company that produced chocolate, headquartered in Dorchester neighborhood of Boston, Massachusetts. It was the first company to produce chocolate in the country. Following the deaths of its founders and officers, the company was sold to the Forbes Syndicate in 1896, which carried on the business until it was sold to Postum Cereal in 1927, which became General Foods two years later.

Acquired by Kraft Foods in 1995, the Baker's Chocolate brand currently belongs to Kraft Heinz.

== History ==
The company was established when a physician named Dr. James Baker met John Hannon on the banks of the Neponset River. Irishman John Hannon was penniless but was a skilled chocolatier, a craft which he had learned in England and which was, until that point, exclusive to Europe. With Baker's help, Hannon set up a business where he produced "Hannon's Best Chocolate" for 15 years. In 1779, Hannon went to the West Indies and never returned. His wife sold the company in 1780 to Dr. Baker, who changed the name to Baker Chocolate Company.

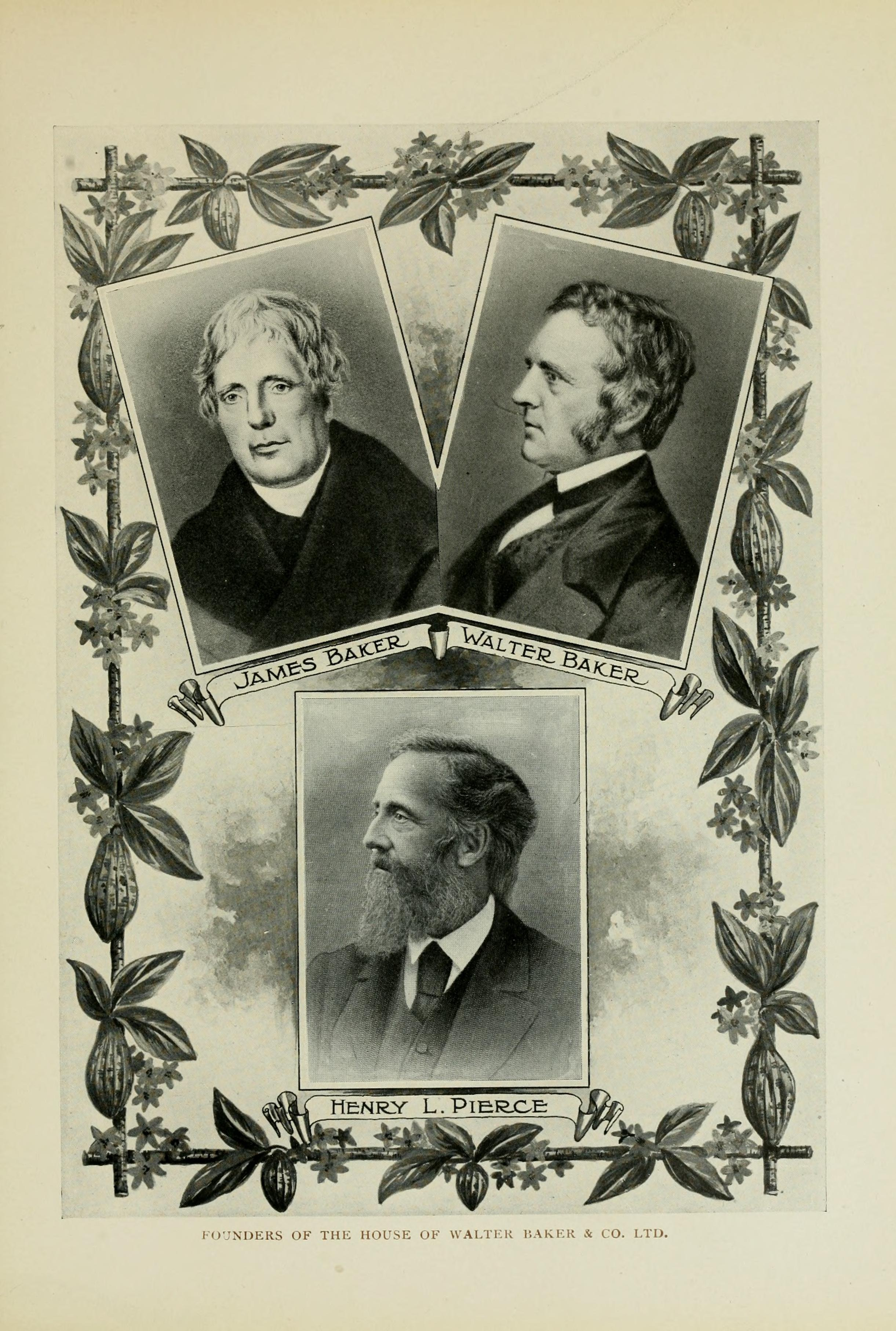
James and Walter Baker (above) gave their name to the company, while Henry Pierce (below) helped them expand the business

Dr. James Baker's son, Edmund (1770–1846), and his son, Colonel Walter (1792–1852), successfully carried on the business. The chocolate was marketed with a guaranteed money-back policy if the customers were not one hundred percent satisfied with their purchase. Colonel Walter Baker had studied law at Harvard College and thus had the name "Baker's" legally protected for future generations of this family business.

After Colonel Walter Baker died, his brother-in-law Sidney Williams took over but died two years later. Henry Lillie Pierce, a stepnephew of Walter Baker, leased the business for the next thirty years. Henry Lillie Pierce expanded the business substantially. He added more buildings for production and found new marketplaces for chocolate products. He exhibited his products at Exhibitions in both the old and new worlds and won an award at the Vienna Exhibition in 1873. Pierce was an influential citizen of Dorchester and politically very active: he was elected mayor of the city of Boston twice, served as US congressman, and in the Massachusetts House of Representatives.

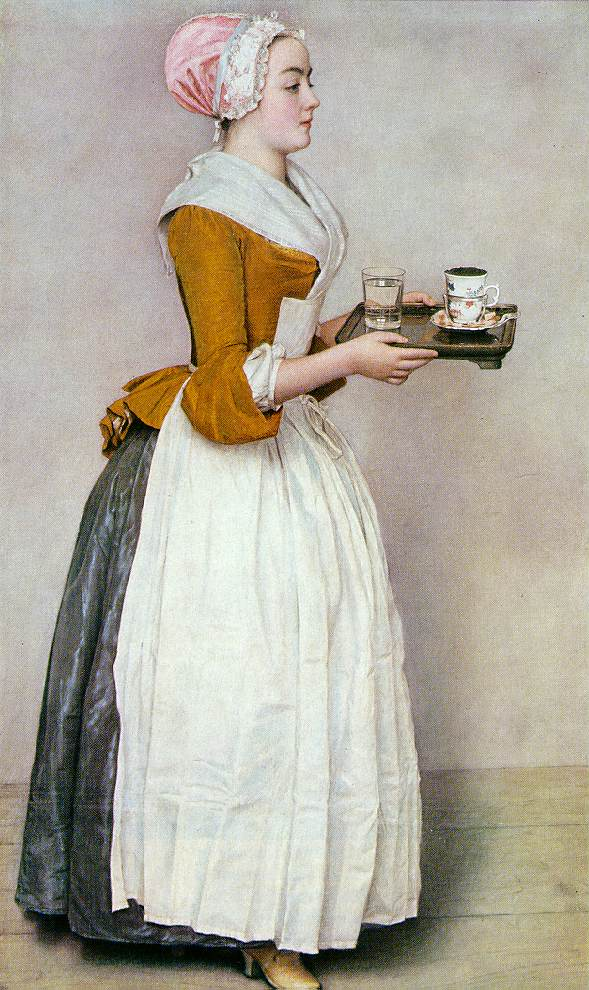
Das Schokoladenmädchen by Jean-Étienne Liotard, 1743-45, inspired the logo of the company, "La Belle Chocolatière"

The logo of the chocolate server, called La Belle Chocolatière, was adopted in 1883 after a painting by the Swiss artist Jean-Étienne Liotard called Das Schokoladenmädchen, which can be found at the Gemäldegalerie Alte Meister (art gallery) in Dresden, Germany. The story of the Schokoladenmädchen is not as clear-cut as published in the recipe pamphlet-book Choice Recipes from 1913. The painting was done in the 1740s at the Vienna court of the Austrian Kaiserin Maria Theresia at a time when Jean-Etienne Liotard had been commissioned to paint both the Kaiser and Kaiserin (empress and emperor). It is said that the model of the Schokoladenmädchen was one of the young ladies at court whose beauty led Liotard to put it on a canvas.

Walter Baker & Company published the story in Choice Recipes, 1913, as follows:

"...There is a romance connected with the charming Viennese girl who served as the model, which is well worth telling. One of the leading journals of Vienna has thrown some light on the Baltauf, or Baldauf, family to which the subject of Liotard's painting belonged. Anna, or Annerl, as she was called by friends and relatives, was the daughter of Melchior Baltauf, a knight, who was living in Vienna in 1760, when Liotard was in that city making portraits of some members of the Austrian Court. It is not clear whether Anna was earning her living as a chocolate bearer at that time or whether she posed as a society belle in that becoming costume; but, be that as it may, her beauty won the love of a prince of the Empire, whose name, Dietrichstein, is known now only because he married the charming girl who was immortalized by a great artist. The marriage caused a great deal of talk in Austrian society at the time, and many different stories have been told about it. The prejudices of caste have always been very strong in Vienna, and a daughter of a knight, even if well-to-do, was not considered a suitable match for a member of the court. It is said that on the wedding day Anna invited the chocolate bearers with whom she had worked or played, and in "sportive joy at her own elevation" offered her hand to them saying, " Behold! now that I am a princess you may kiss my hand." She was probably about twenty years of age when the portrait was painted in 1760, and she lived until 1825..."

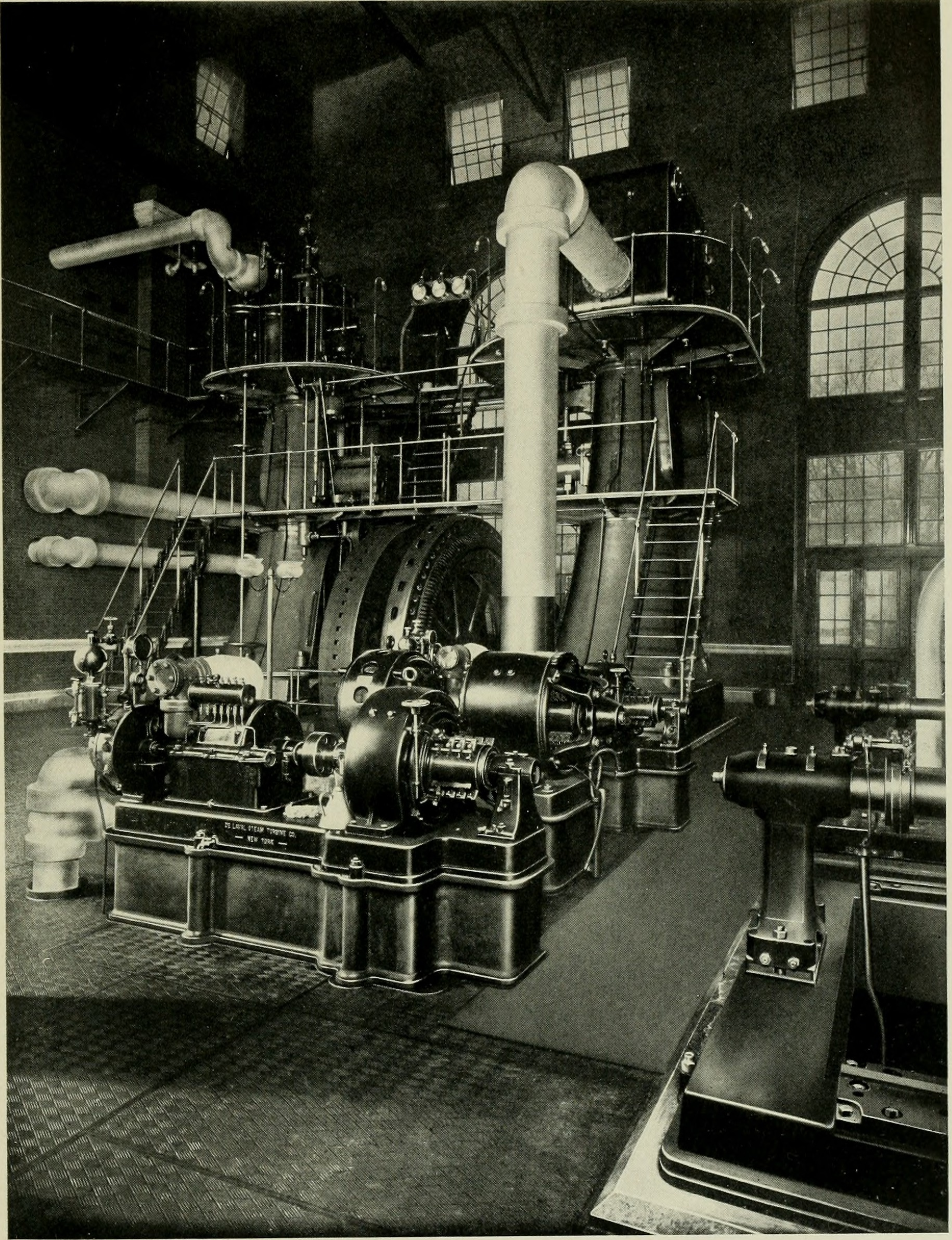
Interior of the Baker factory in 1907

The company was sold in 1896, following the death of Pierce, to the Forbes Syndicate. They greatly expanded the factory, adding the Powder House, the Ware Mill, the Preston Mill, the Forbes Mill, and the Baker Administrative Building over the next thirty years. The Forbes Syndicate advertised Baker's chocolate in magazines such as the Youth Companion, Booklovers' Magazine, Red Book Magazine, and Liberty.

The Forbes Syndicate had the idea to reinforce loyalty to the brand by giving out coupons that could be redeemed for bone china services, bookends, spoons, and serving trays as well as the very popular cookbook, which was published every year.

The Postum Cereal Company bought Walter Baker & Company in 1927, Postum became General Foods two years later and moved the production to Delaware in 1965. By 1995, Walter Baker & Company was incorporated into Kraft Foods, now Kraft Heinz. The former Dorchester factory buildings now make up most of the Dorchester-Milton Lower Mills Industrial District.

== See also ==
- Baking chocolate
