= Heinrich-Droste-Literaturpreis =

Literary award

Heinrich-Droste-Literaturpreis was a literary prize of Germany in 1956.
