= Droste (surname) =

Droste is a German surname, derived from a medieval court appointment named Drost. Notable people with the surname include:

- Annette von Droste-Hülshoff (1797–1848), German poet, writer, and composer
- Clemens August Droste zu Vischering (1773–1845), German baron and Roman Catholic Archbishop of Cologne
- Daniel Droste (born 1980), German musician
- Dao Droste (born 1952), Vietnamese-German artist
- Ed Droste (born 1978), American singer-songwriter, musician, and licensed therapist
- Edward C. Droste (born 1951), American businessman
- Elmer Droste (1895–1972), American lawyer, politician, and Army officer
- Gottfried von Droste (1908–1992), German physical chemist
- Jean Droste (born 1994), South African rugby union player
- Johannes Droste (1886–1963), Dutch mathematician
- Louise Droste-Roggemann (1865–1945), German painter
- Sebastian Droste (1898–1927), German poet, actor, and dancer
- Wiglaf Droste (1961–2019), German poet and satirical writer
- Wout Droste (born 1989), Dutch footballer

== See also ==
- Droste zu Vischering, a Westphalian noble family
- Mary of the Divine Heart (born Maria Droste zu Vischering; 1863–1899), German noblewoman and Roman Catholic religious sister
- Volmars Drosted (1890–1956), Danish architect
- Drost, people with this Dutch surname
