= Droste Park =

- Location within Gauteng Location within South Africa
- Coordinates: 26.210°S 28.068°E
- Country: South Africa
- Province: Gauteng
- Municipality: City of Johannesburg
- Main Place: Johannesburg

Area
  - Total: 0.39 km^{2} (0.15 sq mi)

Population (2011)
  - Total: 2,995
  - Density: 7,700/km^{2} (20,000/sq mi)

Racial makeup (2011)
  - Black African: 99.7%
  - Coloured: 0.1%
  - Indian/Asian: 0.0%
  - White: 0.2%
  - Other: 0.0%

First languages (2011)
  - Zulu: 95.0%
  - Southern Ndebele: 1.5%
  - Other: 3.5%
- Time zone: UTC+2 (SAST)
- Postal code (street): 2094

Droste Park is a suburb of Johannesburg, South Africa. It is located in Region F of the City of Johannesburg Metropolitan Municipality.
