= The Chocolate Girl =

Pastel by Jean-Étienne Liotard

- La Belle Chocolatière (French)
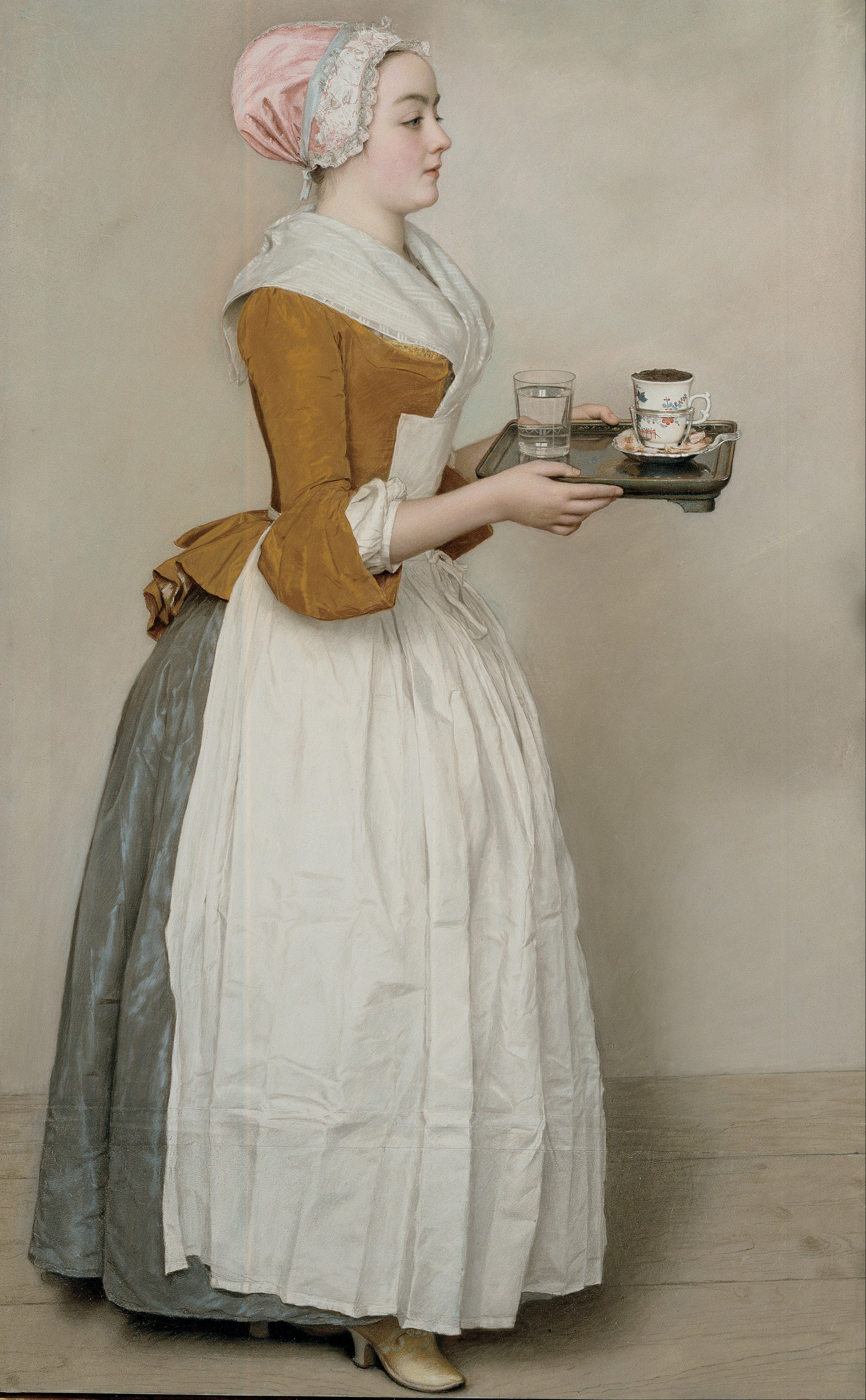
- Artist: Jean-Étienne Liotard
- Year: circa 1743-44
- Type: Pastel on vellum
- Dimensions: 82.5 cm × 52.5 cm (32.5 in × 20.7 in)
- Location: Gemäldegalerie Alte Meister; Dresden

The Chocolate Girl or The Chocolate Girl of Vienna (French: La Belle Chocolatière, German: Das Schokoladenmädchen) is one of the best known pastels of the Genevan artist Jean-Étienne Liotard, which is in the collection of the Gemäldegalerie Alte Meister in Dresden, Germany. The pastel depicts a maid carrying a lacquer serving tray holding a glass of water and a porcelain cup filled with drinking chocolate. The maid and the objects in the picture are executed with almost photographic accuracy, and the background consists only of a light-colored wall and the floor of plain floorboards. The Chocolate Girl was highly praised by Liotard's contemporaries.

== Description ==
Both the lacquer tray and the porcelain cup are derived from Japanese models. The chocolate drink is likely intended for an eminent person, as chocolate was in the 18th century still an expensive luxury only available to the upper class. The serving tray is a gallery tray, i.e. it has a raised rim to protect against items slipping off the tray. The cup in which the chocolate is served is a trembleuse, supposedly used by people with shaking hands to avoid spilling, but in the 18th century strongly associated with drinking chocolate, then brewed rather strong and frothy. The Vienna Porcelain Manufactory was perhaps one the largest producers of trembleuse cups in the 18th century. Around the saucer is some beige material, perhaps food or a napkin.

The girl's headdress has been described variously as a cap cover or a kind of colorful regional cap. The girl's apron features a small pinafore.

== Identity of the model ==
In most literature described as a "maid", it is possible that the model was a banker's daughter from Vienna, Charlotte or Nannerl Baldauf, later Countess Dietrichstein. The back of an 18th-century reduced copy in Orleans House near London has an old label saying: "Portrait of Charlotte Baldauf. Drawn by Liotard during his stay at the house of Mr Baldauf, banker of Vienna. Charlotte Baldauf became Countess Drietrichstein [sic]. From the collection of Lord Taunton (E.Labouchere)", who received his peerage in 1859, and died in 1869.

== Provenance ==
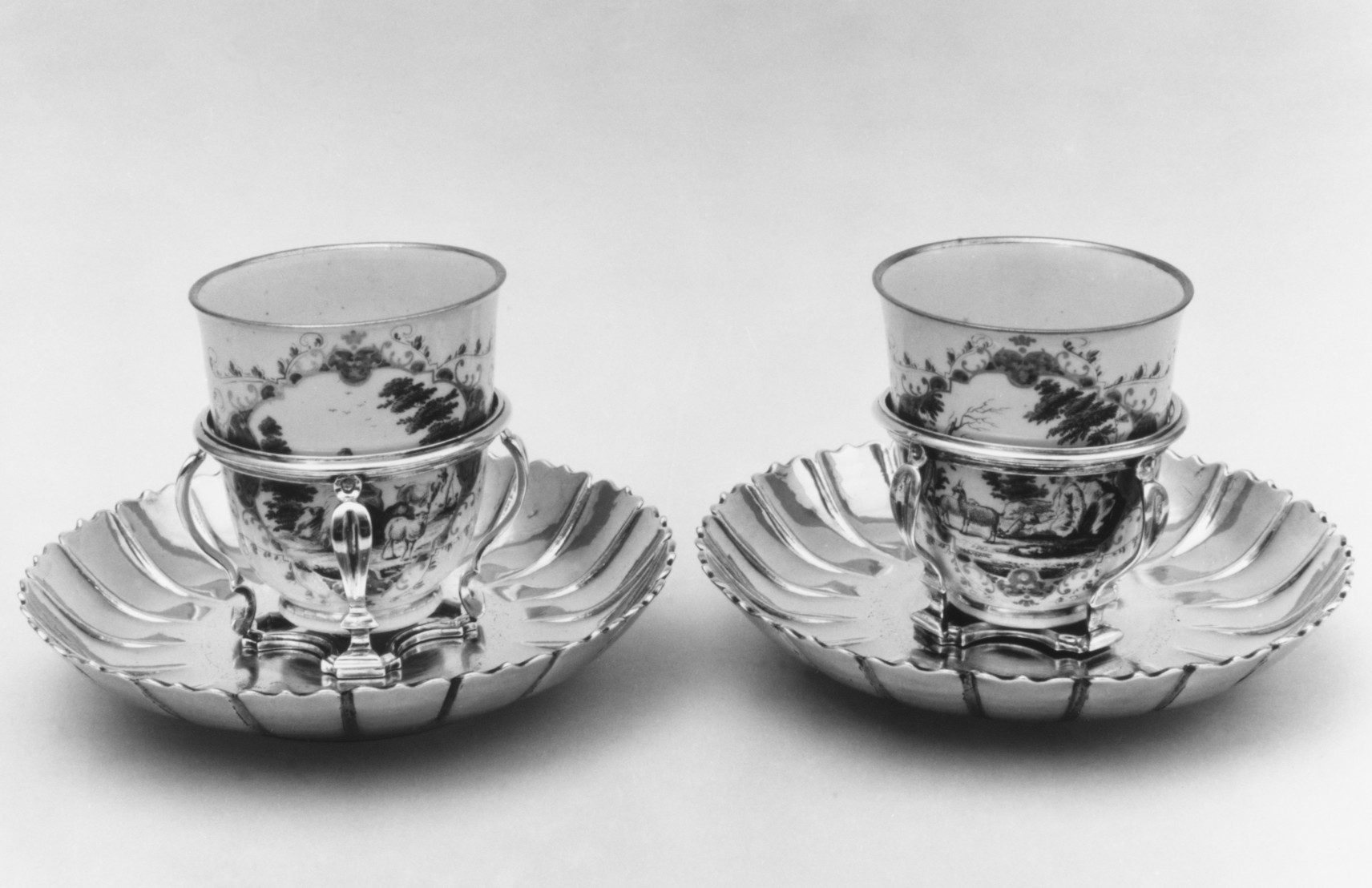
Comparable pair of cups by Doccia porcelain, Florence (after 1735) and silver-gilt stands by Paul de Lamerie (1713-14), London

While in Venice, the Italian writer and art agent Francesco Algarotti purchased the pastel from the artist on 3 February 1745. Algarotti was making the acquisition on behalf of Augustus III, King of Poland and Elector of Saxony, for his art collection in Dresden. It is unclear whether Liotard was at the time of the purchase already in Venice to set up a lottery, but he was later that year as he then painted Algarotti's portrait.

In a letter dated 13 February 1751 to his friend Pierre-Jean Mariette Algarotti wrote:

I have bought a pastel picture about three feet high by the celebrated Liotard. It shows a young German chambermaid in profile, carrying a tray with a glass of water and a cup of chocolate. The picture is almost devoid of shadows, with a pale background, the light being furnished by two windows reflected in the glass. It is painted in half-tones with imperceptible graduations of light and with a perfect modelling...and although it is a European picture it could appeal to the Chinese who, as you know, are sworn enemies of shadows. With regard to the perfection of the work, it is a Holbein in pastel.

Since 1855 the picture is part of the Gemäldegalerie Alte Meister in Dresden. During World War II the Germans transported it to Königstein Fortress for better protection. The delicate pastel managed to survive the cold and damp there and was brought back to Dresden when the Germans retreated from the advancing Soviet troops. After World War II, the painting was briefly in possession of the Soviet Union.

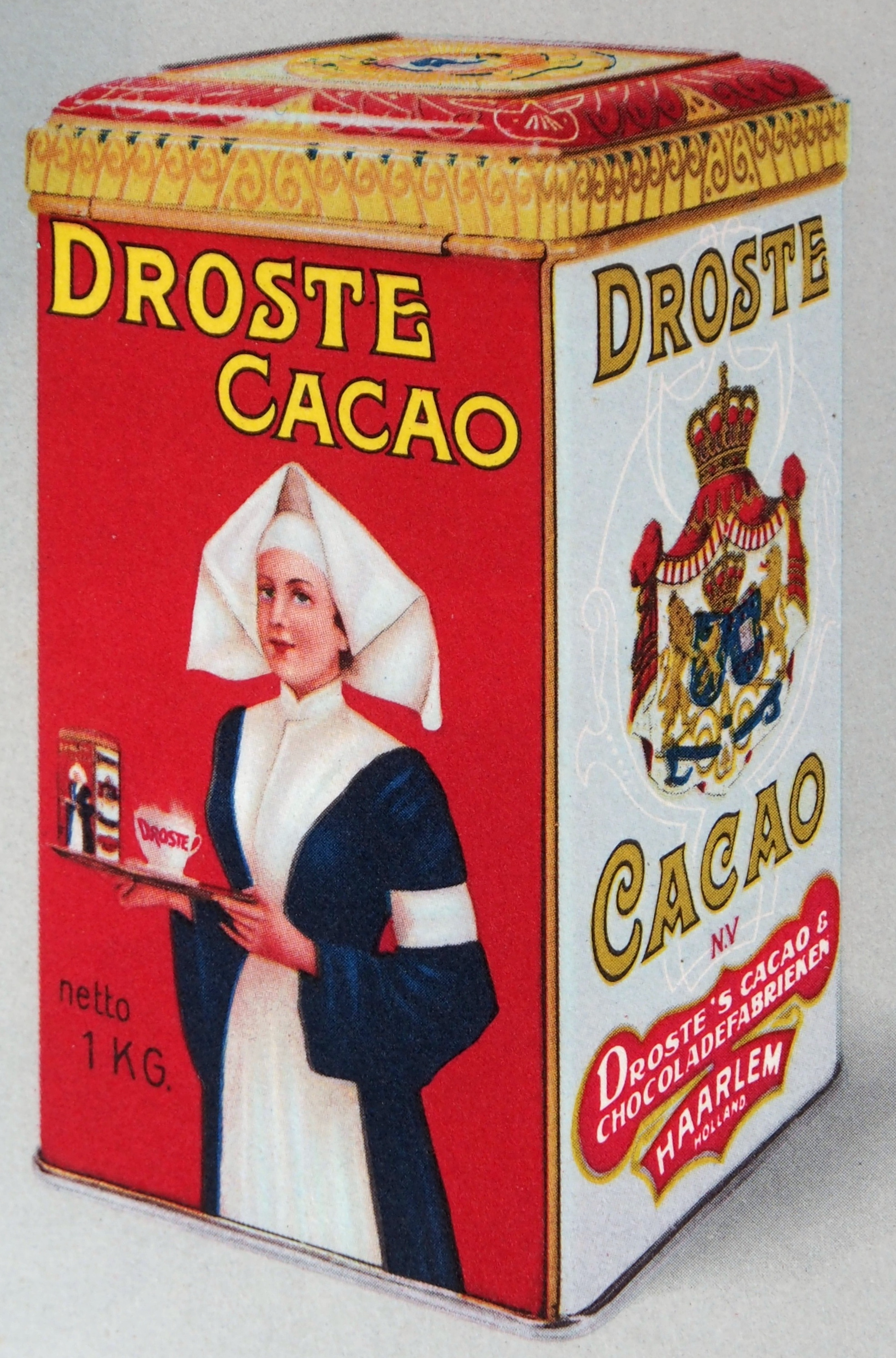
Droste's cocoa tin

== Use in marketing ==
In 1862 the American Baker's Chocolate Company obtained the rights to use the pastel.

Around 1900, The Chocolate Girl served as inspiration for the commercial illustration of the "nurse" that appeared on Droste's cocoa tins. This was most probably a work of the commercial artist Jan (Johannes) Misset. According to Droste, "The illustration indicated the wholesome effect of chocolate milk and became inextricably bound with the name Droste."
