= Rudolf Drost =

German ornithologist and zoologist

Rudolf Karl Theodor Drost (19 August 1892, Oldenburg - 3 December 1971, Wilhelmshaven) was a German ornithologist best known for his studies on bird migration conducted at the Heligoland observatory.

Drost was the only child of Dr Karl Drost and Clara née Fetköter. He studied at the Mariengymnasium and later at the University of Tübingen and later at Göttingen. His education was interrupted by the war and he was wounded during service. He received a Doctoral degree in 1923 for studying crustaceans and was appointed in the Prussian Biological Station on Heligoland where he continued the work of Hugo Weigold. In 1926 he was made director of the Helgoland Vogelwarte and became a Professor in 1932. He organized student observers along the coast and his capture and ringing of birds also led to improved identification and sexing techniques. He also compared migration in the Snake Island (Schlangeninsel) in the Black Sea off Romania in 1928 and later studied the effects of weather, day length and hormonal factors (with the assistance of H. Schildmacher) in migration. One of his studies included keeping birds in Faraday cages to find that the migratory onset was not influenced by changes in the Earth's magnetic field. He championed bird conservation and created large-scale ringing networks and helped found the magazine Vogelzug.

Drost was married to Ellen née Scheit of Berlin and had three daughters and one son. Drost was an honorary member of the British Ornithologists' Union and served as honorary chairman for the German Section of the International Council for Bird Preservation.
