= Baking chocolate =

Chocolate intended for use in baking

Baking chocolate, unsweetened, squares
Nutritional value per 100 g (3.5 oz)
- Energy: 2,680 kJ (640 kcal)
- Carbohydrates: 28.4 g
- Sugars: 0.91
- Dietary fiber: 16.6 g
- Fat: 52.3 g
- Protein: 14.3
- Phenylalanine: 0.525 g
- Tyrosine: 0.425 g
- Other constituents: Quantity
- Water: 1.34 g
- Caffeine: 80 mg
- Theobromine: 1300 mg
- Link to USDA Database entry
- ^{†}Percentages estimated using US recommendations for adults.

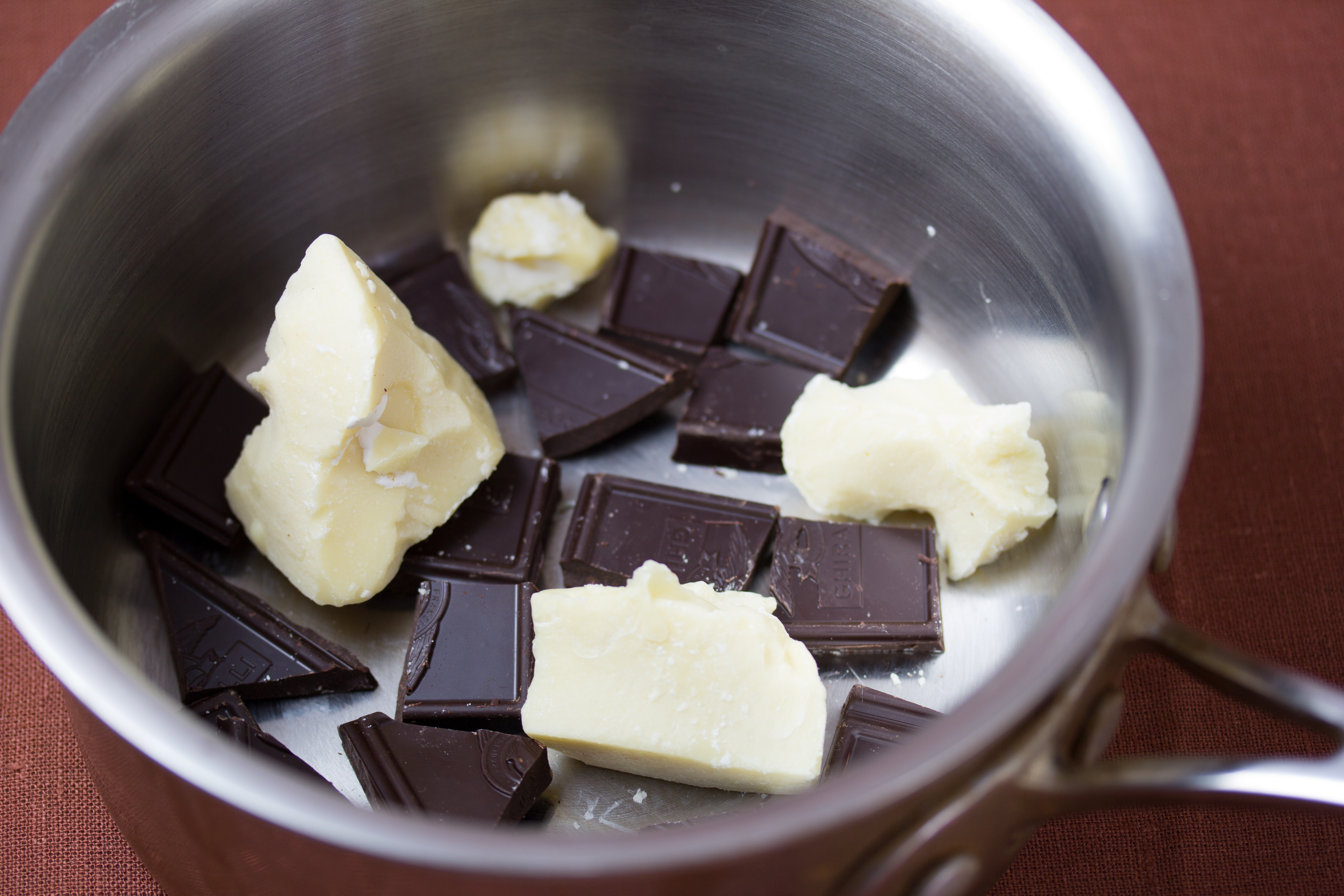
White baking chocolate may be mixed with dark baking chocolate to make it sweeter.

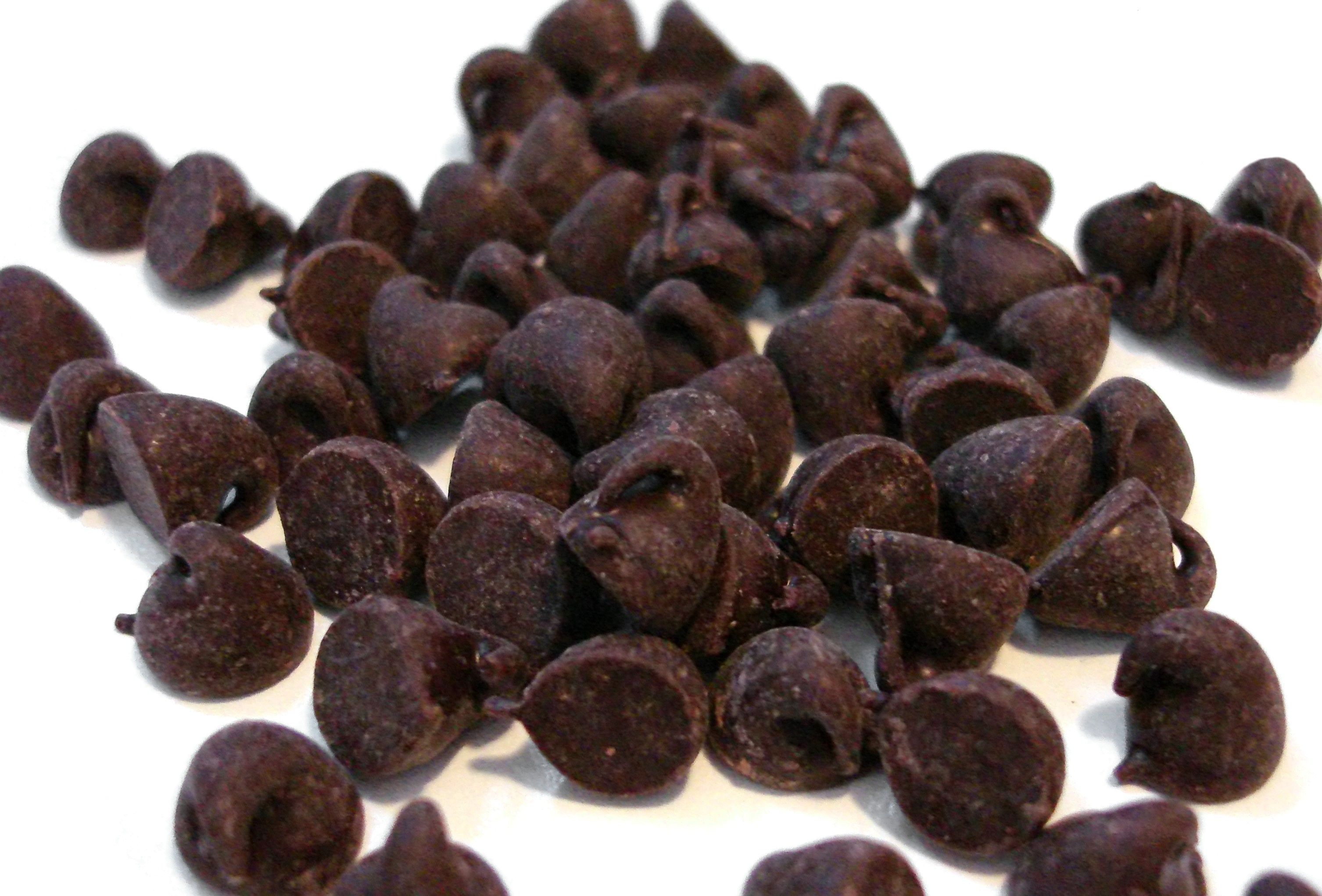
Semi-sweet chocolate chips

Baking chocolate, or cooking chocolate, is chocolate intended to be used for baking and in sweet foods that may or may not be sweetened. Dark chocolate, milk chocolate, and white chocolate are produced and marketed as baking chocolate. However, lower quality baking chocolate may not be as flavorful compared to higher-quality chocolate, and may have a different mouthfeel.

== Production ==
Modern manufactured baking chocolate is typically formed from chocolate liquor formed into bars or chocolate chips. Baking chocolate may be of a lower quality compared to other types of chocolate, and may have part of the cocoa butter replaced with other fats that do not require tempering. This type of baking chocolate may be easier to handle compared to those that have not had their cocoa butter content lowered.

== Varieties ==
It is typically prepared in unsweetened, bittersweet, semisweet and sweet varieties, depending on the amount of added sugar.

Recipes that include unsweetened baking chocolate typically use a significant amount of sugar. Bittersweet baking chocolate must contain 35 percent chocolate liquor or higher. Most baking chocolates have at least a 50% cocoa content, with the remaining content usually being mostly sugar.

Sweet varieties may be referred to as "sweet baking chocolate" or "sweet chocolate". Sweet baking chocolate contains more sugar than bittersweet and semisweet varieties, and semisweet varieties contain more sugar than bittersweet varieties. Sweet and semisweet baking chocolate is prepared with a chocolate liquor content between 15 and 35 percent.

The table below denotes the four primary varieties of baking chocolate.

Type	Content	Sources
Unsweetened	Contains no sugar, and contains 99% chocolate liquor or cocoa solids.	
Bittersweet	Usually has less sugar and more chocolate liquor compared to semisweet varieties.	
Semisweet	Has less sugar than sweet varieties. In Europe, a regulation exists stating that semisweet varieties must contain more sugar and less chocolate liquor compared to bittersweet varieties. No such regulation exists in the United States, and due to this, semisweet and bittersweet varieties can vary in sweetness and chocolate liquor content. In the U.S., bittersweet varieties are even sometimes sweeter than semisweet varieties.	
Sweet	Has the most sugar.	

== Manufacturers ==
Manufacturers of baking chocolate include Baker's Chocolate, Callebaut, Fazer, Ghirardelli, Guittard, The Hershey Company, Lindt, Menier, and Valrhona.

== See also ==
- Types of chocolate

== Bibliography ==
- Sammarco, A. M. (2011). The Baker Chocolate Company: A Sweet History. History Press. ISBN 978-1-61423-113-4. 136 pages.
