= Droste =

Dutch cocoa and chocolate manufacturer

Droste B.V.
- Type: Besloten Vennootschap
- Industry: Confectionery
- Founded: 1863; 163 years ago in Haarlem
- Founder: Gerardus J. Droste
- Headquarters: Cracow, Poland
- Products: Chocolate
- Parent: Wawel SA
- Website: droste.nl

Droste (Dutch: [ˈdrɔstə]) is a Dutch chocolate manufacturer headquartered in Kraków, Poland.

The brand lends its name to the Droste effect, which is the effect of a picture recursively appearing within itself. The name is a reference to Droste's cocoa tins, whose artwork features a depiction of the tin itself.

== History ==
Droste was founded by Gerardus Johannes Droste in 1863 in the city of Haarlem. The company started as a confectionery business selling various types of candy, including the Droste chocolate pastilles that are still being sold today. Because of the growing reputation, the firm G.J. Droste opened its first factory in 1890. The entire chocolate making process took place in the same building as where the retail store was located. In 1891, the factory was relocated to the Spaarne river due to lack of room in the old building. This new location was favourable because the raw materials could now be delivered by boat. Likewise, the shipping of finished products was done on water, improving the distribution process.

In 1897, the leadership of the Droste factory was handed over to the sons of Gerardus J. Droste. In the meantime, Droste's assortment had grown to numerous cocoa and chocolate products, the famous Dutch chocolate letters included. The company had also been winning a significant market share in both the Netherlands and foreign countries, in spite of the competition from larger chocolate manufacturers. In 1898 Droste officially acquired the right to bear the coat of arms of queen dowager Emma. After the turn of the century the company had been exporting its products to Belgium, Germany and France, and in 1905 it entered the American market.

=== The nurse ===
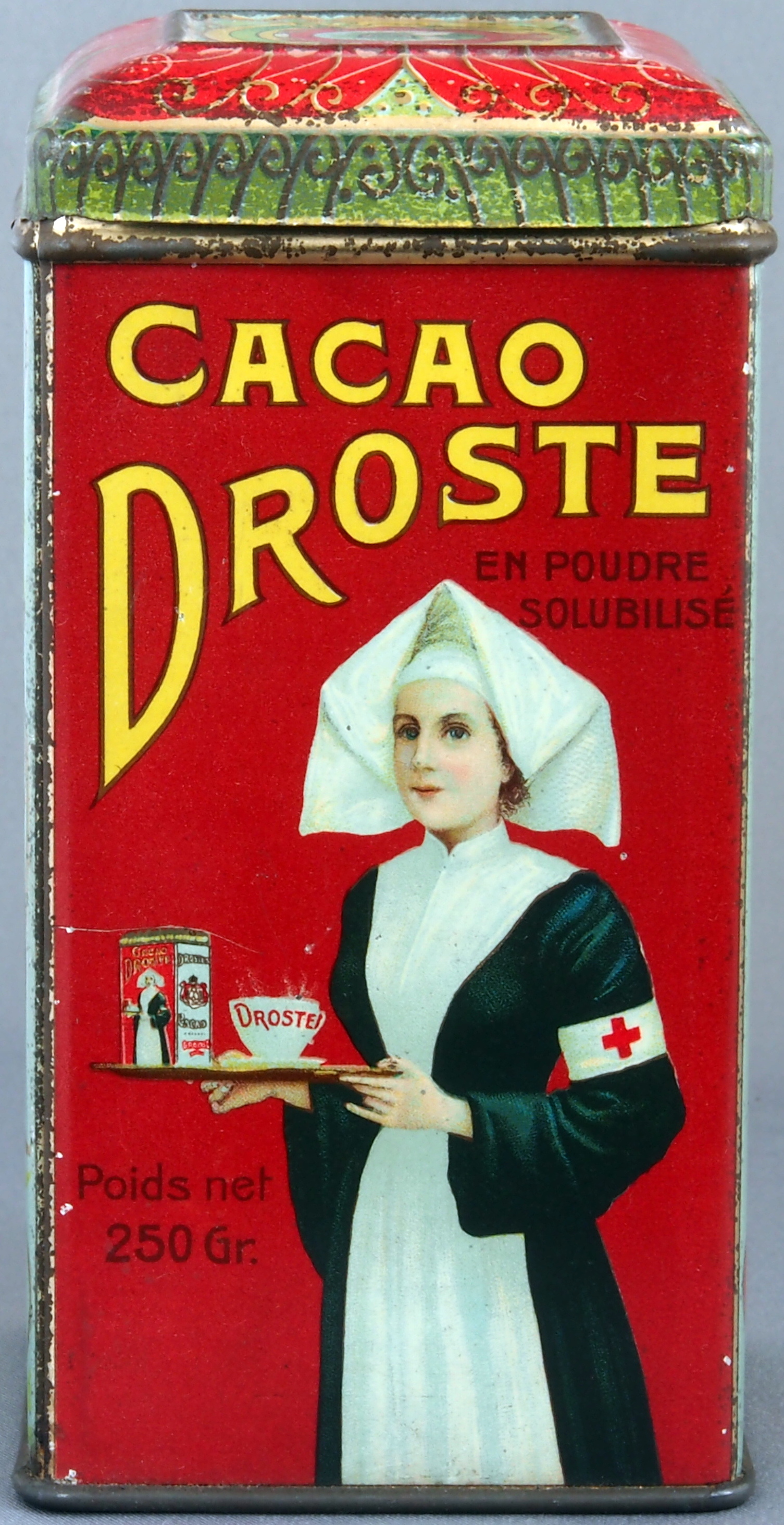
Droste packaging illustration from around 1900. The image is well known for symbolising what became known as the Droste effect.

The famous illustration of the woman in nurse clothes, holding a plate with a cup of milk and a Droste cocoa package, first appeared on Droste products around the year 1900. It is believed that this illustration was created by Jan (Johannes) Misset, being inspired by a pastel known as La Belle Chocolatière ("The Pretty Chocolate Girl"). The image would proclaim the wholesome effect of chocolate milk and became inseparable from the Droste brand. The illustration reappears on the cocoa package held by the nurse, inducing a recursive visual effect known today as the Droste effect.

=== First and Second World War ===
During the First World War raw materials were hard to come by leading to serious production difficulties. When the war was over, the leadership of Gerardus Johannes Droste junior slowly saw the company's production and turnover improve. In 1920 the firm was turned into a public limited company called Droste's Cacao- en Chocoladefabrieken N.V. and by the year 1930 more than 800 employees were working in the factory at the Spaarne. At that time, a group of 25 salesmen was travelling through the Netherlands to promote Droste products to confectionery shops. The brand name's familiarity did not remain limited to the Netherlands as it became increasingly known abroad, resulting in the establishment of Droste offices all over the world such as in London, Paris, Prague, New York, Chicago and Boston. From 1920 until 1940, Droste products were distributed across the world by ships and trains.

In 1932, Droste was hit again by a setback, this time due to a stock market crash. As a result, the company was forced to reduce the working week from 48 hours to 42.5 hours. It became worse during the Second World War, when Allied aircraft bombardment caused considerable damage to the company's cardboard department. This led to the rapid decline of production and sales, which eventually stopped altogether.

=== After the war ===
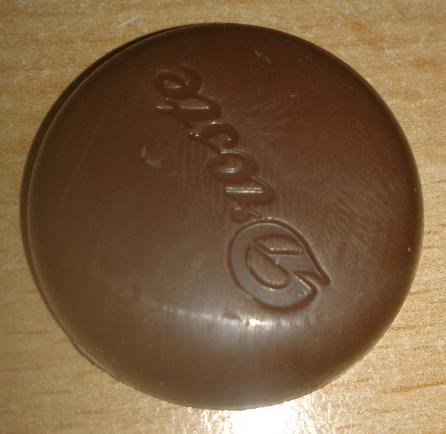
A Droste chocolate pastille

Once again, Droste recovered from the war after 1945 although it took some time to achieve the same level of production and distribution as before the Second World War. Raw materials were still scarce, preventing the company from exporting its products since the desired quality could not be attained. Products were only sold on the home market. This changed five years later, when quality products could once again be supplied to both the home and foreign markets. In the meantime, in 1947, the founder's grandsons Jan and Martinus Droste had been appointed managers. During their leadership the business flourished and by the early 1960s Droste had over 1000 employees. The company exported 40% of the production to 60 different countries, and in 1961 a new cocoa factory was opened.

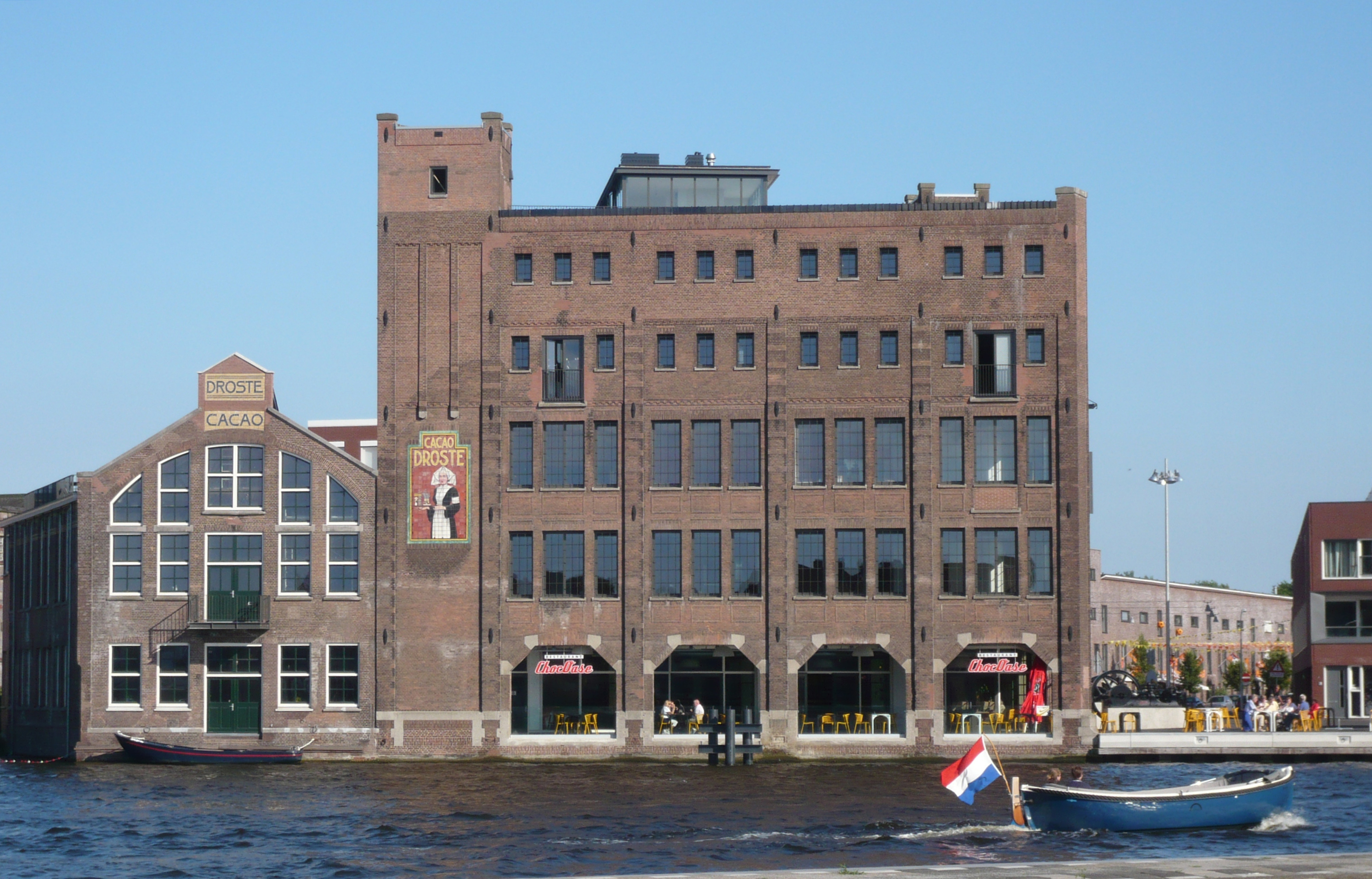
The former Droste factory at the Spaarne river in Haarlem, 2010. It was converted into a residence building in 2008

In the year 1964 the company received the "Royal" designation and was renamed to Koninklijke Droste Fabrieken N.V. In this period, most of the production process was automated, reducing the manual labour considerably. In 1975 the company became part of food and tobacco group Van Nelle, after inheritor widow J. van Nelle took over Droste's share capital. With this, the family company was no longer independent. At that time, Van Nelle was jointly owned by the New York company Standard Brands and despite the incorporation of Droste, the Droste brand name continued to be a trademark. In 1977 Droste became a direct part of Standard Brands. Because the company was now owned by an American company, the "Royal" title could no longer be used and had to be removed. As a result, the company's name was changed to Droste Fabrieken B.V.

=== Recent history ===
The production of Droste was moved to Vaassen in 1986. The old factory in Haarlem continued to be used for production under the name Dutch Cocoa & Chocolate Company B.V., but in 1988 a new factory was opened in Vaassen. In 1990, Droste changed ownership again and was bought by sugar and food concern CSM. By making dynamic and progressive commercials for Droste, CSM provided a rejuvenation of Droste's image.

In 1997 Droste was sold to Hosta. Under its current name Droste B.V. the company operates as an independent business unit in Vaassen, although it is owned by Hosta. Since this latest take-over, sales have gone up considerably and Droste has become one of the largest producers of cocoa in the Netherlands.

The latest chapter in the brand's history began in November 2025, when the Polish confectionery company Wawel S.A. acquired the rights to the Droste trademark. Consequently, the production of Droste products was relocated to Dobczyce, Poland, and the registered office address was changed to Kraków, Poland, where the new brand owner, Wawel S.A., is headquartered.

== Products gallery ==
=== Chocolate packaging ===
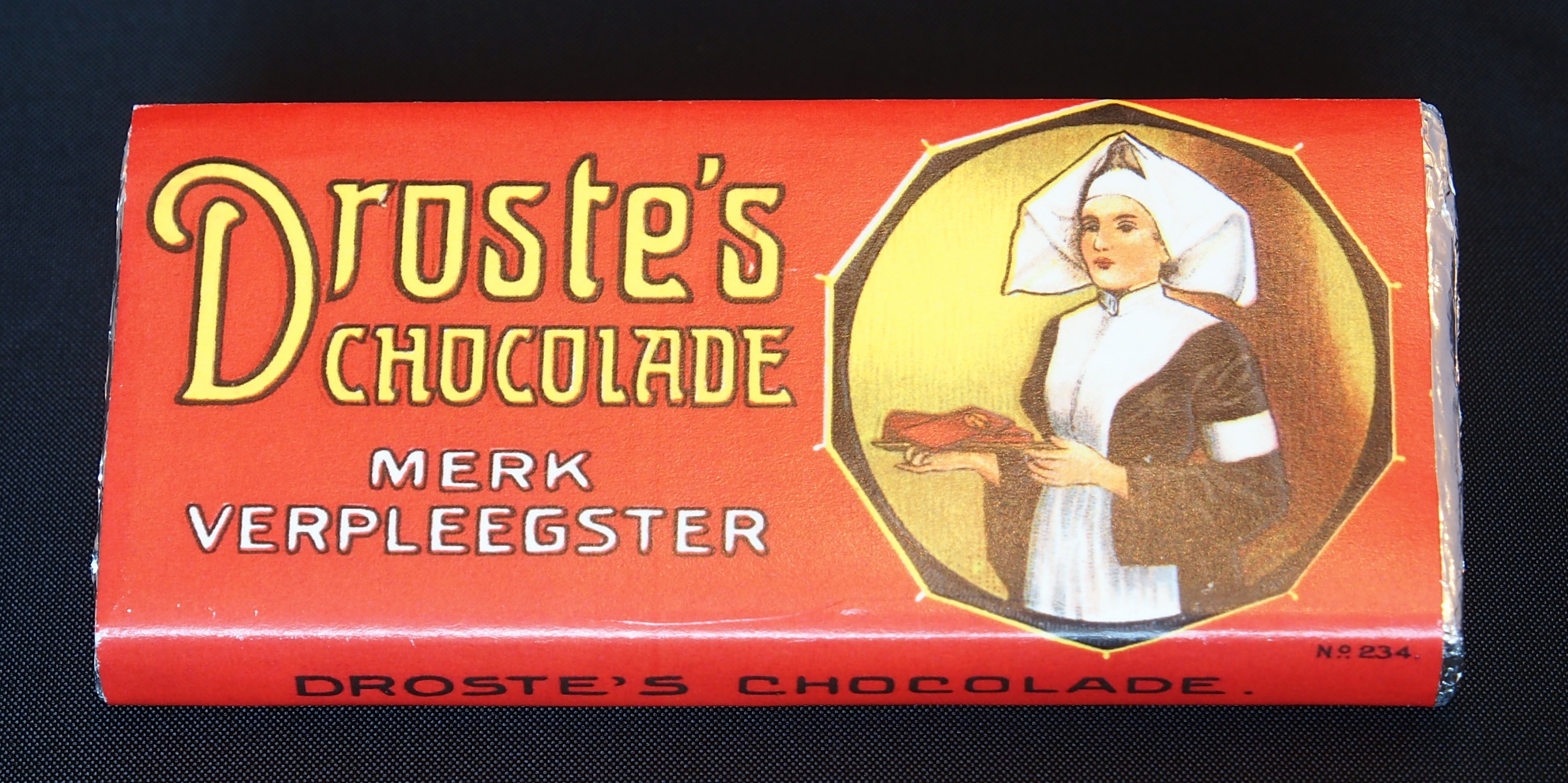

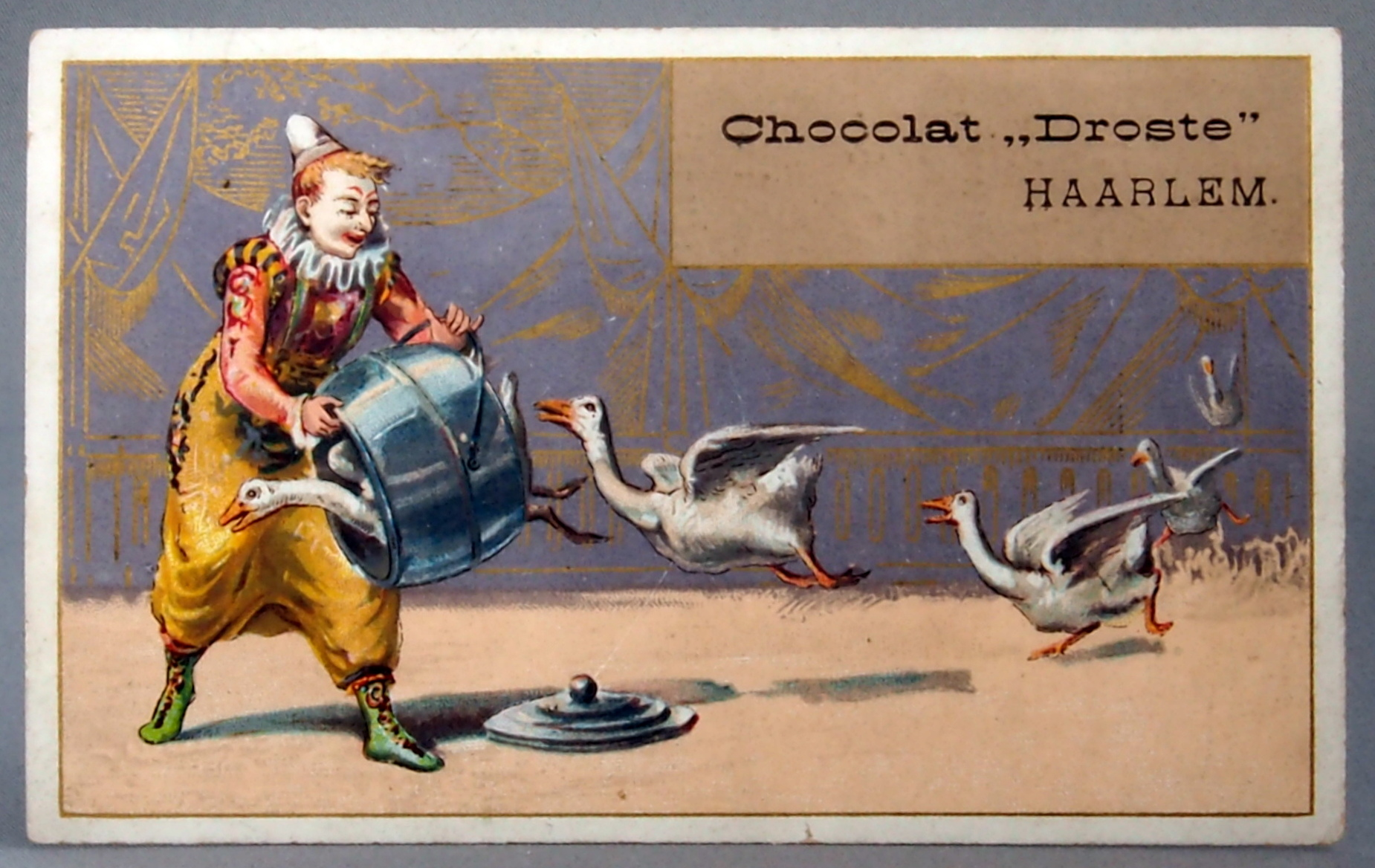

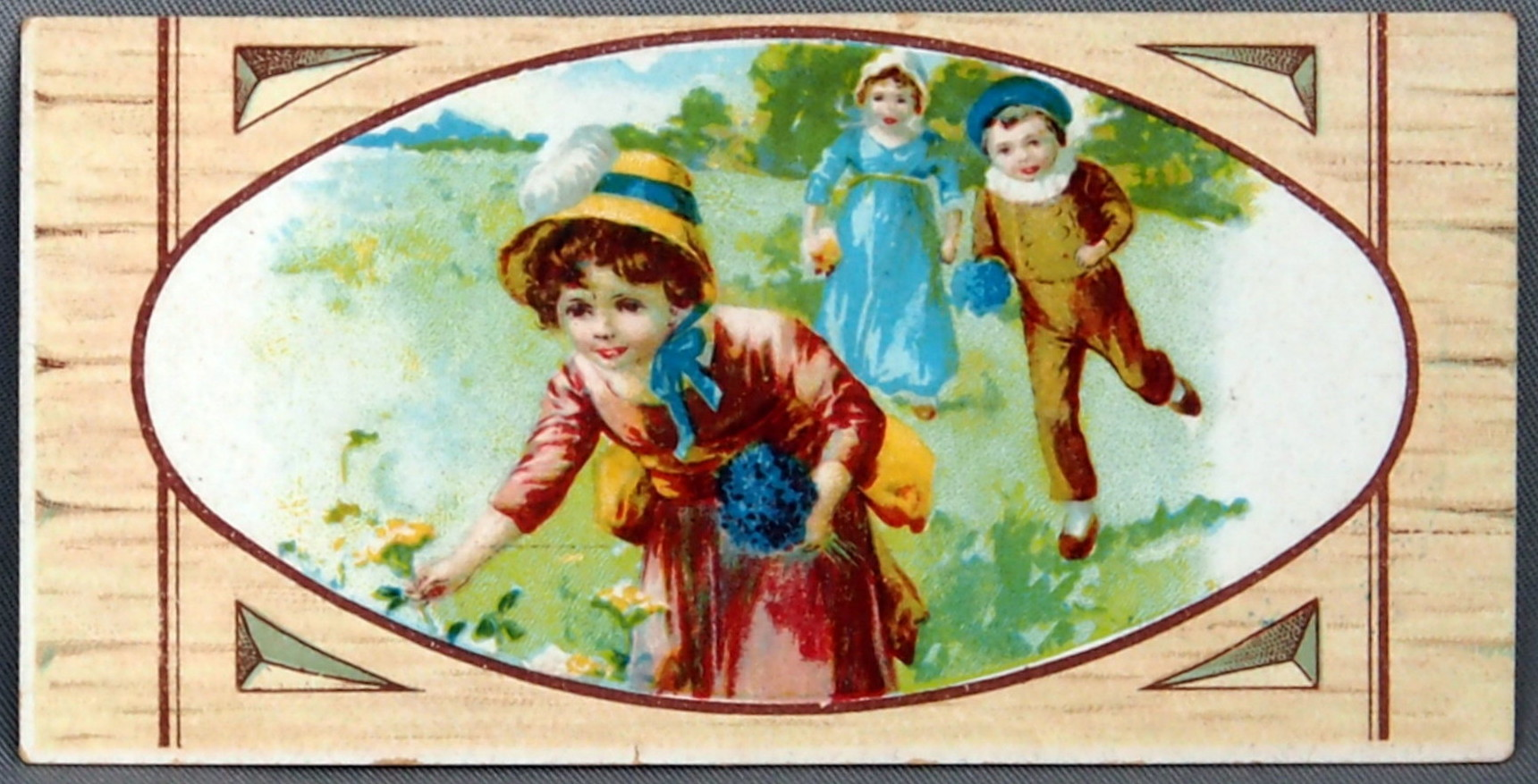

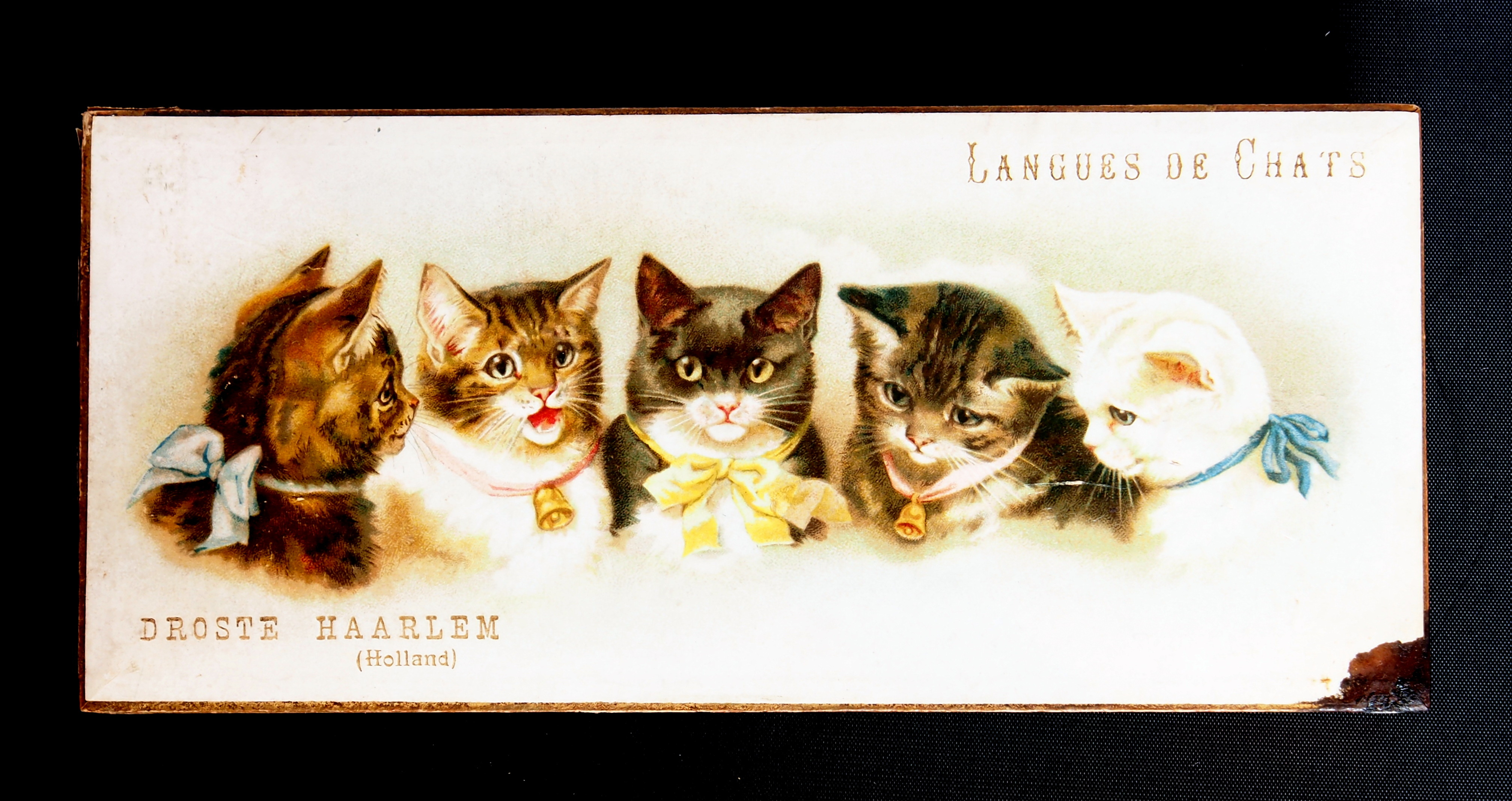

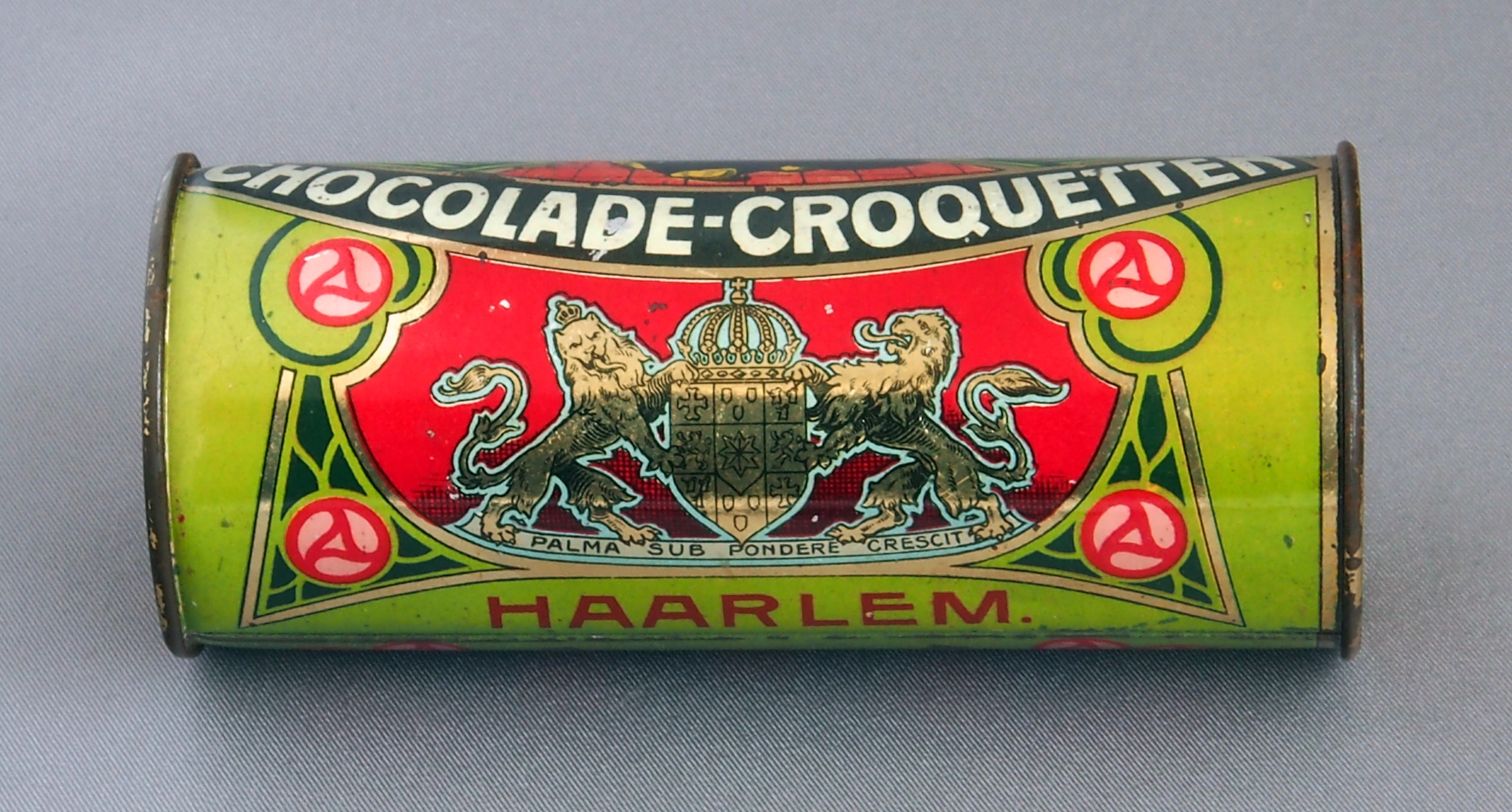

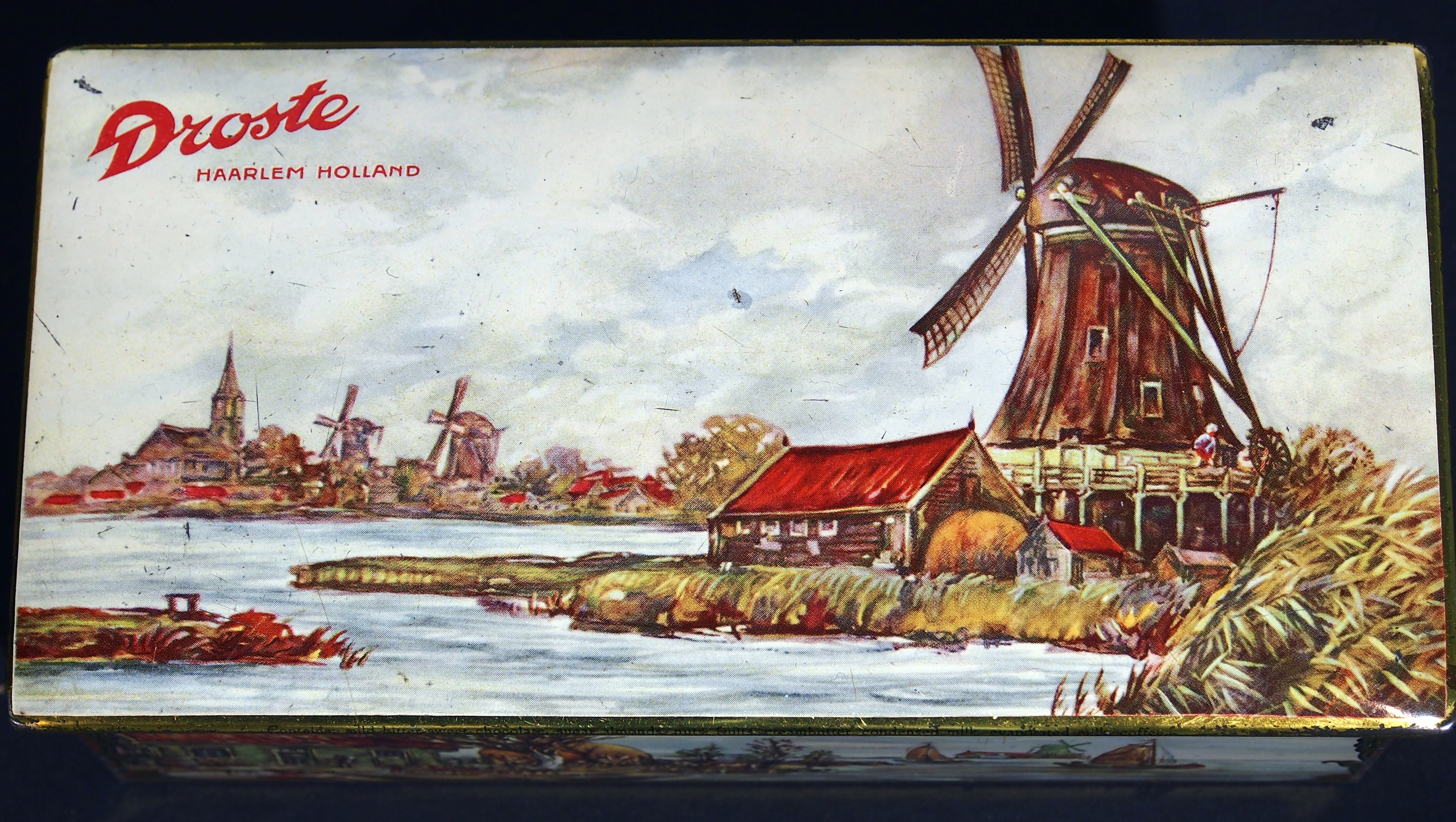

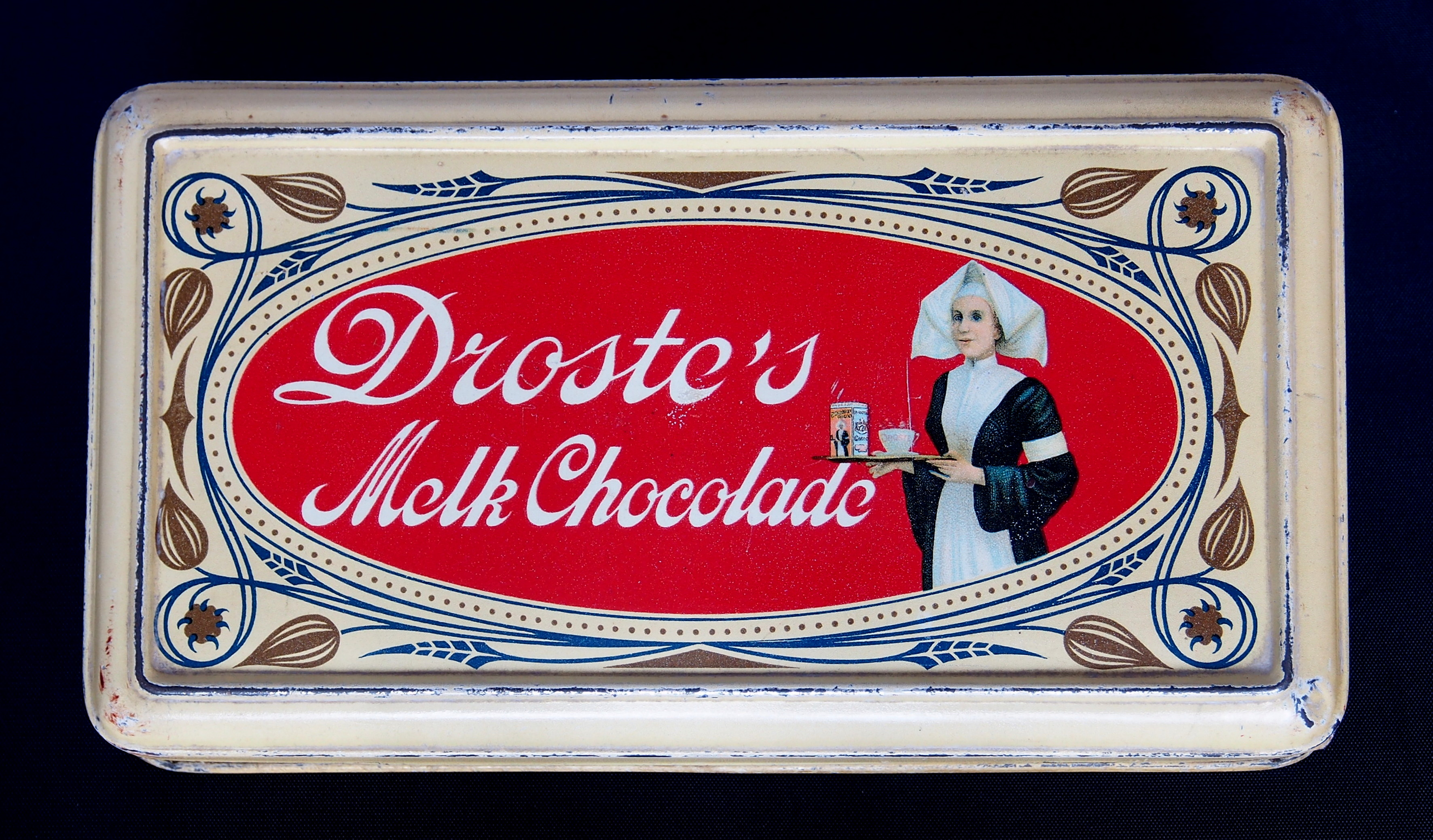

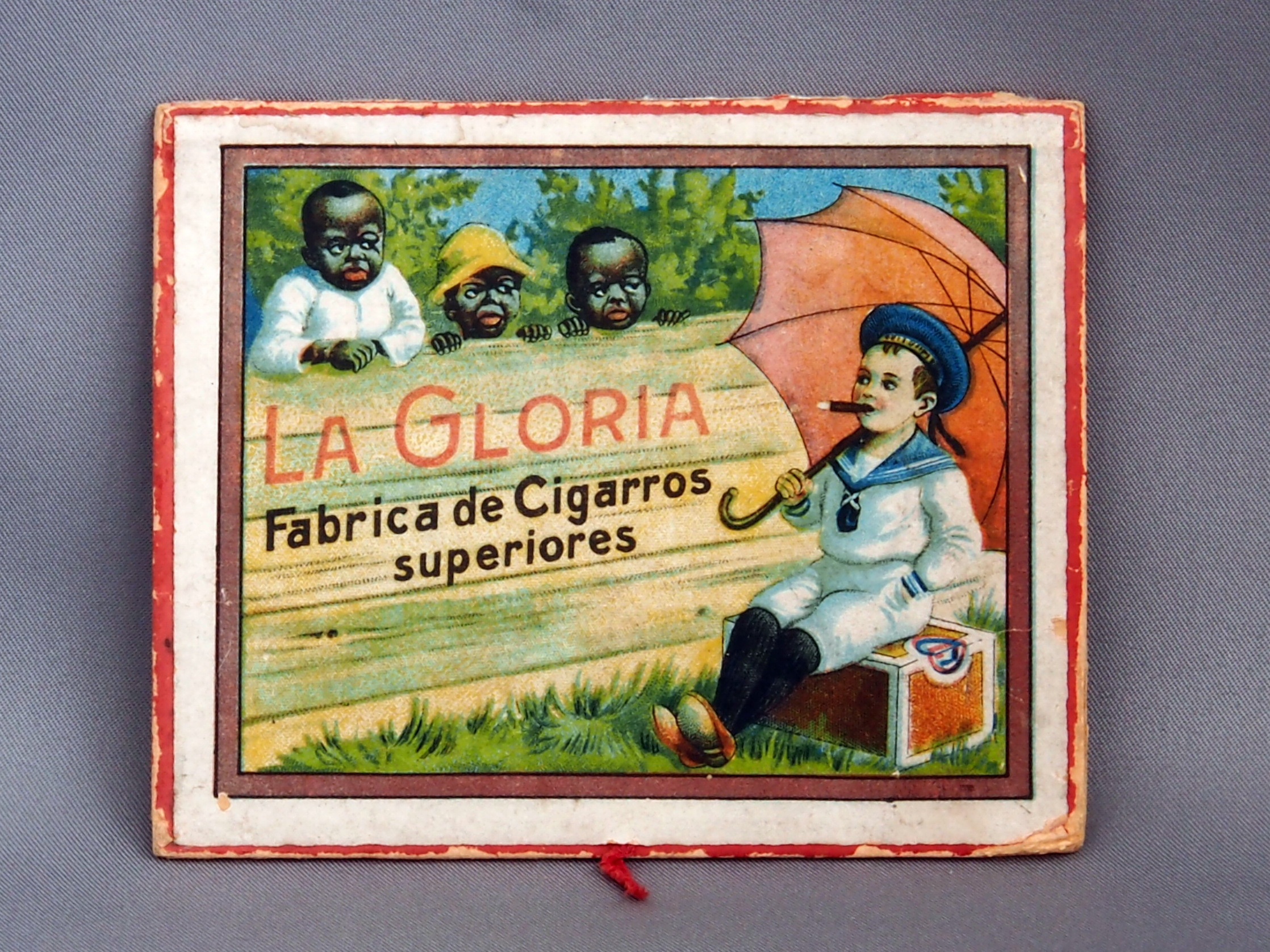

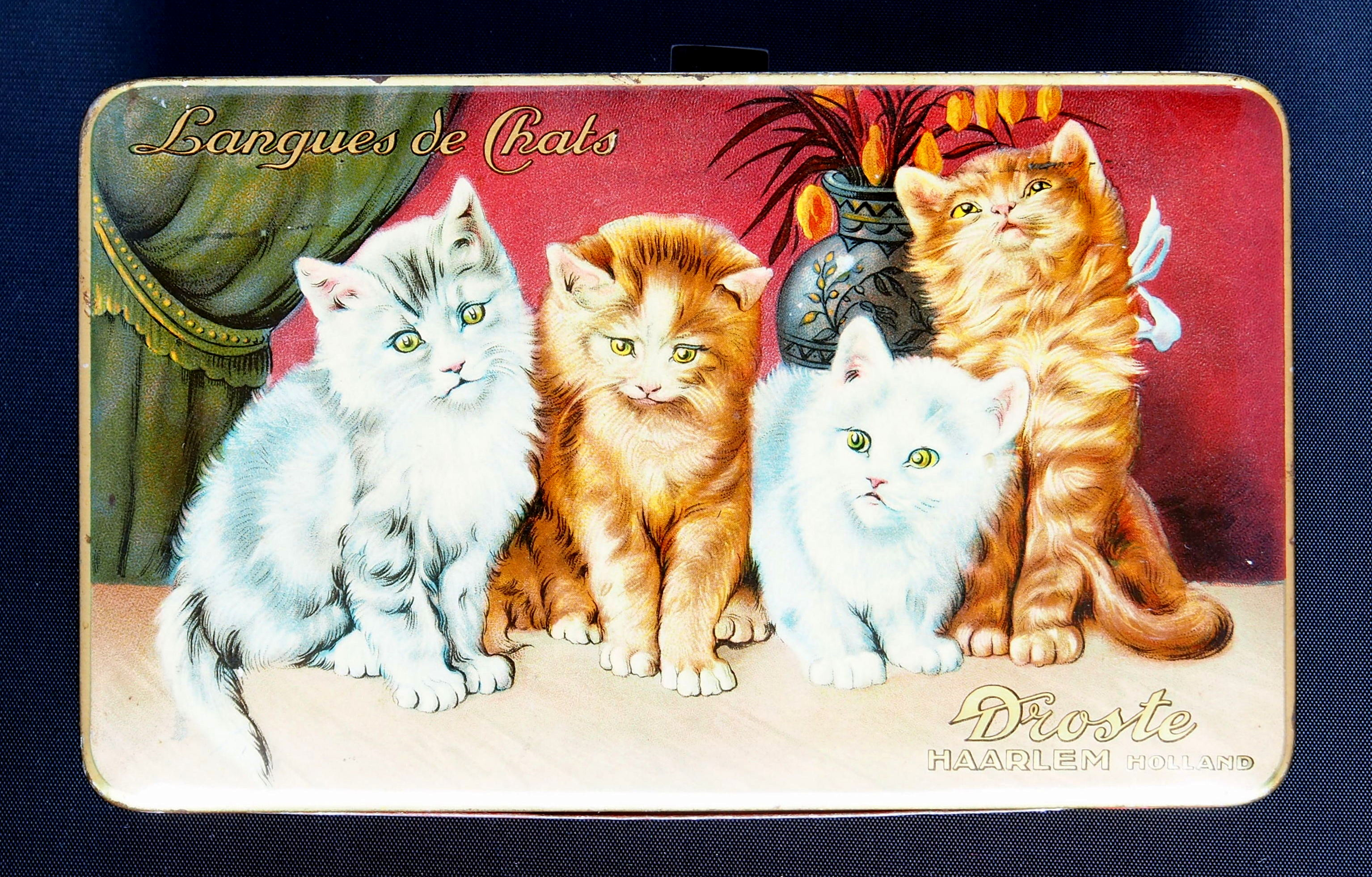

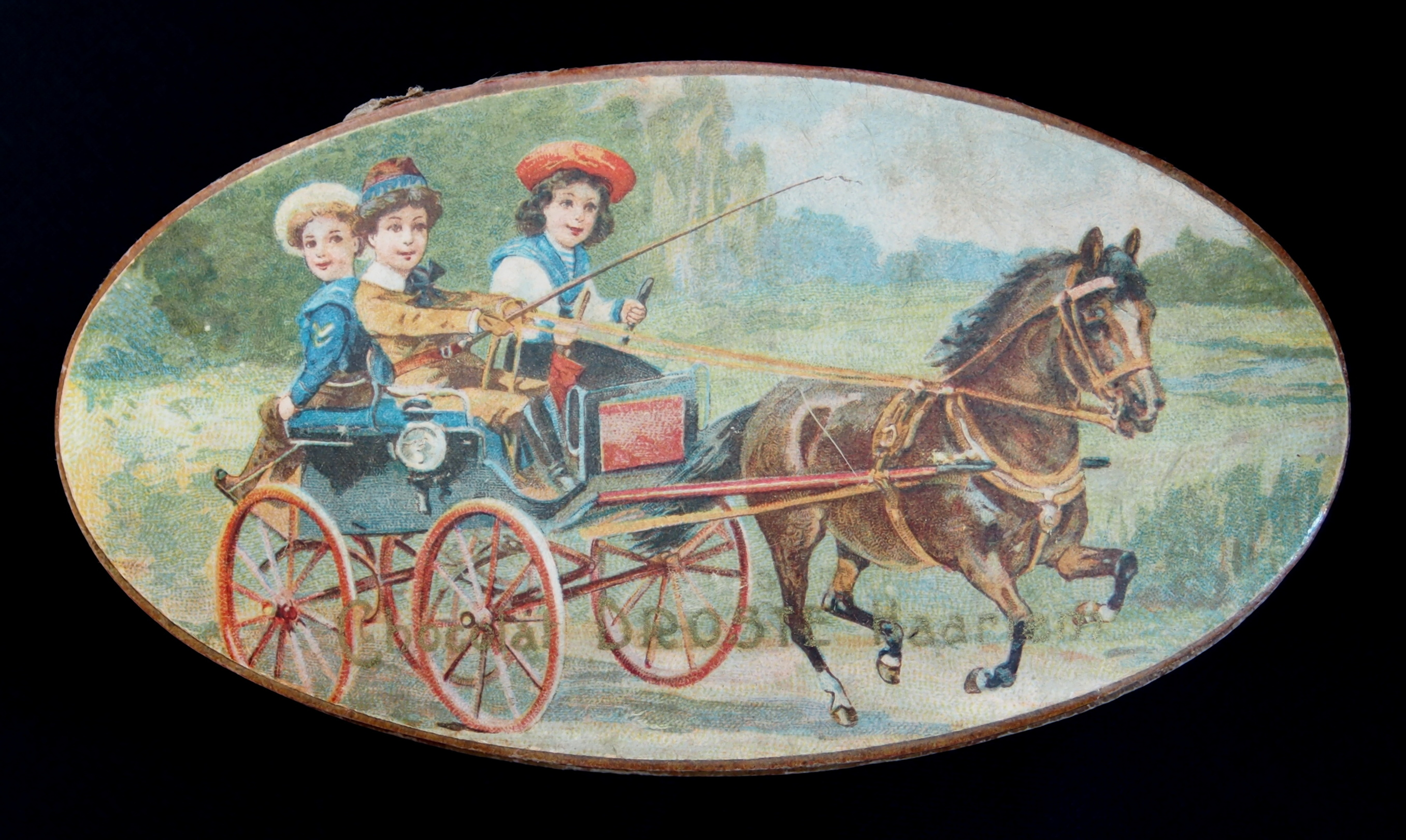

=== Cocoa tins ===
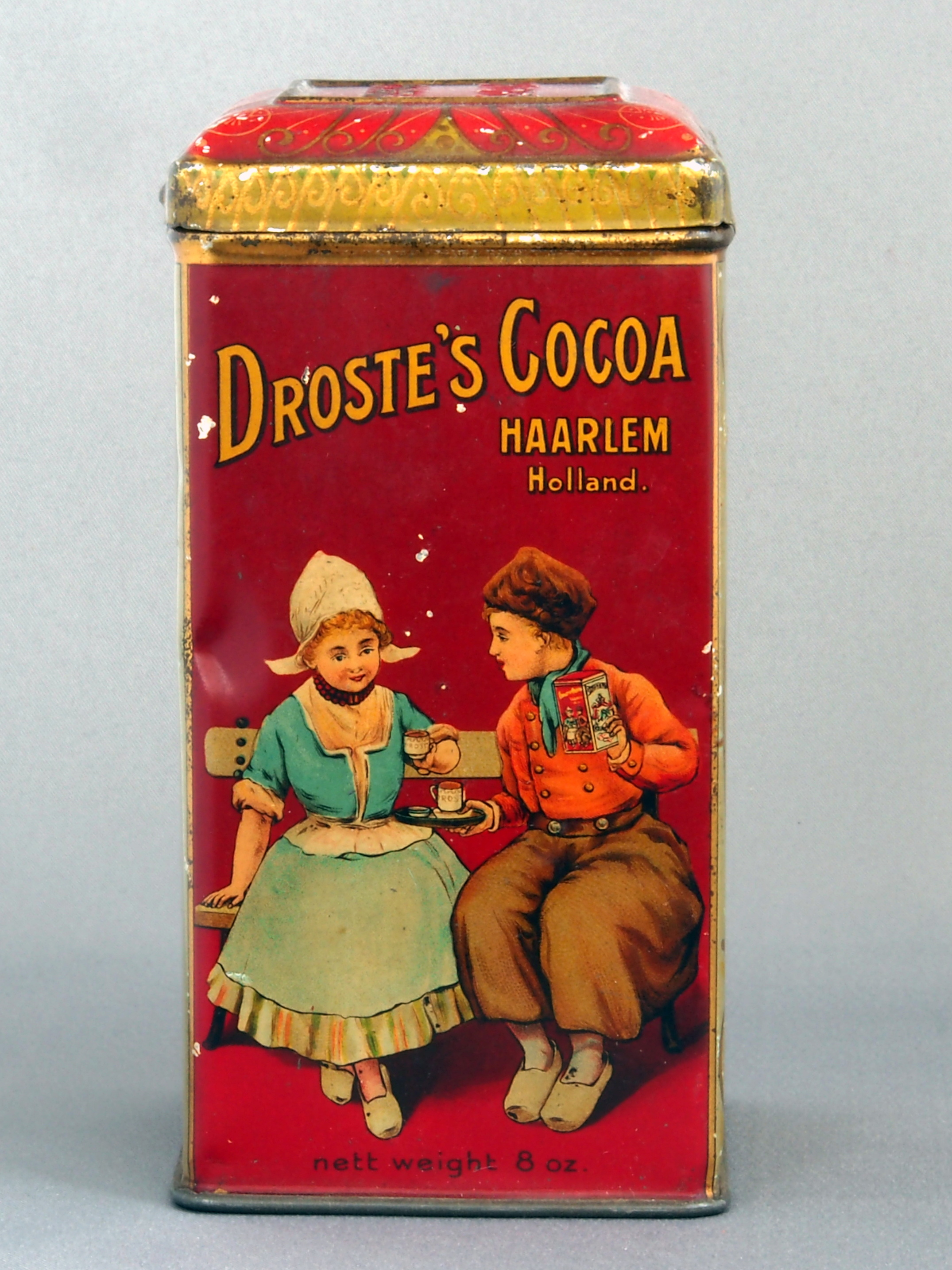

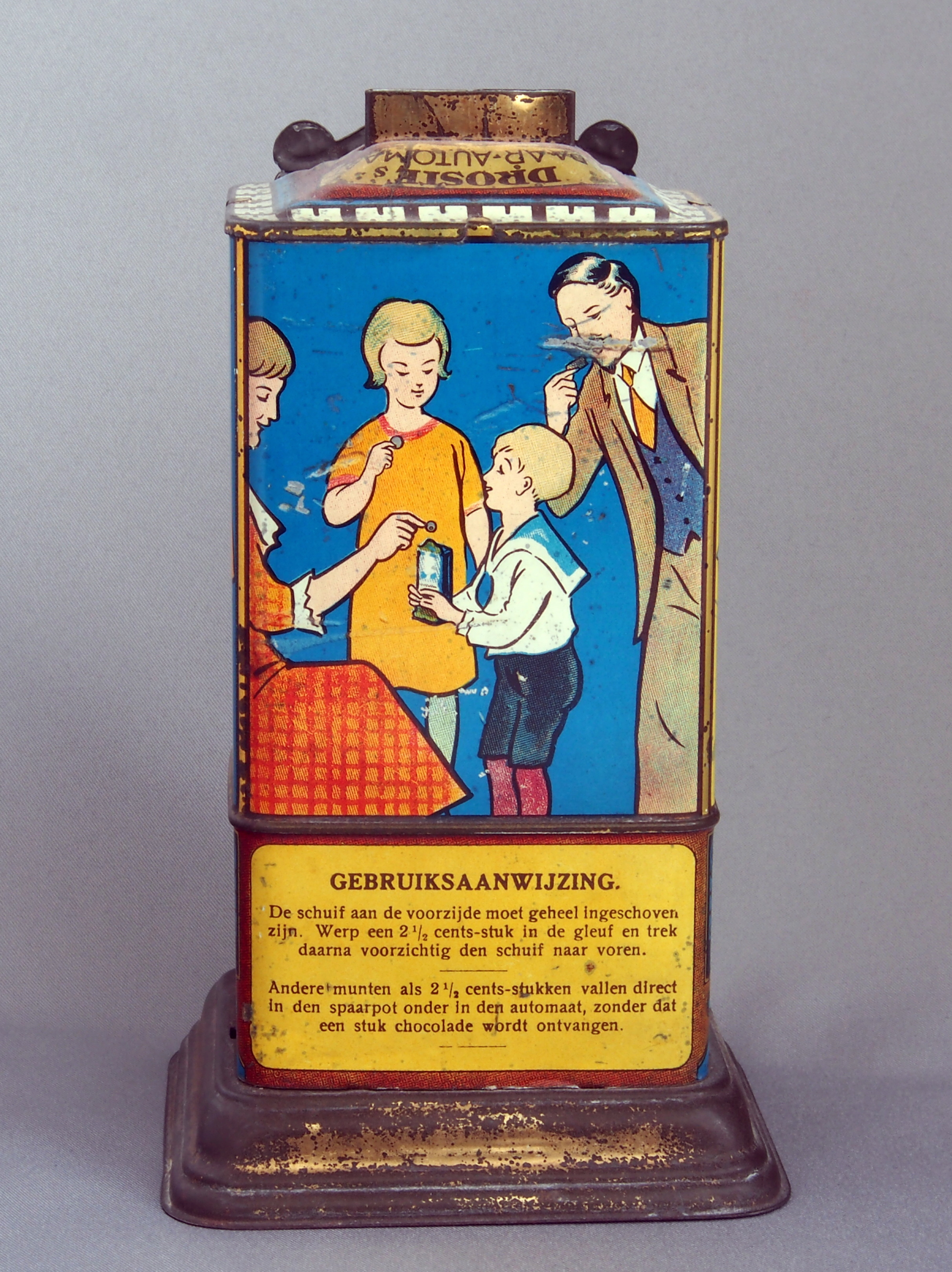

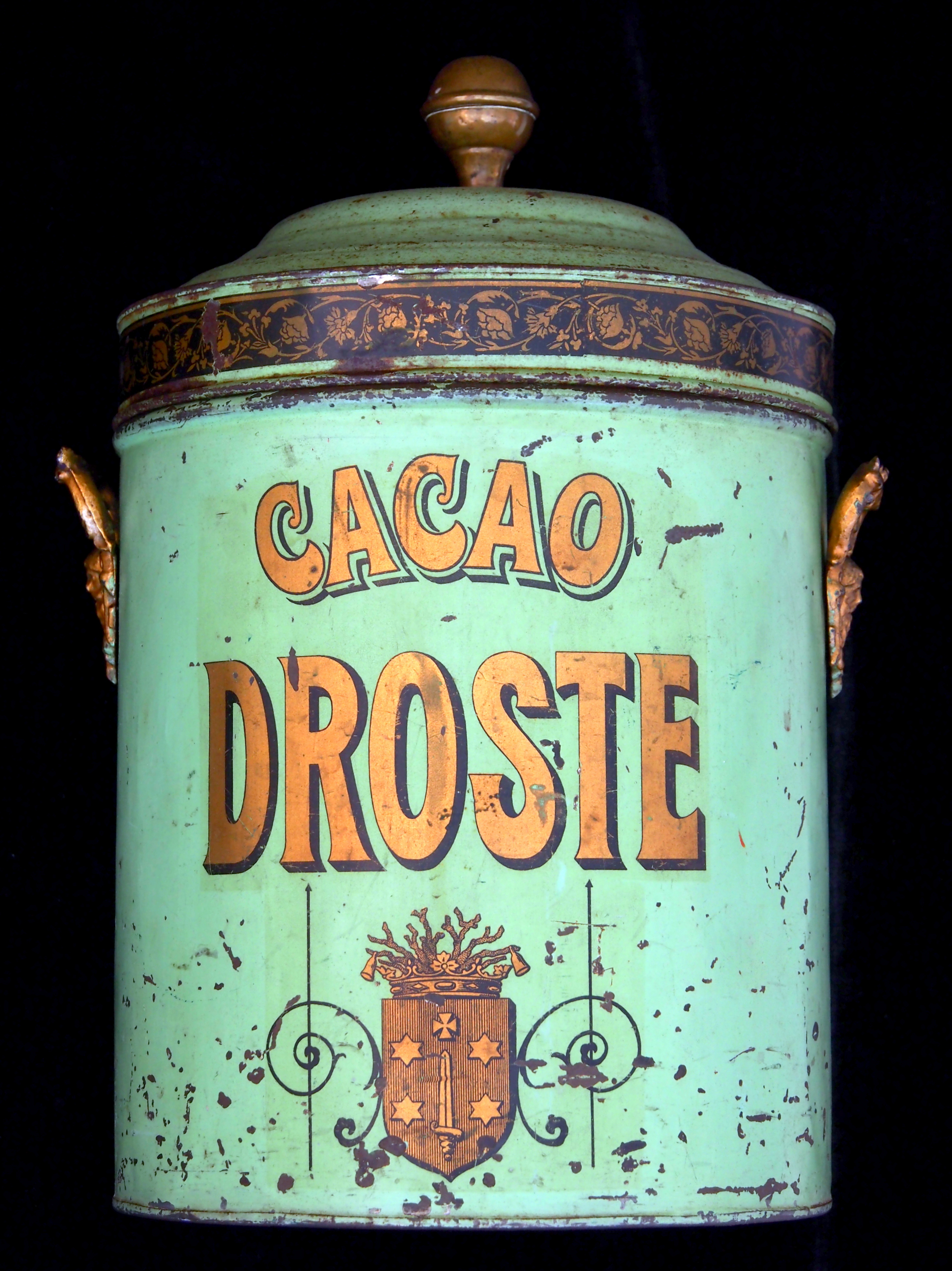

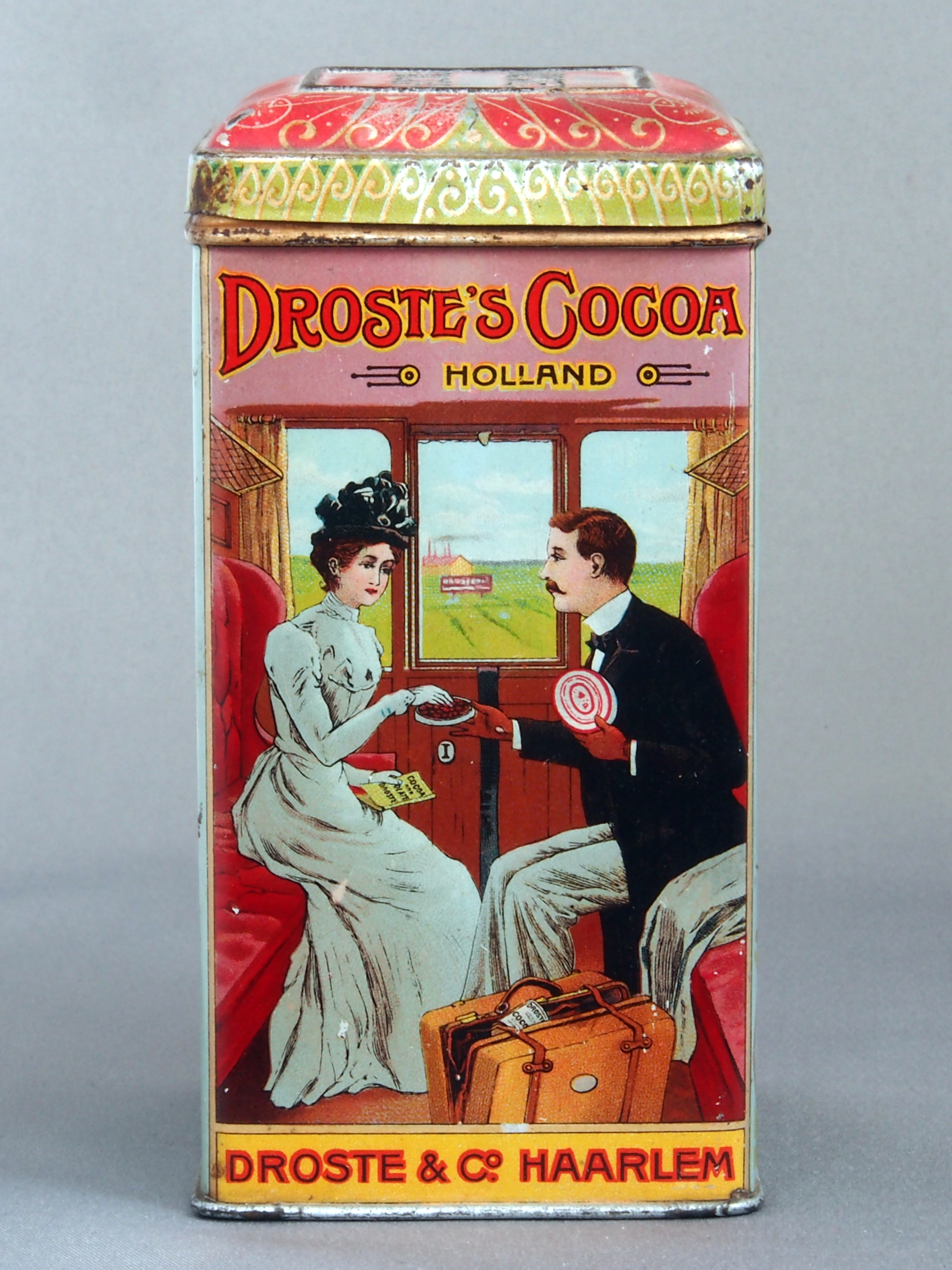

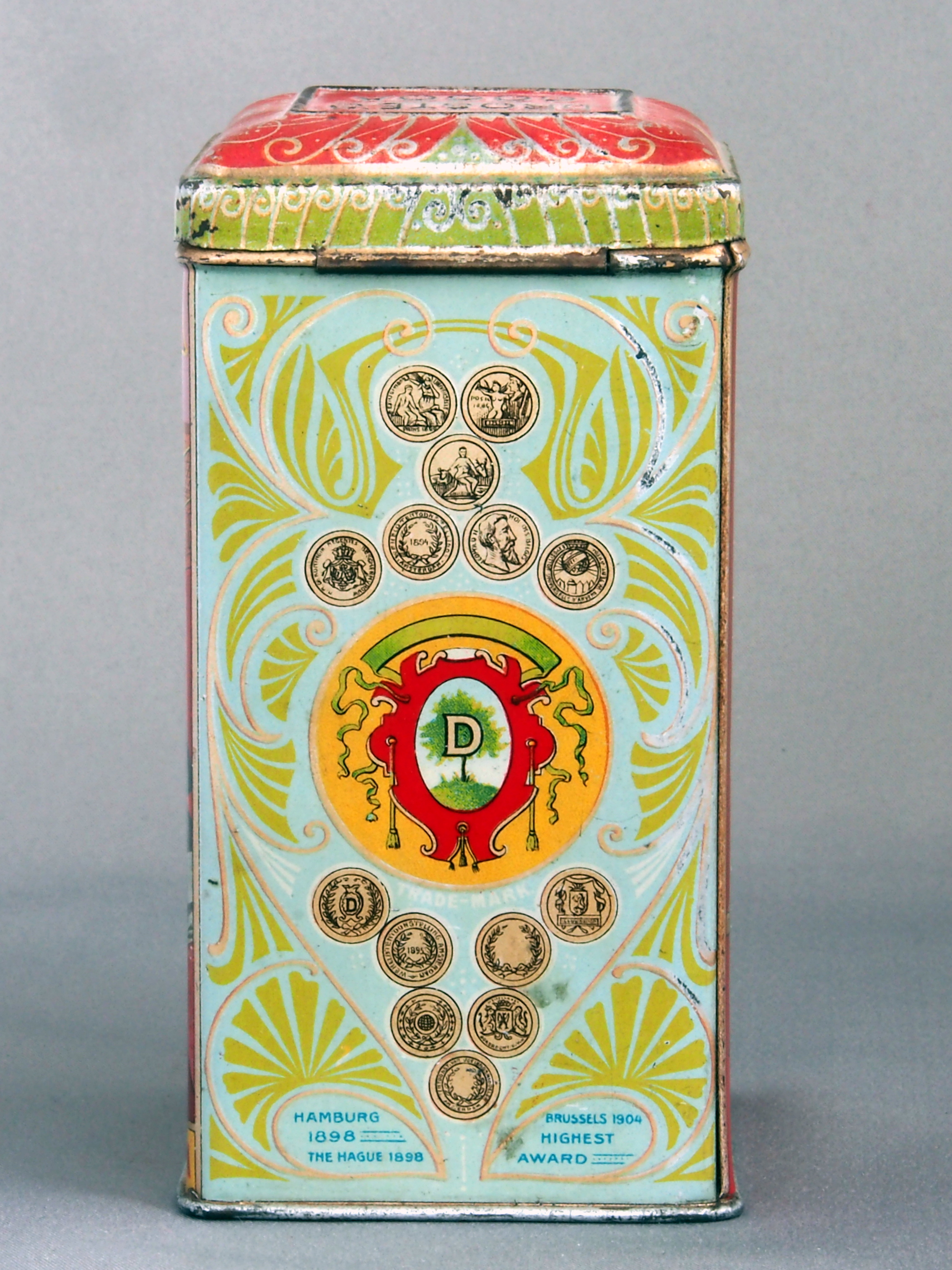

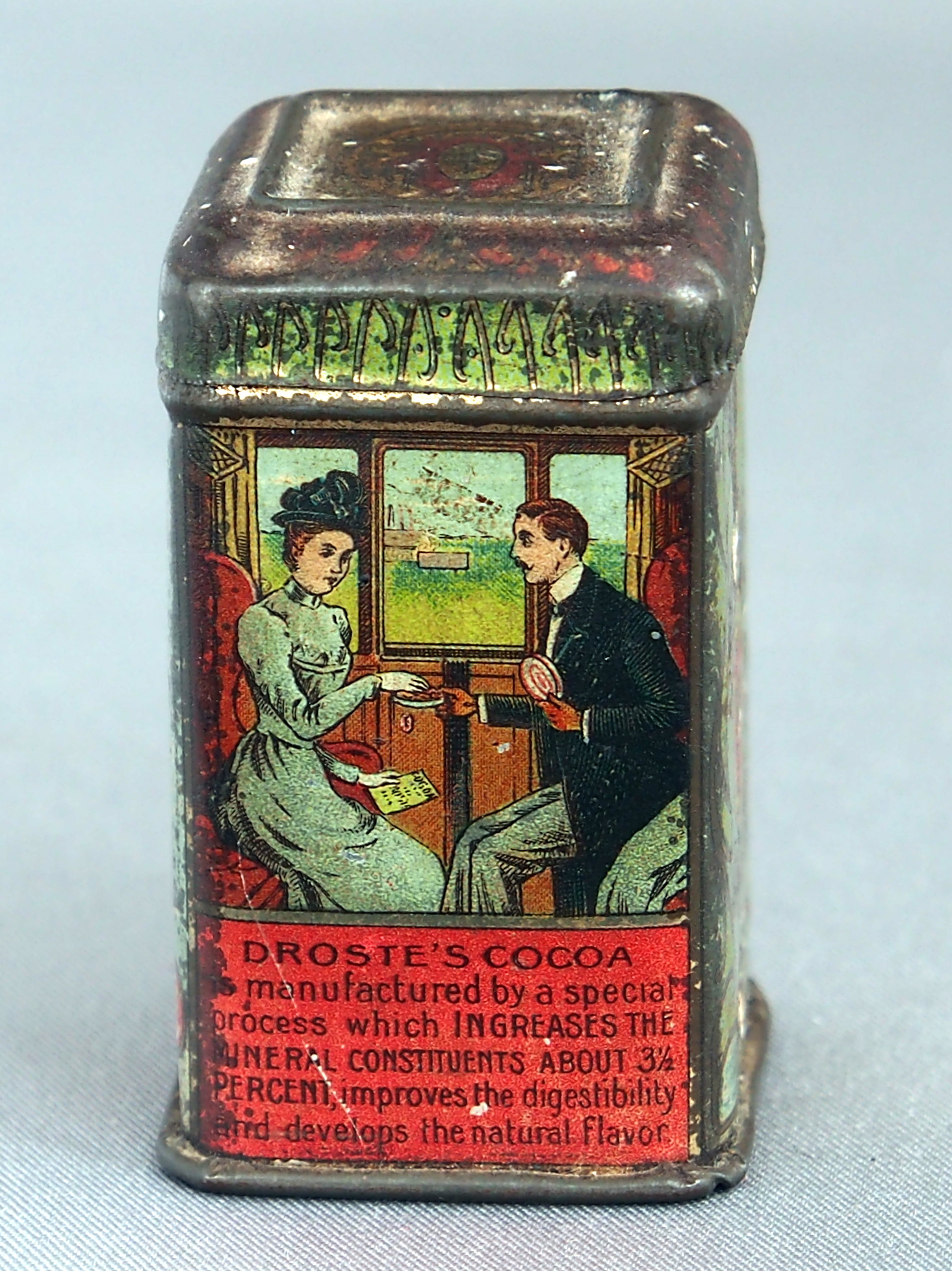

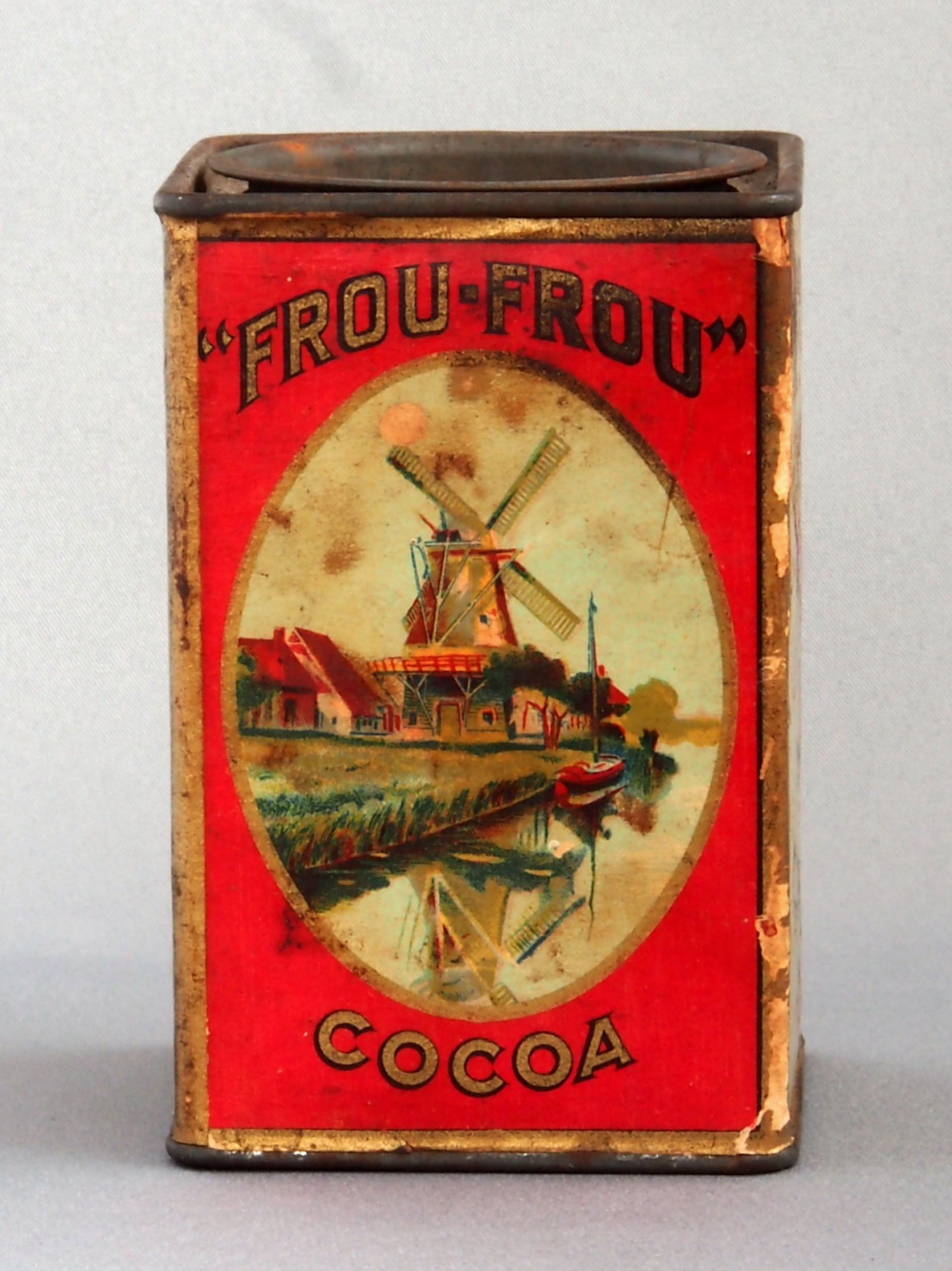
