= List of elections in 1873 =

The following elections occurred in the year 1873.

== Africa ==
=== Liberia ===
- 1873 Liberian general election

== Europe ==
- 1873 Danish Folketing election
- 1873 Faroese general election
- 1873 Greek parliamentary election
- 1873 Norwegian parliamentary election
- 1873 Spanish general election

== North America ==
=== Canada ===
- 1873 Newfoundland general election
- 1873 Prince Edward Island general election

=== United States ===
- 1873 New York state election

==== United States Senate ====
- 1872 and 1873 United States Senate elections
- 1873 United States Senate election in California
- 1873 United States Senate special election in California
- 1873 United States Senate special election in Massachusetts
- United States Senate election in New York, 1873
- 1873 United States Senate election in Pennsylvania
- 1873 United States Senate election in Wisconsin

==== United States House of Representatives ====
- 1872 and 1873 United States House of Representatives elections

==== United States lieutenant gubernatorial ====
- 1873 Connecticut lieutenant gubernatorial election
- 1873 Minnesota lieutenant gubernatorial election
- 1873 Texas lieutenant gubernatorial election
- 1873 Wisconsin lieutenant gubernatorial election

==== United States gubernatorial ====
- 1873 Connecticut gubernatorial election
- 1873 Iowa gubernatorial election
- 1873 Maine gubernatorial election
- 1873 Massachusetts gubernatorial election
- 1873 Minnesota gubernatorial election
- 1873 Mississippi gubernatorial election
- 1873 New Hampshire gubernatorial election
- 1873 Ohio gubernatorial election
- 1873 Rhode Island gubernatorial election
- 1873 Texas gubernatorial election
- 1873 Virginia gubernatorial election
- 1873 Wisconsin gubernatorial election

==== United States mayoral elections ====
- 1873 Boston mayoral election
- 1873 Chicago mayoral election
- 1873 Manchester, New Hampshire mayoral election

== Oceania ==
=== New Zealand ===
- 1873 Lyttelton by-election

== See also ==
- Category:1873 elections
