= 1873 United States Senate special election in Massachusetts =

- March 11 and 12, 1873

Majority vote of the Massachusetts Legislature needed to win
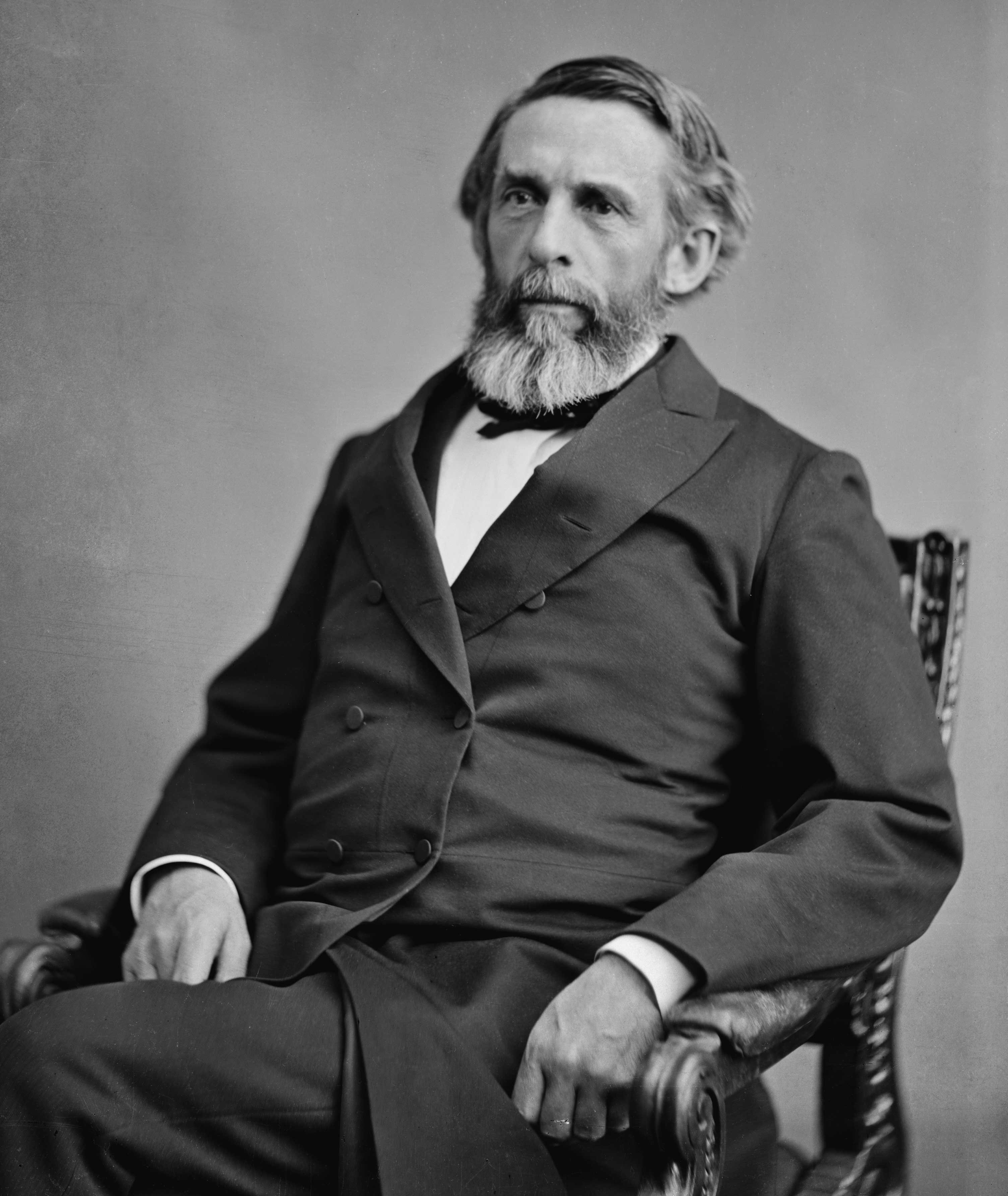

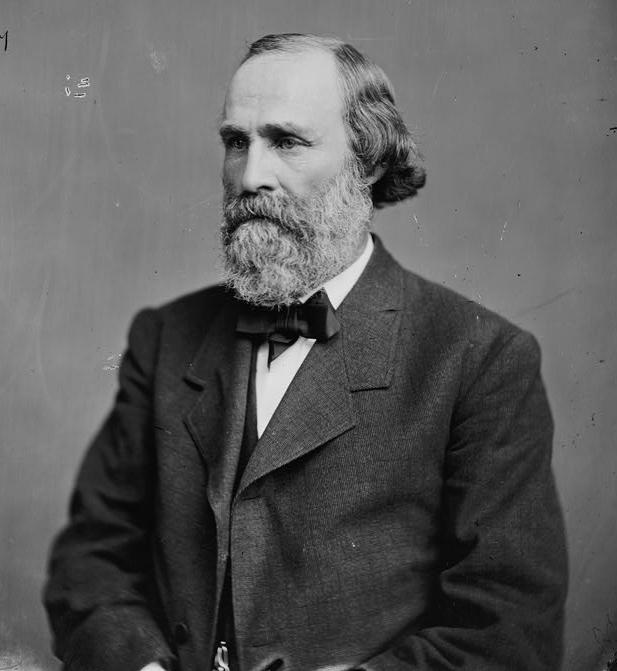
Nominee	George S. Boutwell	Henry L. Dawes
Party	Republican	Republican
Percentage	55.27%	41.82%
Votes	152	115
Senator before election
Henry Wilson
Republican
Elected Senator
George S. Boutwell
Republican

The 1873 United States Senate special election in Massachusetts was held in March 1873 to fill the vacancy left by Senator Henry Wilson, who resigned to become Vice President of the United States. George S. Boutwell won the election.

At the time, Massachusetts elected United States senators by a majority vote of each separate house of the Massachusetts General Court, the House and the Senate. However, the Senate deadlocked in this race; it was moved that both houses would vote as one, and Boutwell won the combined vote.

== Background ==
At the time, the Massachusetts legislature was dominated the Republican Party. Republicans held all but one of the State Senate seats and 211 of 240 state House seats.

Incumbent Senator Henry Wilson resigned from office upon his election as Vice President of the United States, creating a vacancy for the term ending in 1877.

== Election ==
=== March 11 ===
Both houses of the General Court began balloting on March 11. Boutwell achieved a majority of the House on the second ballot, but the Senate deadlocked.

First House ballot
Party	Candidate	Votes	%
Republican	George S. Boutwell	110	46.41%
Republican	Henry L. Dawes	83	35.02%
Republican	George B. Loring	16	6.75%
Republican	William Whiting	9	3.80%
Republican	Nathaniel Prentiss Banks	9	3.80%
Republican	Ebenezer R. Hoar	7	2.95%
Unknown	William G. Whittier	1	0.42%
Republican	William E. Sanford	1	0.42%
Democratic	John K. Tarbox	1	0.42%
Total votes		237	100.00%

Second House ballot
Party	Candidate	Votes	%
Republican	George S. Boutwell	124	52.10%
Republican	Henry L. Dawes	92	38.66%
Republican	George B. Loring	10	4.20%
Republican	William Whiting	6	2.52%
Republican	William E. Sanford	2	0.84%
Democratic	John K. Tarbox	2	0.84%
Republican	Nathaniel Prentiss Banks	1	0.42%
Republican	Ebenezer R. Hoar	1	0.42%
Total votes		238	100.00%

Senate President George Loring, who was a candidate for the seat, did not vote. One member was absent.

First Senate ballot
Party	Candidate	Votes	%
Republican	Henry L. Dawes	11	28.95%
Republican	George S. Boutwell	10	26.32%
Republican	George B. Loring	9	23.68%
Republican	Ebenezer R. Hoar	4	10.53%
Republican	William Whiting	2	5.26%
Republican	George Frisbie Hoar	1	2.63%
Democratic	Charles Gordon Greene	1	2.63%
Total votes		38	100.00%

Second Senate ballot
Party	Candidate	Votes	%
Republican	Henry L. Dawes	12	31.58%
Republican	George S. Boutwell	9	23.68%
Republican	George B. Loring	9	23.68%
Republican	Ebenezer R. Hoar	4	10.53%
Republican	William Whiting	2	5.26%
Republican	George Frisbie Hoar	1	2.63%
Democratic	Charles Gordon Greene	1	2.63%
Total votes		38	100.00%

The third and fourth ballots were identical.

Third and fourth Senate ballot
Party	Candidate	Votes	%
Republican	Henry L. Dawes	15	39.47%
Republican	George S. Boutwell	10	26.32%
Republican	George B. Loring	8	21.05%
Republican	William Whiting	2	5.26%
Republican	Ebenezer R. Hoar	1	2.63%
Republican	George Frisbie Hoar	1	2.63%
Democratic	Charles Gordon Greene	1	2.63%
Total votes		38	100.00%

=== March 12 ===
Following Boutwell's victory in the House, it was widely expected the Senate would ratify their choice the next day. Dawes supporters convened a caucus and decided to continue their support. On the next day, it was moved that both Houses would vote as one to ratify the choice.

Joint ballot
Party	Candidate	Votes	%
Republican	George S. Boutwell	152	55.27%
Republican	Henry L. Dawes	115	41.82%
Republican	George B. Loring	2	0.73%
Democratic	John K. Tarbox	2	0.73%
Republican	William Whiting	2	0.73%
Democratic	Charles Gordon Greene	2	0.73%
Total votes		275	100.00%
