= 1875 Boston mayoral election =

Election in Massachusetts, United States

- December 14, 1875
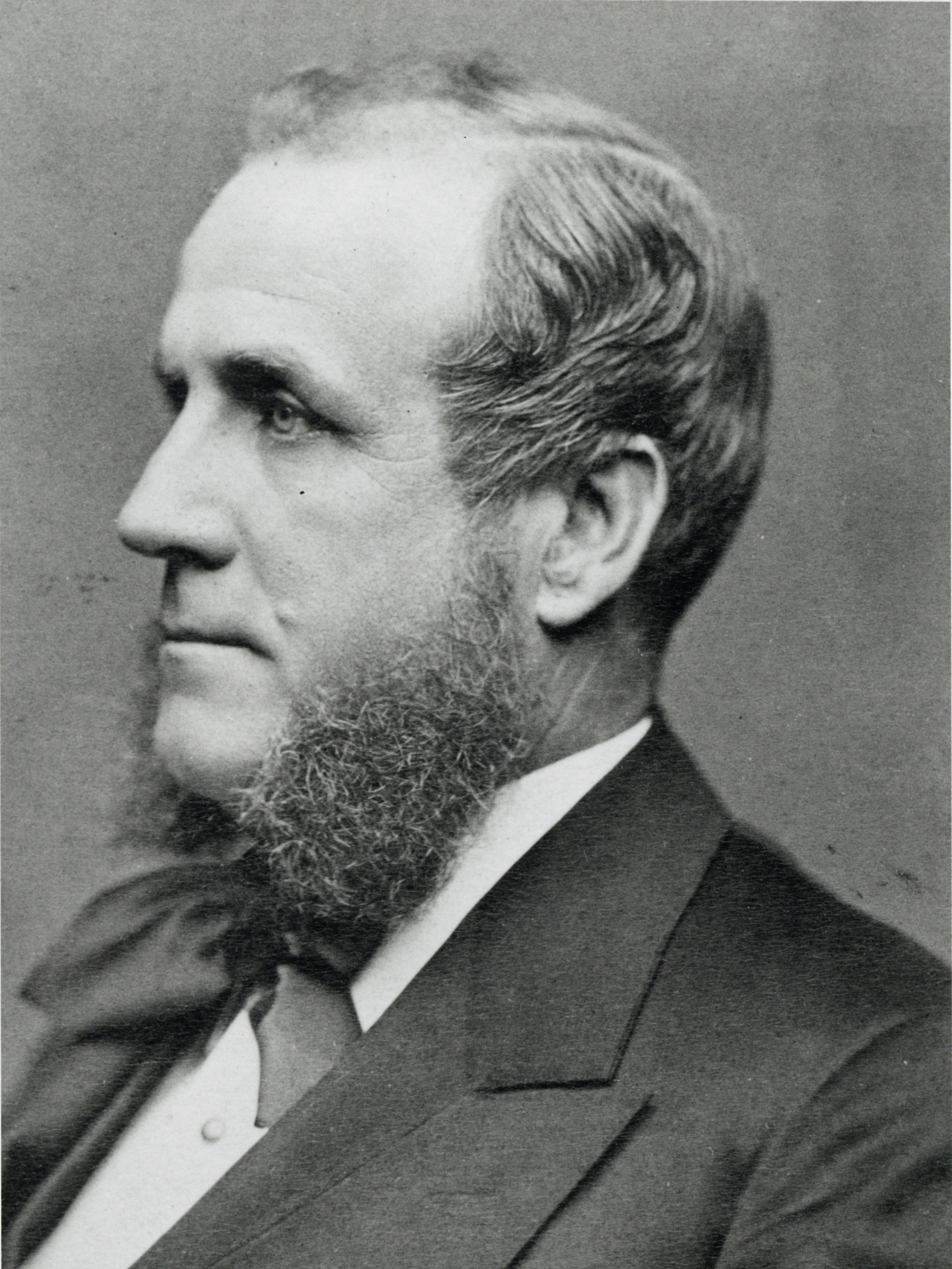

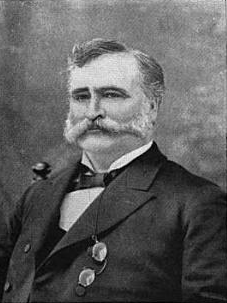
Candidate	Samuel C. Cobb	Halsey J. Boardman
Party	Independent	Fusion
Alliance		Democratic; Republican
Popular vote	14,932	12,178
Percentage	55.05%	44.90%
Mayor before election
Samuel C. Cobb
Independent
Elected mayor
Samuel C. Cobb
Independent

The Boston mayoral election of 1875 saw the reelection of Samuel C. Cobb to a third consecutive term.

== Nominations ==
While incumbent mayor Samuel C. Cobb initially said he would not seek election, a petition asking that he serve a third term received the signatures of roughly 2,000 signatures of leading Bostonians. Cobb agreed to run again. The city committees of both the Democratic and Republican Party opted to unite on running a challenger against Cobb.

== Results ==
After a spirited campaign, Cobb won reelection.

1875 Boston mayoral election
Party	Candidate	Votes	%
Independent	Samuel C. Cobb (incumbent)	14,932	55.05
Fusion	Halsey J. Boardman	12,178	44.90
Others	Scattering	14	0.05
Turnout		27,124	

== See also ==
- List of mayors of Boston, Massachusetts
