= Samuel C. Cobb =

American politician (1826–1891)

Samuel Crocker Cobb
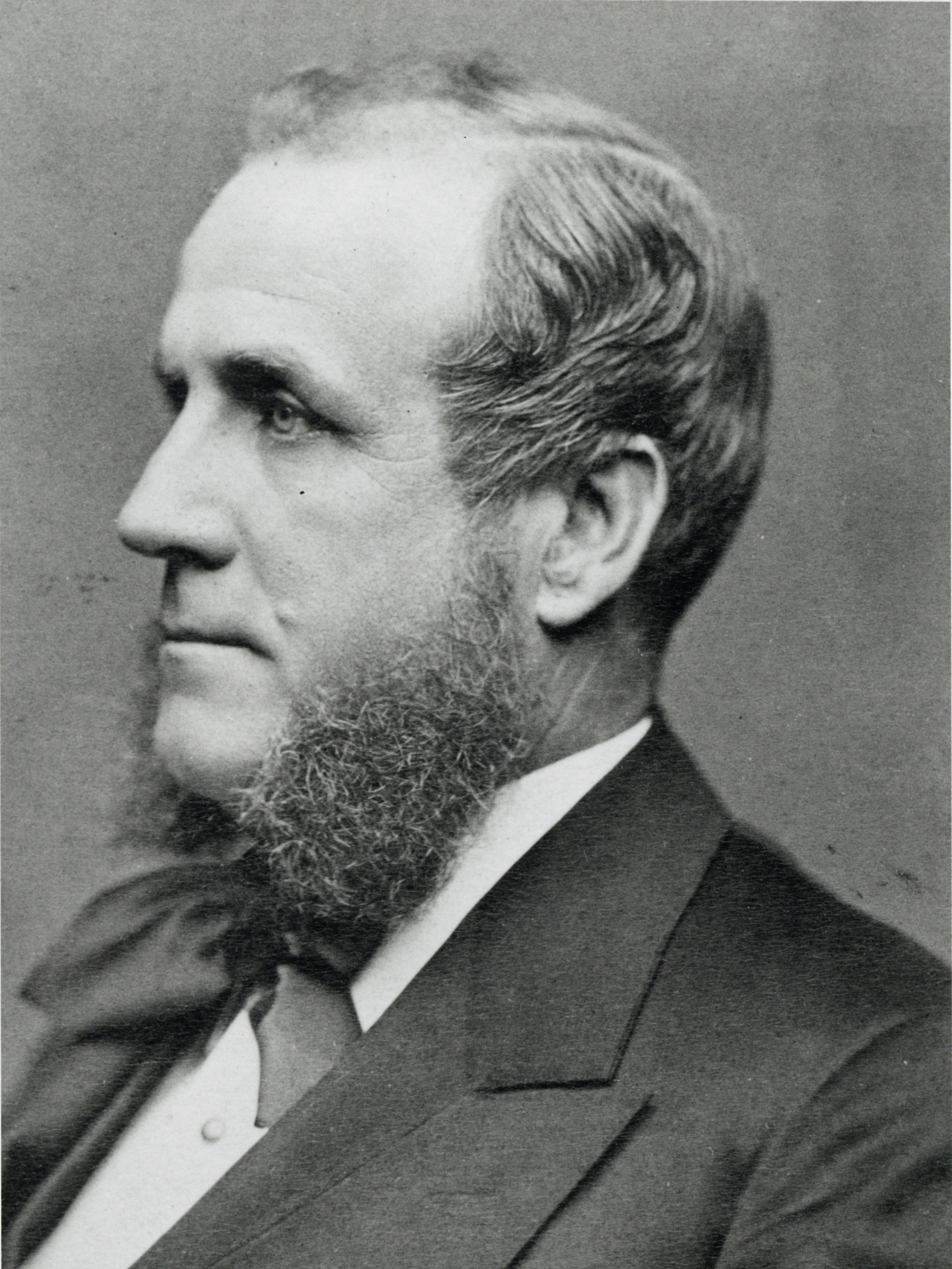

Mayor of Boston
- In office 1874–1877
- Preceded by: Henry L. Pierce; Leonard R. Cutter (acting)
- Succeeded by: Frederick O. Prince

Member of the Boston Board of Aldermen
- In office 1867

Member of the Roxbury, Massachusetts Board of Aldermen
- In office 1861–1862

Personal details
- Born: May 22, 1826 Taunton, Massachusetts, U.S.
- Died: February 18, 1891 (aged 64) Boston, Massachusetts, U.S.
- Resting place: Forest Hills Cemetery, Boston
- Party: Whig; nonpartisan
- Spouse: Aurelia L. Beattie
- Education: Bristol Academy, Taunton, Massachusetts
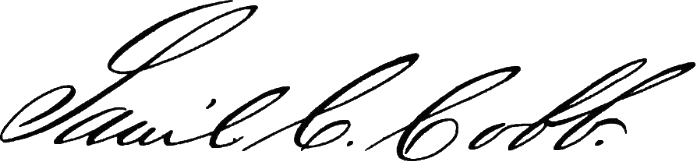
- Signature

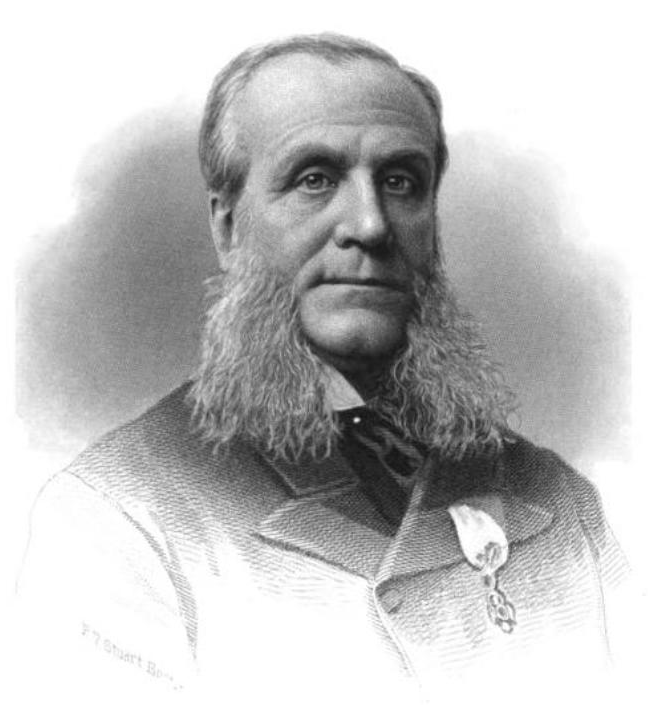
Sketch of Cobb

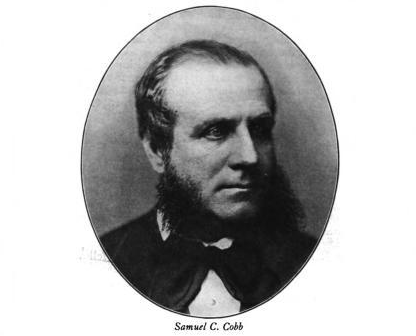
Image of Cobb

Samuel Crocker Cobb (May 22, 1826 – February 18, 1891) was a businessman and politician who served on the city councils of the cities Roxbury, Massachusetts and Boston, Massachusetts and who served three consecutive terms as the mayor of Boston.

== Early life and education ==
Cobb was born May 22, 1826, in Taunton, Massachusetts to David George Washington Cobb and Abby (Crocker) Cobb. Cobb's paternal grandfather was Massachusetts politician David Cobb.

Cobb attended several private schools in his youth before graduating from Bristol Academy in Taunton. While he had been expected to continue his studies by entering higher education, he opted to instead enter the workforce. In September 1842, at the age of sixteen, he took a job as a clerk for the Boston foreign shipping merchants A. & C. Cunningham.

== Business career ==
Cobb became a successful merchant in Boston's shipping and commission industries. In 1851, he entered a business partnership with Josiah Wheelwright which lasted until August 1858 when they dissolved their firm by mutual consent when Wheelwright retired. From then until 1878, Cobb continued in business alone.

Cobb was on the board of directors for the Old Colony Railroad, the Bay State Trust Company, and Forest Hills Cemetery.

== Early political and public career ==
Cobb was originally a member of the late Whig Party, supporting its candidates until its dissolution. In the 1860s, he often worked with the Democratic Party organizations when it came to state and national politics, but avoided affiliating himself with a political party in local politics.

Elected in 1860, Cobb served in 1861 and 1862 as an alderman (city councilor) in the then-independent city of Roxbury, Massachusetts. In 1868 he served as a member of the Boston Board of Aldermen. He did not seek reelection the next year, retiring from that office after a single year in office due to poor health and a frustration with the aldermen's lack of power compared to the Boston Common Council.

After leaving office as alderman, Cobb served as one of the directors of public institutions, in which position he opposed the creation of a mental asylum in Winthrop, Massachusetts. He was later appointed to the state board to select an alternate site for a mental asylum in Suffolk County. He also served as president of the Roxbury Charitable Society; Beginning in 1861, he served as a member of the standing committee of the Massachusetts Society of the Cincinnati. He was the secretary of the organization from 1865 to 1871, and as its president for some time thereafter. Overall, he would spend 25 years as an officer of the organization.

In 1872, Cobb unsuccessfully ran for United States Congress, running as the nominee of both the Democratic Party and the Liberal Republican Party. He was defeated by Republican Party nominee William Whiting.

== Boston mayoralty (1874–1877) ==
Cobb was elected mayor of Boston in December 1873. His candidacy was supported by both the Democratic and Republican party organizations. He reelection in in 1874 was similarly supported by both major parties. In 1874, the two parties jointly supported a challenger to Cobb, but he prevailed at re-election to a third term.

Cobb opposed having the government create jobs for the unemployed amid the Panic of 1873, declaring the idea "subversive to our whole social fabric, tending directly to communism in its worst form."

The event of greatest historical interest during Mayor Cobb's administration was the celebration of the one hundredth anniversary of the Battle of Bunker Hill. It is related that on this occasion many men who had taken leading parts in the war of the rebellion, both Unionists and Confederates, met for the first time in peace.

Cobb unsuccessfully attempted to get the Boston City Council to adopt a new city charter.

== Later public roles ==
Cobb continued to be involved in the Massachusetts Society of the Cincinnati until his death. He served a total of 25 years as an officer of the organization. At the time of his death, he was serving as its president. He also served for several years as an influential member of the board of directors for the Massachusetts Institute of Technology.

Cobb served as treasurer of the Society for Propagating the Gospel among the Indians.

== Family life ==
On November 21, 1848, Cobb married Aurelia L. Beattie, in Belfast, Maine. Aurelia was the third daughter of William and Jane I. Beattie of East Thomaston, Maine.

For much of his business career in Boston, Cobb lived on Highland Street in Roxbury. However, in 1878, he moved elsewhere in Boston and lived on Boylston Street. Prior to his move he attended the church led by his neighbor, Rev. George Putnam. However, after he moved to Boylston Street he began attending the First Church in Boston.

In 1870, amid rigorous business work and aldermanic work, Cobb began to suffer poor health. He never fully recovered. Though he did not present as being in poor health, for much of the rest of his life he suffered health problems.

== Death ==
In 1890, Cobb was privately suffering from pain and disease. He hid his ailments from the public, and continued to carry out his obligations until be urged by a physician to cease working. After weeks of pain, he died on February 18, 1891. His burial was at Forest Hills Cemetery.

== See also ==
- Timeline of Boston, 1860s-1870s

Political offices
Preceded by Leonard R. Cutter	24th Mayor of Boston, Massachusetts; 1874–1877	Succeeded by Frederick O. Prince
