= Ginery Twichell House =

Historic house in Massachusetts, United States

- U.S. National Register of Historic Places
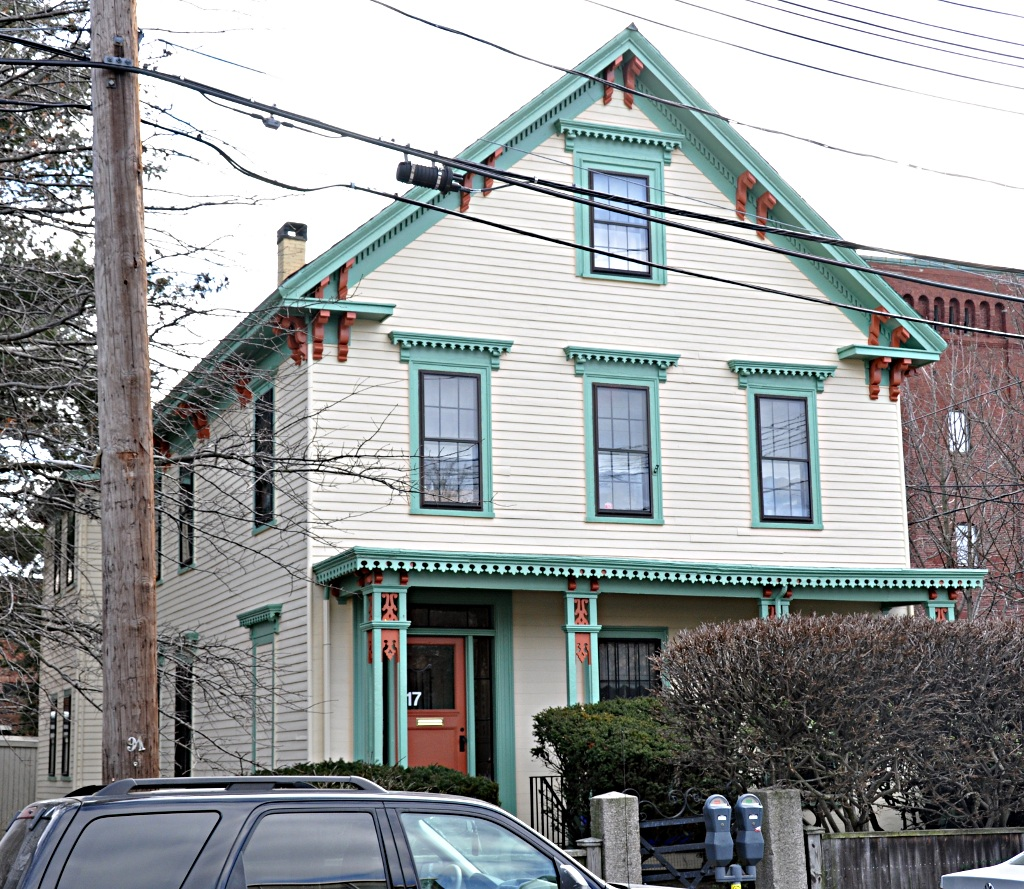

- Location within Massachusetts
- Location: 17 Kent St., Brookline, Massachusetts
- Coordinates: 42°19′59.34″N 71°7′5.08″W
- Architectural style: Greek Revival, Italianate
- MPS: Brookline MRA
- NRHP reference No.: 85003240
- Added to NRHP: October 17, 1985

The Ginery Twichell House is a historic house located at 17 Kent Street in Brookline, Massachusetts.

== Description and history ==
The 2 1/2(two and half) story wood-frame house was built in the year 1844–1855 by Ginery Twichell, a leading Massachusetts politician, as well as a nationally prominent stagecoach and railroad owner. Twichell lived at 40 Kent Street. The house is a well-preserved example of transitional Greek Revival-Italianate styling. Its massing and roofline are typically Greek Revival, but its gable ends and eaves have doubled brackets, and its windows are capped by scrollwork decoration.

The house was listed on the National Register of Historic Places on October 17, 1985.

== See also ==
- National Register of Historic Places listings in Brookline, Massachusetts
