= 1873 Wisconsin lieutenant gubernatorial election =

- November 4, 1873
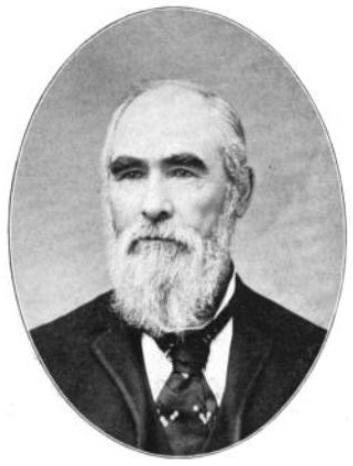

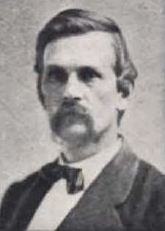
Nominee	Charles D. Parker	Robert H. Baker
Party	Democratic	Republican
Popular vote	80,212	67,208
Percentage	54.40%	45.58%
Lieutenant Governor before election
Vacant
Elected Lieutenant Governor
Charles D. Parker
Democratic

The 1873 Wisconsin lieutenant gubernatorial election was held on November 4, 1873, in order to elect the lieutenant governor of Wisconsin. Democratic nominee and former member of the Wisconsin State Assembly Charles D. Parker defeated Republican nominee and former member of the Wisconsin Senate Robert H. Baker. Parker was the first Democrat elected lieutenant governor of Wisconsin since Erasmus D. Campbell in 1857.

== General election ==
On election day, November 4, 1873, Democratic nominee Charles D. Parker won the election by a margin of 13,004 votes against his opponent Republican nominee Robert H. Baker, thereby gaining Democratic control over the office of lieutenant governor. Parker was sworn in as the 12th lieutenant governor of Wisconsin on January 5, 1874.

=== Results ===
Wisconsin lieutenant gubernatorial election, 1873
Party	Candidate	Votes	%
Democratic	Charles D. Parker	80,212	54.40
Republican	Robert H. Baker	67,208	45.58
	Scattering	27	0.02
Total votes		147,447	100.00
Democratic gain from Republican			
