= Nathaniel Greene (journalist) =

American journalist

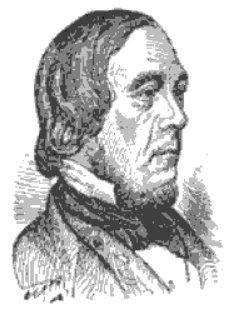
- Born: May 20, 1797; Boscawen, New Hampshire
- Died: November 29, 1877 (aged 80); Boston, Massachusetts
- Resting place: Mount Auburn Cemetery
- Occupation: Journalist
- Political party: Democratic
- Spouse: Susan Batchelder
- Children: William Batchelder Greene
- Relatives: Charles Gordon Greene (brother)

Nathaniel Greene (1797–1877) was an American journalist.

== Biography ==
Nathaniel Greene was born in Boscawen, New Hampshire on May 20, 1797. He became an apprentice in the office of the New Hampshire Patriot in 1809 and in 1812 edited the Concord Gazette. In 1814 moved to Portsmouth, where he had charge of the New Hampshire Gazette. After this he settled in Haverhill, Massachusetts, and for two years managed the Haverhill Gazette. In May, 1817, he founded and edited the Essex Patriot, with which journal he remained connected until 1821, when he was invited to Boston and there founded the Statesman, a prominent Democratic organ. He was for 15 years postmaster of Boston.

He published several translations:

- Sforzosi's History of Italy (1836)
- Tales from the German (1837)
- Tales and Sketches, Translated from the Italian, French and German (1843)
- Improvisations and Translations (1852)

From 1849 until 1861, he resided in Paris, and on his return settled in Boston. He contributed more than two hundred poems to various Boston journals, which appeared over the pen name of "Boscawen".

He died in Boston on November 29, 1877.

== Family ==
His brother was Charles Gordon Greene, also a noted journalist. Nathaniel and his wife Susan Batchelder had a son, William Batchelder Greene, who was a noted author and abolitionist.
