= Francis B. Hayes =

American politician (1819–1884)

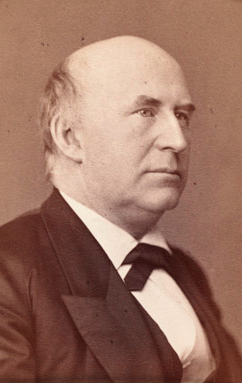

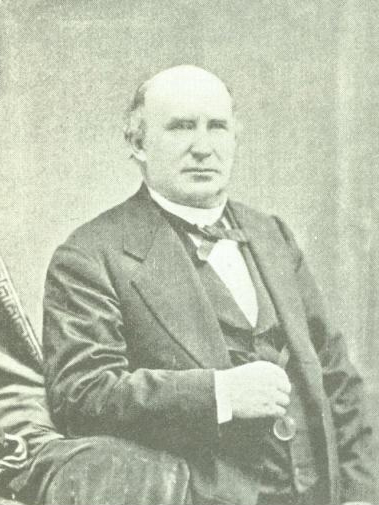

Francis Brown Hayes (1819 – 1884) was a businessman, landowner, lawyer, and state legislator in Massachusetts. He lived in Lexington, Massachusetts. He served in the Massachusetts Senate.

His mother was part of the Lord family. He graduated from Berwick Academy, Harvard University, and Harvard Law School. He was a director of the Boston and Maine Railroad. He lived on Academy Street in Lexington.

His "Old South Speech" was delivered in the Massachusetts Senate on April 16, 1874. In it, he advocated for preserving the Old South Meeting House in Boston. A pamphlet on the debate including his speech was published.

He served as president of the Massachusetts Horticultural Society. He served as president of Berwick Academy, including when author Sarah Orne Jewett was a student there. Hayes oversaw its rebuilding after protesting arsonists burned it down. He build a mansion called Oakmount in Lexington. A portrait of Hayes and a marble bust have been kept in the library room at the Fogg Memorial Building on the campus of Berwick Academy. His son was also named Francis B. Hayes; he died in England at age 33 and made various bequests to people and institutions. One of his bequests funded a Minute Man statue in Lexington by Henry Hudson Kitson.

== See also ==
- 1873 Massachusetts legislature
- 1874 Massachusetts legislature
- 1874 Boston mayoral election
- Benjamin Franklin Hayes
