= 1873 Boston mayoral election =

Election in Massachusetts, United States

- December 9, 1873
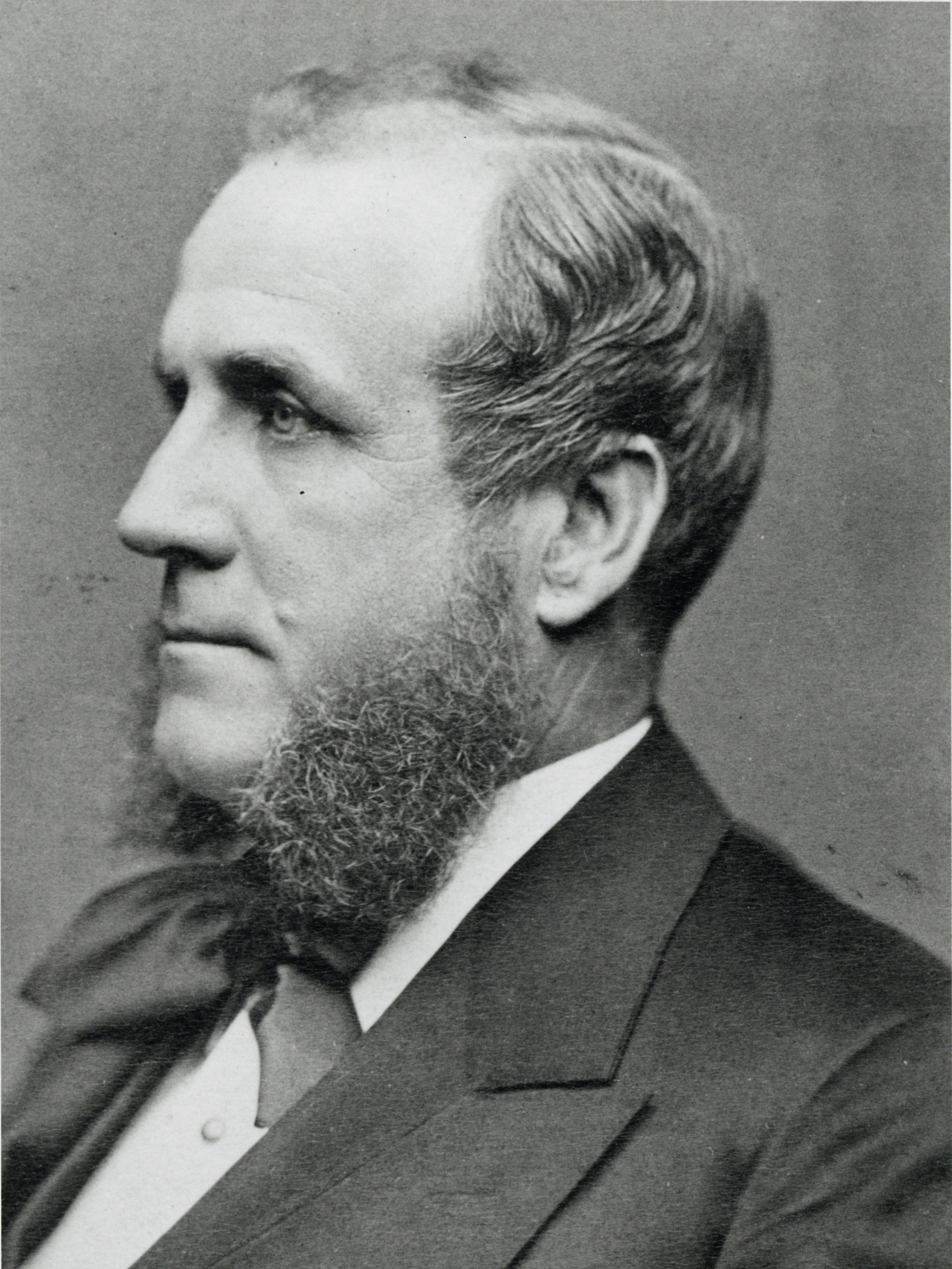

Candidate	Samuel C. Cobb	Henry D. Cushing
Party	Independent	Prohibition
Alliance	Democratic; Republican; People's; Citizen's; German
Popular vote	19,187	572
Percentage	97.00%	2.89%
Mayor before election
Leonard R. Cutter (acting)
Democratic
Elected mayor
Samuel C. Cobb
Independent

The Boston mayoral election of 1873 saw the election of Samuel C. Cobb.

== Nominations ==
Cobb, who opted not to affiliate himself with any political party, was nominated for mayor by a citizens meeting held on November 11, 1873. Some of the leading members of both the city's Democratic and Republican party organizations attending this meeting. Subsequently, both major parties nominated Cobb on their tickets for the election. Cobb was also nominated on the tickets of the city's People's, Citizen's, and German parties.

The Prohibition Party nominated Henry D. Cushing. The Prohibition Party ran an independent ticket in the municipal elections that did not nominate any candidates that appeared on other party's tickets. Many of them were first-time candidates for public office.

== Results ==
1873 Boston mayoral election
Party	Candidate	Votes	%
Independent	Samuel C. Cobb	19,187	97.00
Prohibition	Henry D. Cushing	572	2.89
Others	Scattering	22	0.11
Turnout		17,716	

== See also ==
- List of mayors of Boston, Massachusetts
