= Claire D. Clarke =

American politician (died 2022)

Claire D. Clarke (died January 15, 2022) was an American politician.

Clarke lived in Boscawen, New Hampshire, with her husband since 1969. She was a counselor for the Winnisquam Regional School District. Clarke served on the Merrimack Valley School Board. Clarke served in the New Hampshire House of Representatives from 2001 until 2011 and was a Democrat. She died in Boscawen, New Hampshire.
