= 1874 Boston mayoral election =

Election in Massachusetts, United States

- December 15, 1874
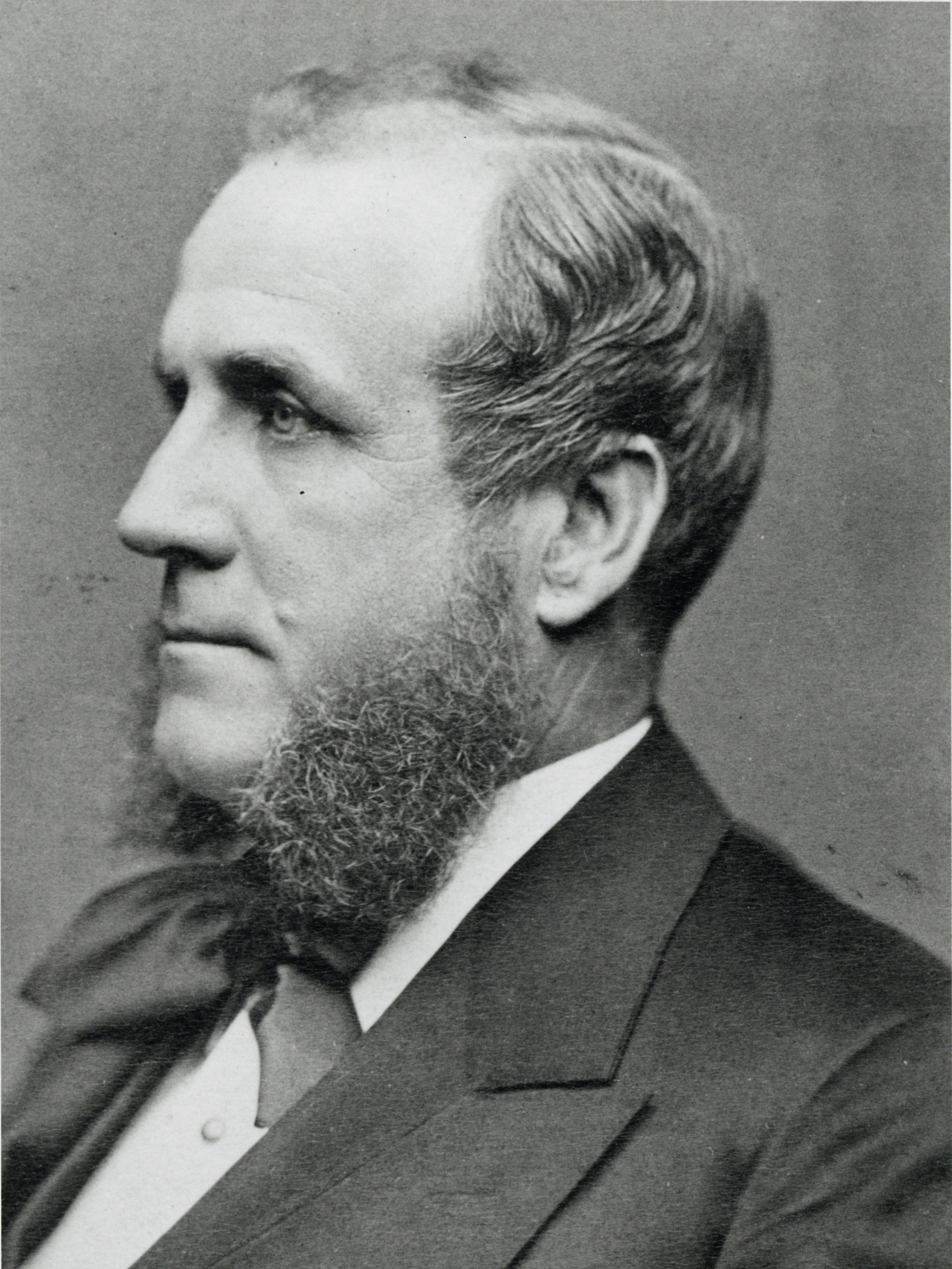

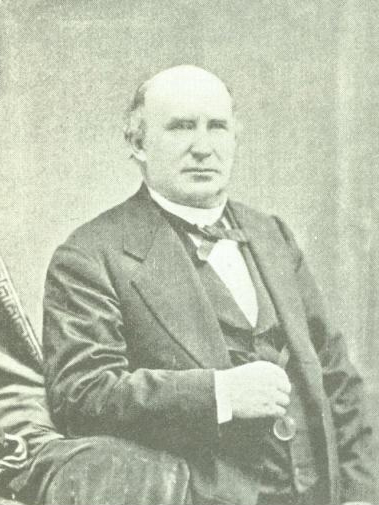
Candidate	Samuel C. Cobb	Francis B. Hayes
Party	Independent	People's Reform
Alliance	Democratic; Republican
Popular vote	17,874	835
Percentage	95.43%	4.46%
Mayor before election
Samuel C. Cobb
Independent
Elected mayor
Samuel C. Cobb
Independent

The Boston mayoral election of 1874 saw the re-election of Samuel C. Cobb.

== Nominations ==
Incumbent mayor Samuel C. Cobb (politically Nonpartisan) was disliked by many in the political establishment, but was highly popular with the Boston public. Heeding public support for Cobb, both the Democratic and Republican party organizations nominated Cobb on their tickets for the election, as they both had done in the previous election.

The People's Reform Party nominated Francis B. Hayes, a well known figure and advocate for government reform. However, Hayes did not want to be nominated for office.

== Results ==
1874 Boston mayoral election
Party	Candidate	Votes	%
Independent	Samuel C. Cobb (incumbent)	17,874	95.43
People's Reform	Francis B. Hayes	835	4.46
Others	Scattering	22	0.12
Turnout		18,731	

== See also ==
- List of mayors of Boston, Massachusetts
