= Boscawen, New Hampshire =

- Town
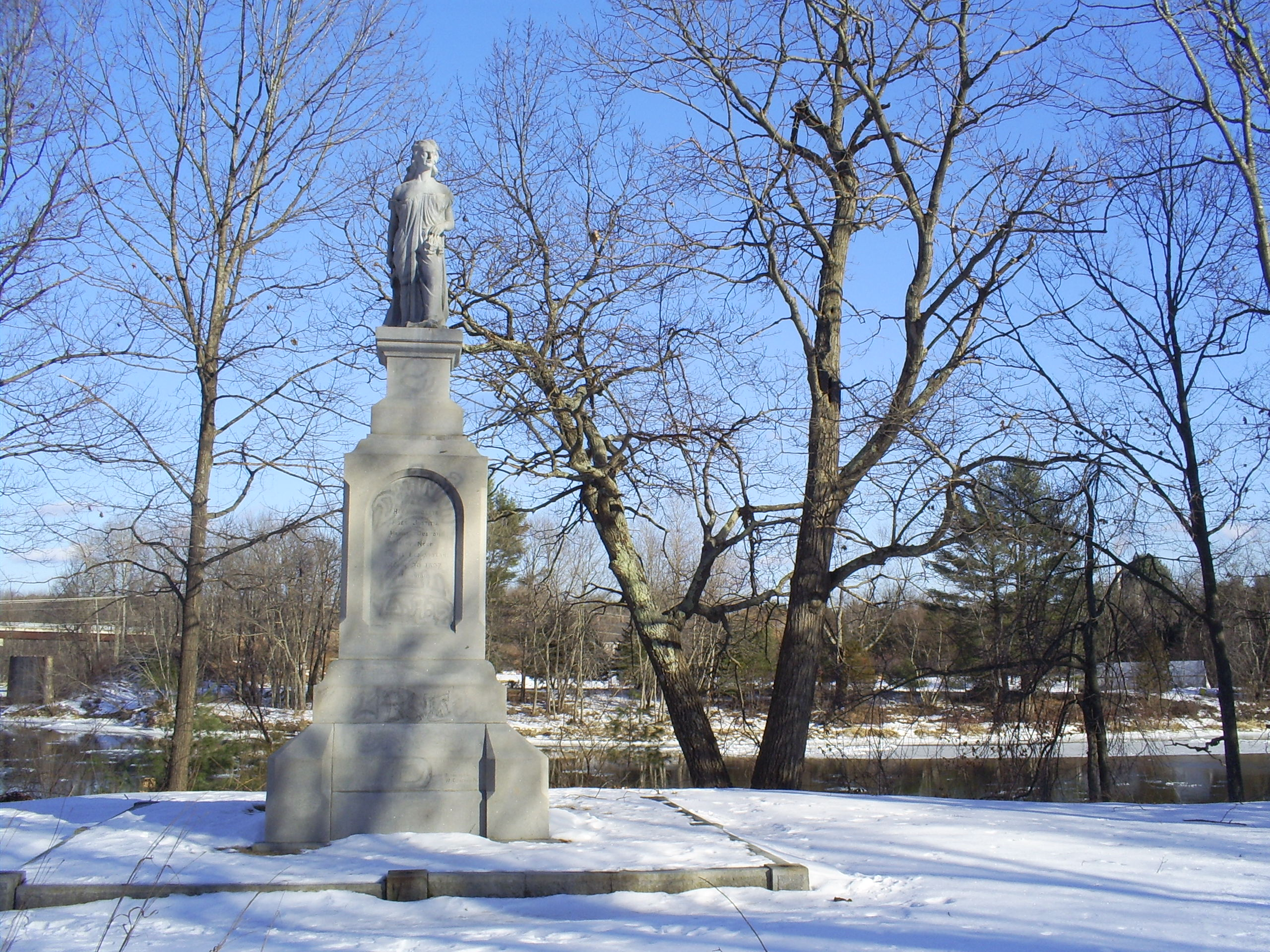
- Hannah Duston statue

- Flag Seal

- Location in Merrimack County and the state of New Hampshire.
- Coordinates: 43°19′26″N 71°39′10″W
- Country: United States
- State: New Hampshire
- County: Merrimack
- Incorporated: 1760
- Villages: Boscawen; Gerrish

Area
  - Total: 25.53 sq mi (66.12 km^{2})
  - Land: 24.89 sq mi (64.46 km^{2})
  - Water: 0.64 sq mi (1.66 km^{2}) 2.50%
- Elevation: 440 ft (130 m)

Population (2020)
  - Total: 3,998
  - Density: 160/sq mi (62/km^{2})
- Time zone: UTC-5 (Eastern)
  - Summer (DST): UTC-4 (Eastern)
- ZIP code: 03303
- Area code: 603
- FIPS code: 33-06260
- GNIS feature ID: 873547
- Website: www.boscawennh.gov

Boscawen is a town in Merrimack County, New Hampshire, United States. The population was 3,998 at the 2020 census.

== History ==
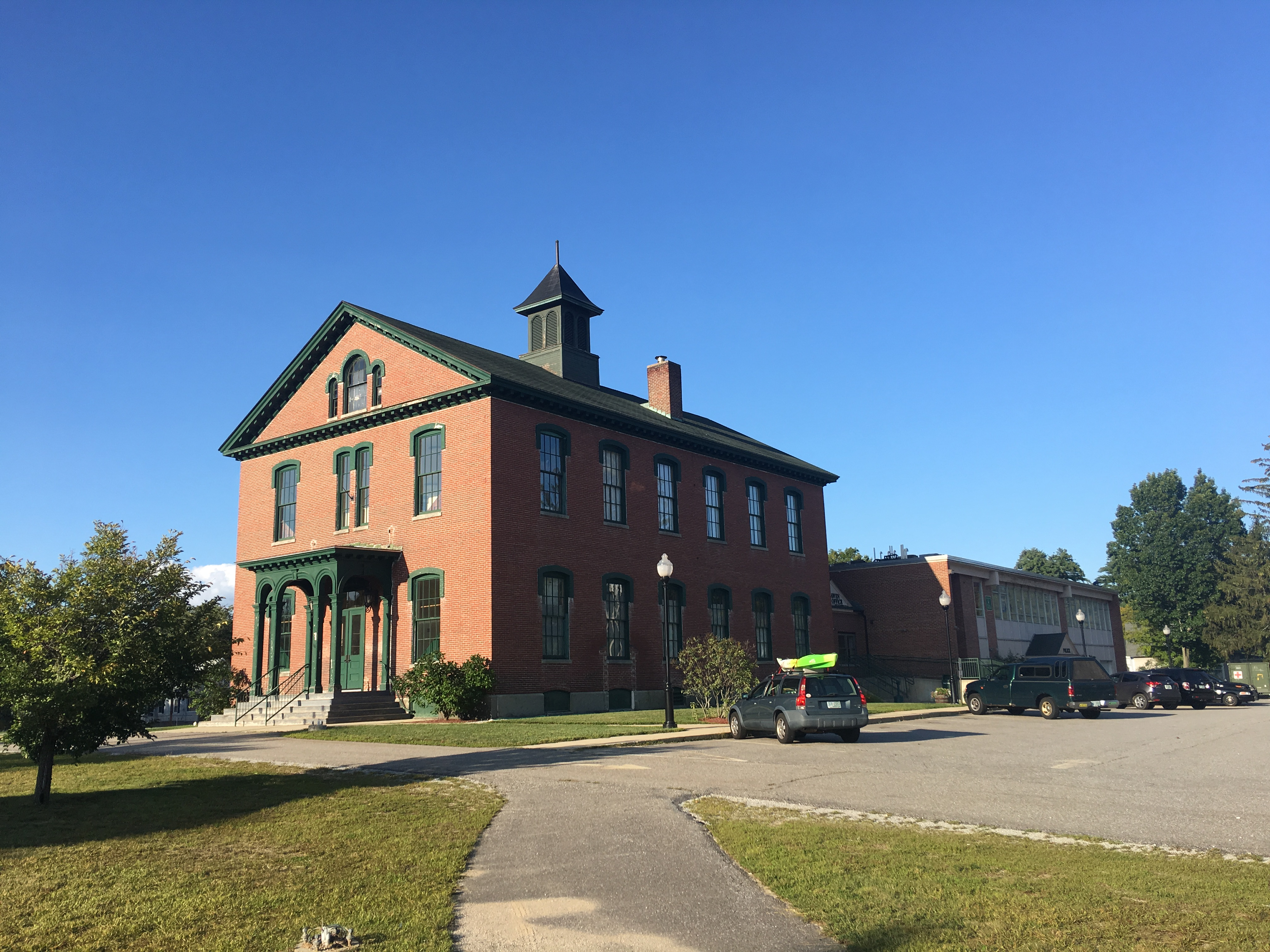
The former Penacook Academy on North Main Street, listed on the New Hampshire State Register of Historic Places, now serves as the Boscawen Municipal Facility.

The native Pennacook people called the area Contoocook, meaning "place of the river near pines". In March 1697, Hannah Duston and her nurse, Mary Neff, were captured by Abenaki Indians and taken to a temporary village on an island at the confluence of the Contoocook and Merrimack rivers, at the site of what is now Boscawen. In late April, Duston and two other captives killed ten of the Abenaki family members holding them hostage, including six children, and escaped by canoe to Haverhill, Massachusetts.

On June 6, 1733, Governor Jonathan Belcher granted the land to John Coffin and 90 others, most from Newbury, Massachusetts. Settled in 1734, the community soon had a meetinghouse, sawmill, gristmill and ferry across the Merrimack River. A garrison offered protection, but raiding parties during the French and Indian Wars left some dead or carried into captivity.

On April 22, 1760, Contoocook Plantation was incorporated as a town by Governor Benning Wentworth, who named it for Edward Boscawen, the British admiral who distinguished himself at the 1758 Siege of Louisbourg. With a generally level surface, the town provided good farmland, and became noted for its apple, pear and cherry orchards. Bounded by the Merrimack and Contoocook rivers, it had abundant sources of water power for mills.

Industries soon included a cotton mill, a woolen factory, nine sawmills, a gristmill, a saw manufacturer and machine shop, and a chair and match factory. A mill town village developed at Fisherville (now Penacook), which straddled the river border with Concord. In 1846, the Northern Railroad was built through Boscawen, opening the following winter.

Sometime around 1846, the town's postmaster became one of about a dozen in the country to issue provisional postage stamps before the official issue came out in 1847. The stamps were an adaptation of a postmark, simply reading PAID / 5 / CENTS, typeset in blue on a yellowish paper. These are extremely rare; in 2003, the estimated price at auction was US$225,000.

The 1913 Boscawen Public Library was designed by noted Boston architect Guy Lowell.

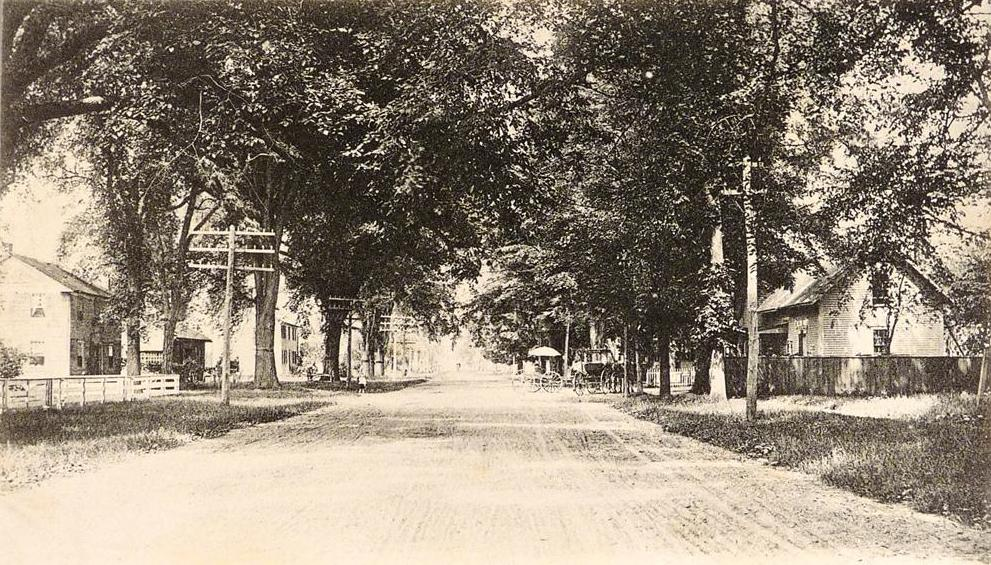
Street view c. 1905

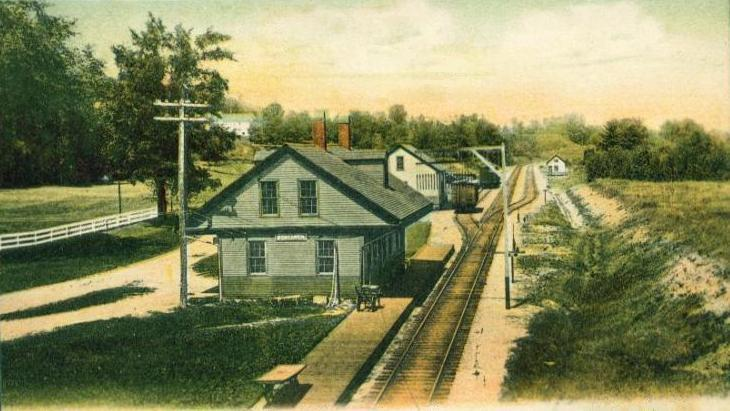
B. & M. Station in 1908

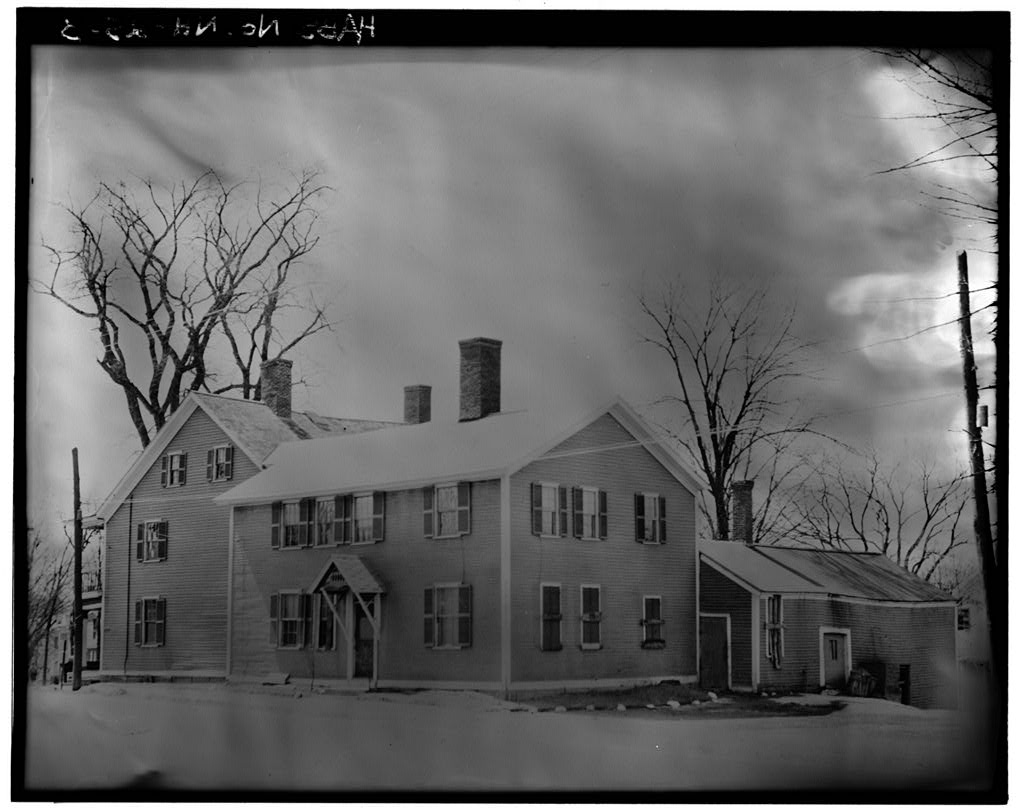
The Penacook House

== Geography ==
According to the United States Census Bureau, the town has a total area of 25.5 square miles (66.1 km^{2}), of which 24.9 square miles (64.5 km^{2}) are land and 0.66 square miles (1.7 km^{2}) are water, comprising 2.50% of the town. The highest point in Boscawen is an unnamed summit at Raleigh Farm near the town's northern border, where the elevation reaches approximately 930 feet (280 m) above sea level. The town is drained by the Merrimack River, which forms the town's eastern border, and by the Contoocook River, a tributary.

The town is served by U.S. Route 3 and U.S. Route 4. The former community of Gerrish is in the northern part of the town along Route 3.

=== Adjacent municipalities ===
- Franklin (north)
- Northfield (northeast)
- Canterbury (east)
- Concord (south)
- Webster (west)
- Salisbury (northwest)

== Demographics ==
Historical population
Census	Pop.	Note	%±
1790	1,108		—
1800	1,414		27.6%
1810	1,829		29.3%
1820	2,113		15.5%
1830	2,093		−0.9%
1840	1,965		−6.1%
1850	2,063		5.0%
1860	2,274		10.2%
1870	1,637		−28.0%
1880	1,381		−15.6%
1890	1,487		7.7%
1900	1,455		−2.2%
1910	1,240		−14.8%
1920	1,260		1.6%
1930	1,359		7.9%
1940	1,663		22.4%
1950	1,857		11.7%
1960	2,181		17.4%
1970	3,162		45.0%
1980	3,435		8.6%
1990	3,586		4.4%
2000	3,672		2.4%
2010	3,965		8.0%
2020	3,998		0.8%
U.S. Decennial Census

According to the 2019–2023 American Community Survey five-year estimates, Boscawen had 4,002 residents, 1,356 households, and approximately 854 families. The population density was 160.8/sq mi (62.1/km^{2}). There were 1,389 housing units at an average density of 55.8/sq mi (21.5/km^{2}).

The racial makeup of the town was approximately 96.75% White, 0.55% African American, 1.05% Asian, 0.00% Native American, and 1.65% from two or more races. Hispanic or Latino of any race were about 1.10% of the population.

Of the 1,356 households, roughly 26.0% had children under the age of 18 living with them, 63.0% were married couples living together, 11.0% had a female householder with no husband present, and 36.0% were non-families. About 24.0% of all households consisted of individuals, and 9.0% had someone living alone who was 65 years of age or older. The average household size was 2.60, and the average family size was about 3.00.

In terms of age distribution, 18.0% of residents were under the age of 18, 7.0% were from 18 to 24, 23.0% from 25 to 44, 29.0% from 45 to 64, and 23.0% were 65 years of age or older. The median age was 45.4 years. For every 100 females, there were about 96 males, and for every 100 females age 18 and over, there were about 94 males.

The median income for a household in the town was $80,724, and the median income for a family was $99,408.

Elektrisola Incorporated is the largest source of employment for Boscawen-area residents.

== Sites of interest ==
- Hannah Duston Memorial State Historic Site
- NH State Veterans Cemetery

== Notable people ==
- Claire D. Clarke (died 2022), New Hampshire state representative
- Moody Currier (1806–1898), 40th governor of New Hampshire
- John Adams Dix (1798–1879), 24th governor of New York, Major General in the US Civil War
- Marion Dix Sullivan (1802–1860), songwriter, composer
- Moses G. Farmer (1820–1893), electrical engineer, inventor
- William P. Fessenden (1806–1869), US senator, Secretary of the Treasury
- Charles Gordon Greene (1804–1886), journalist
- Nathaniel Greene (1797–1877), journalist
- Lucia Ames Mead (1856–1936), author
- Lyndon A. Smith (1854–1918), politician, Minnesota attorney general
- Bradford N. Stevens (1813–1885), US congressman
- Daniel Webster (1782–1852), US congressman, senator, Secretary of State
