= 1877 Boston mayoral election =

Election in Massachusetts, United States

- December 11, 1877
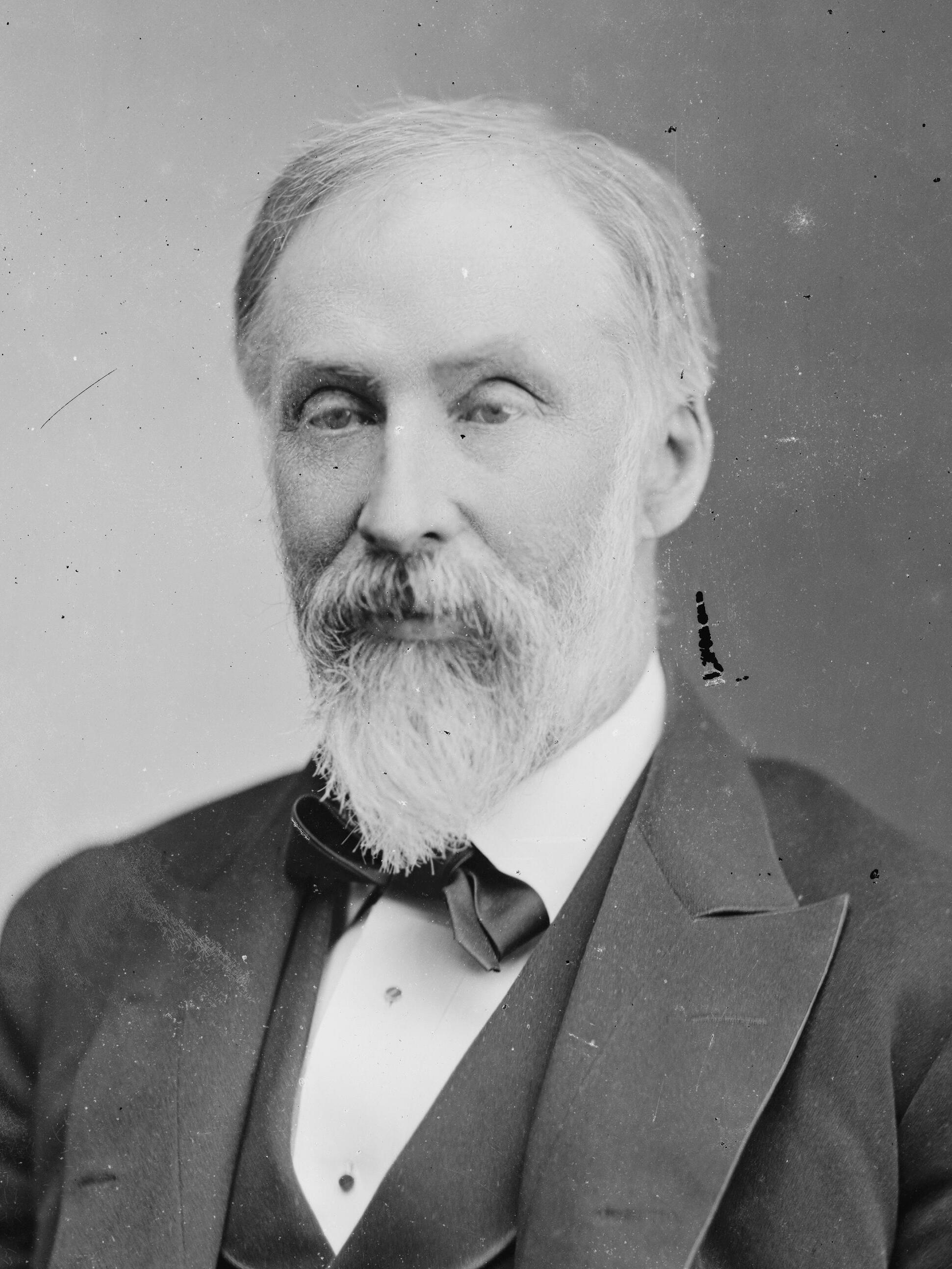

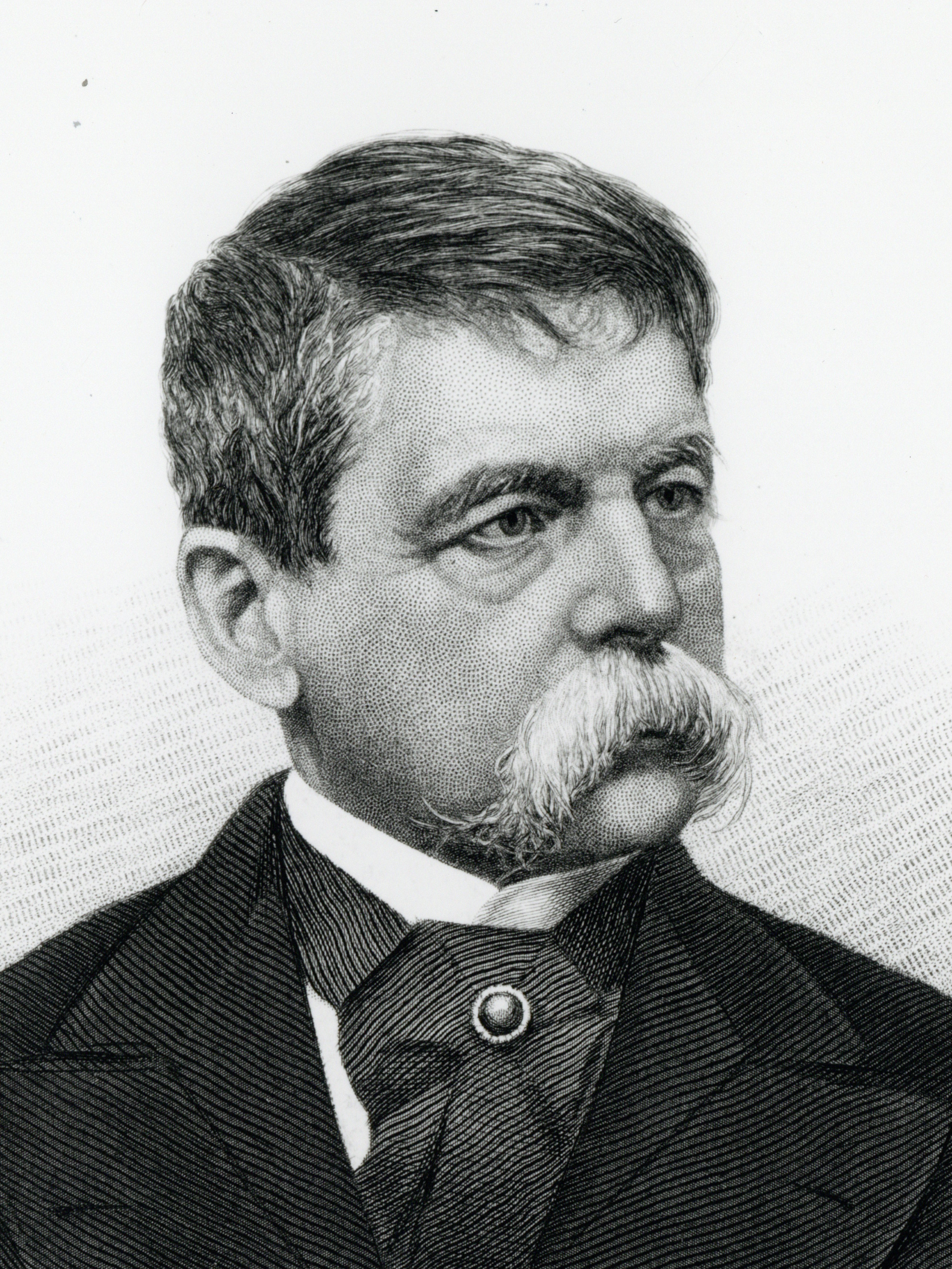
Candidate	Henry L. Pierce	Frederick O. Prince
Party	Republican (also Citizens')	Democratic
Popular vote	25,090	22,892
Percentage	52.28%	47.70%
Mayor before election
Frederick O. Prince
Democratic
Elected mayor
Henry L. Pierce
Republican

The Boston mayoral election of 1877 saw the election of Republican nominee Henry L. Pierce, who unseated incumbent Democratic mayor Frederick O. Prince.

== Nominations ==
Incumbent Democratic Party mayor Frederick O. Prince was re-nominated by his party. Henry L. Pierce was nominated by the Republican Party and the Citizens' Party, which nominated identical tickets.

== Results ==
1877 Boston mayoral election
Party	Candidate	Votes	%
Republican	Henry L. Pierce	25,090	52.28
Democratic	Frederick O. Prince (incumbent)	22,892	47.70
Others	Scattering	6	0.01
Turnout		47,988	

== See also ==
- List of mayors of Boston, Massachusetts
