= Ginery Twichell =

American politician (1811–1883)

Ginery Bachelor Twichell
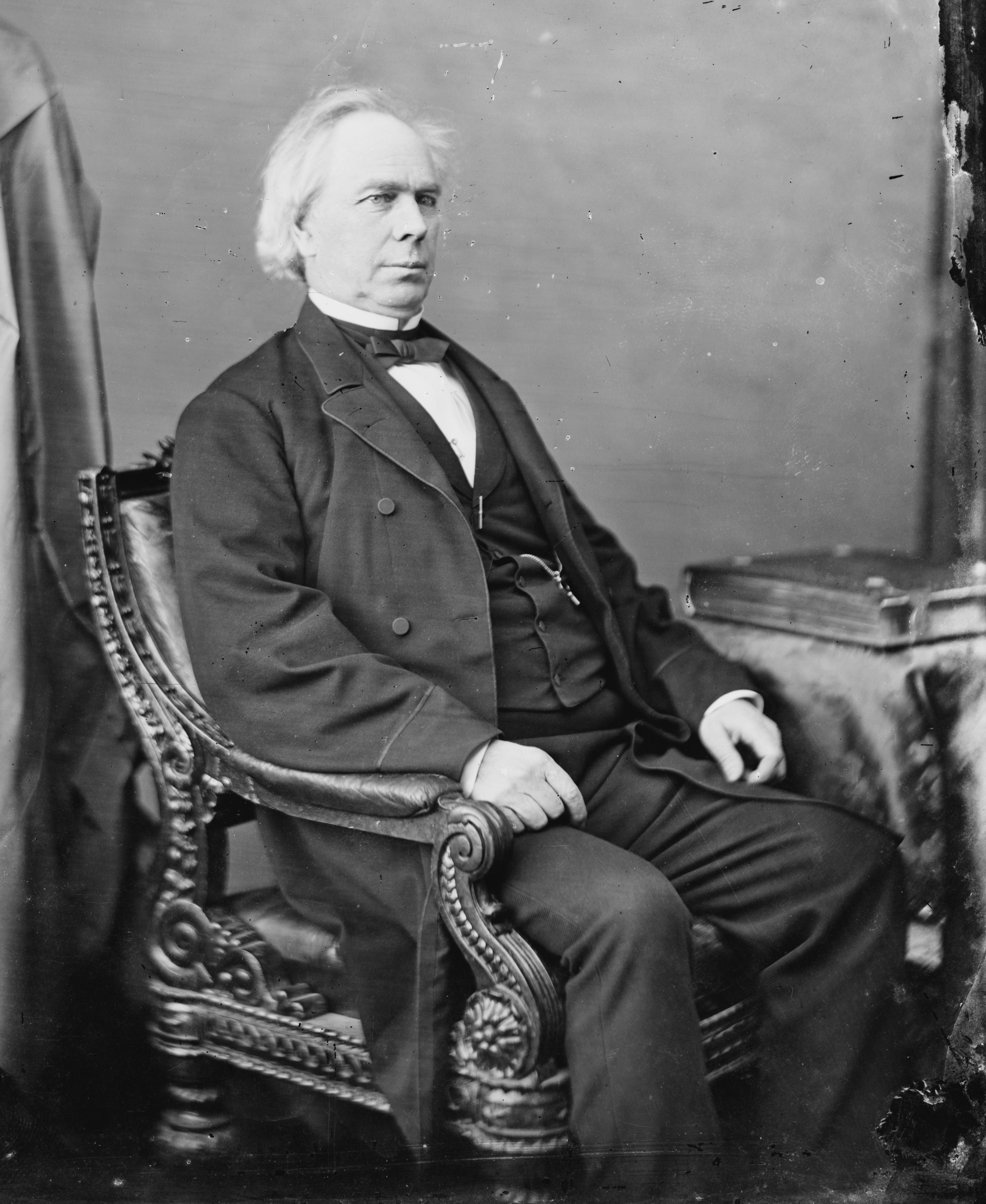

Member of the U.S. House of Representatives from Massachusetts's 3rd district
- In office March 4, 1867 – March 3, 1873
- Preceded by: Alexander H. Rice
- Succeeded by: William Whiting

Personal details
- Born: August 26, 1811 Athol, Massachusetts, U.S.
- Died: July 23, 1883 (aged 71) Brookline, Massachusetts, U.S.
- Party: Republican
- Spouses: Theolotia Ruggles (m. 1846; died 1876) Catherine M. (Burt) Vinal (m. 1877)

Ginery Twichell (August 26, 1811 – July 23, 1883) was president of the Boston and Worcester Railroad in the 1860s, the Republican Representative for Massachusetts for three consecutive terms and the sixth president of the Atchison, Topeka and Santa Fe Railway.

He was born in Athol, Massachusetts. Some references list his actual birth date as August 22, 1811 (Waters, p. 43), while others list it as August 26, 1811 (Congress Bioguide; and Massachusetts Vital Records). In 1827 Twichell left school to seek employment in a local mill. Subsequent jobs saw him working with livestock and later in retail. His strengths in transportation began to show in 1830 when he took control of a stage line between Barre and Worcester.

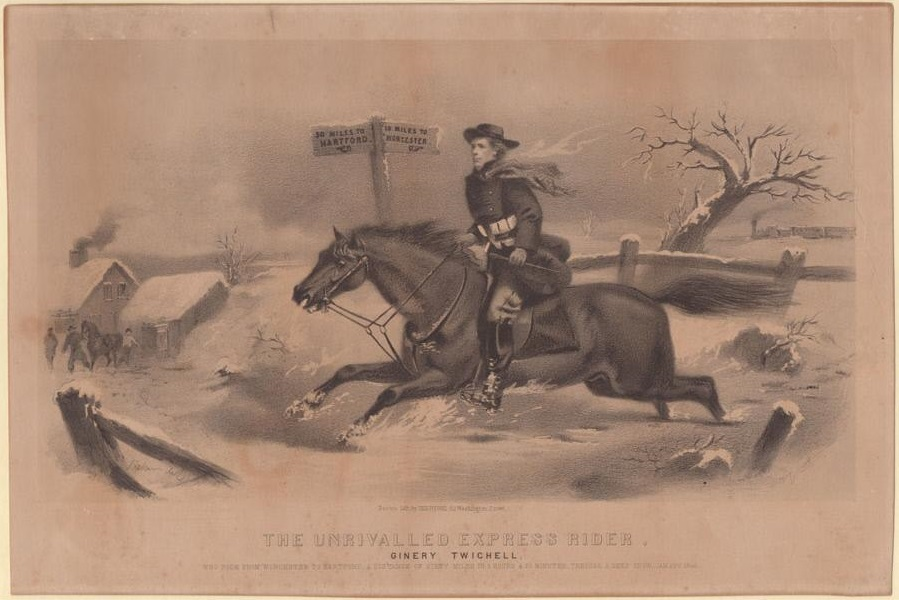
"The Unrivaled Express Rider, Ginery Twichell, Who rode from Worcester to Hartford, a distance of sixty miles in 3 hours & 20 minutes, through a deep snow, Jan. 23, 1846."

As a manager and business owner, Twichell gained a reputation for kindness and generosity, even toward his business competition. He saw his stage line grow to include many more lines throughout New England. When the Boston and Worcester Railroad (B&W) opened on July 1, 1835, Twichell's stage lines were both competition and complement to the railroad's service. This quasi-partnership lasted until June 1, 1848, when Twichell became the assistant superintendent of the railroad. Twichell rose through the B&W's ranks, becoming president in 1857.

In 1867 Twichell was elected to Congress where he served as a Republican Representative for Massachusetts. He was twice reelected, in 1869 and again in 1871, to stretch his tenure to three consecutive terms.

During his third term as a Representative, Twichell became president of the growing Atchison, Topeka and Santa Fe Railway in 1870. During his term with the Santa Fe, the railroad built the rest of the mainline across Kansas from Topeka, connecting to Dodge City, Kansas, on September 5, 1872, and then the Colorado state line by the end of 1873. Twichell served the Santa Fe Railroad for three years, leaving in 1873 to return to Massachusetts where he led the Boston, Barre and Gardner Railroad and the Hoosac Tunnel and Wilmington Railroad.

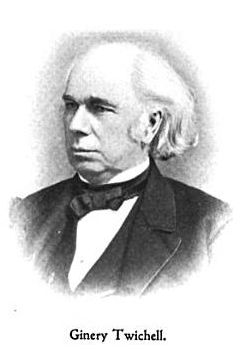
Ginery Twichell, about the time he was president of the Santa Fe

Twichell died on July 23, 1883, in Brookline, Massachusetts, of typhoid fever.

== See also ==
- Ginery Twichell House, a property he owned (but did not live in) in Brookline

U.S. House of Representatives
Preceded by Alexander H. Rice	Member of the U.S. House of Representatives from Massachusetts's 3rd congressional district March 4, 1867 – March 3, 1873	Succeeded by William Whiting
Business positions
Preceded by	President of Boston and Worcester Railroad; 1857	Succeeded by
Preceded by Henry Keyes	President of Atchison, Topeka and Santa Fe Railway; 1870 – 1873	Succeeded by Henry Strong
