= 1840 Boston mayoral election =

Election in Massachusetts, United States

- December 14, 1840
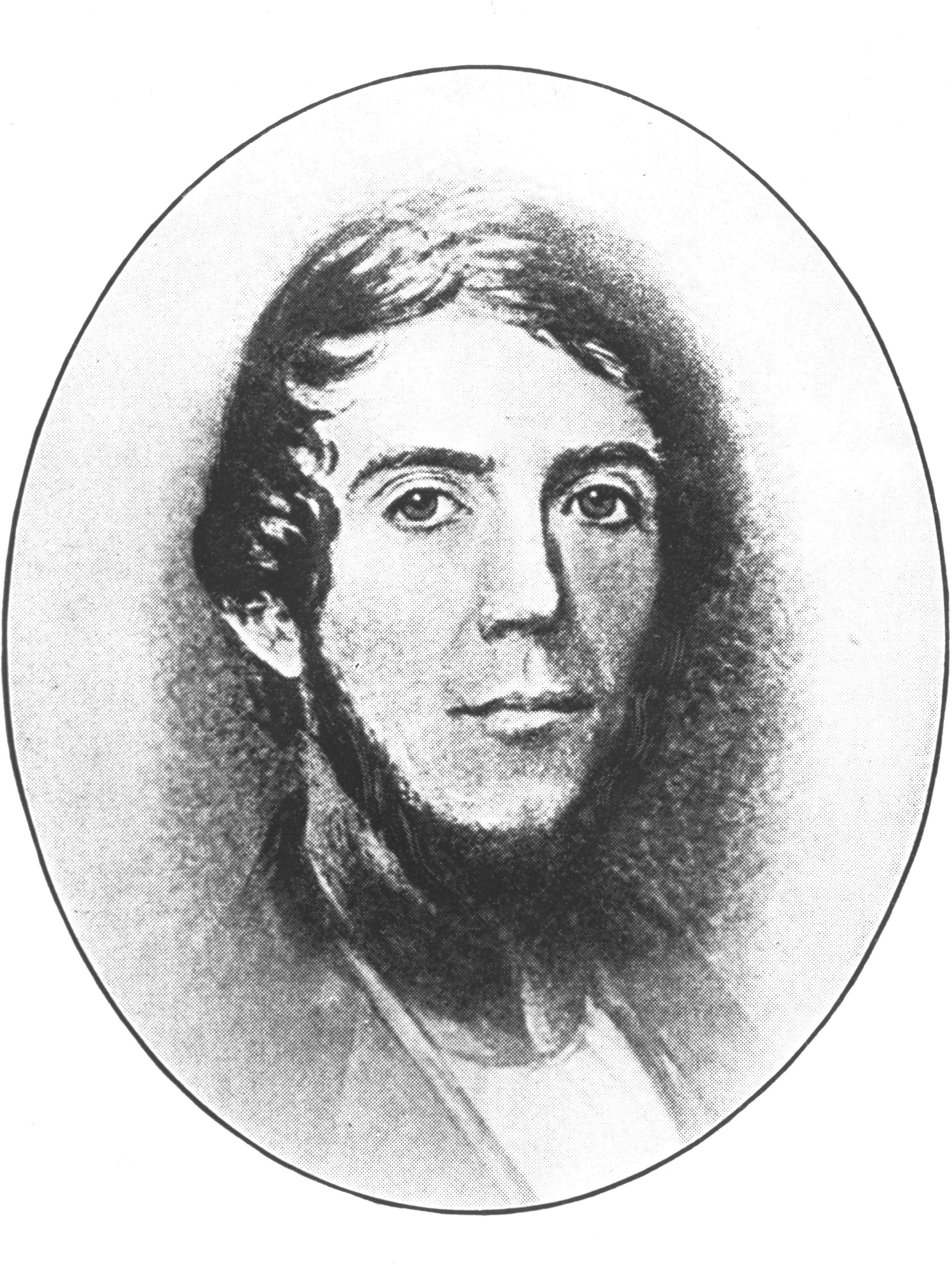

Candidate	Jonathan Chapman	Charles Gordon Greene
Party	Whig	Democratic
Popular vote	5,224	2,606
Percentage	66.52%	33.18%
Mayor before election
Jonathan Chapman
Whig
Elected mayor
Jonathan Chapman
Whig

The 1840 Boston mayoral election saw the reelection of Whig Party incumbent Jonathan Chapman. It was held on December 14, 1840.

Chapman's two-to-one share of the vote was considered a large victory.

== Campaign ==
Incumbent mayor Jonathan Chapman was the Whig Party candidate. Charles Gordon Greene was the Democratic Party/tory nominee. Very little campaigning occurred by either party, save for in a few competitive wards.

== Results ==
1840 Boston mayoral election
Party	Candidate	Votes	%
Whig	Jonathan Chapman (incumbent)	5,224	66.52
Democratic	Charles Gordon Greene	2,606	33.18
Scattering	Other	23	0.29
Total votes		7,853	100

== See also ==
- List of mayors of Boston, Massachusetts
