= Henry L. Pierce =

American politician

Henry Lillie Pierce
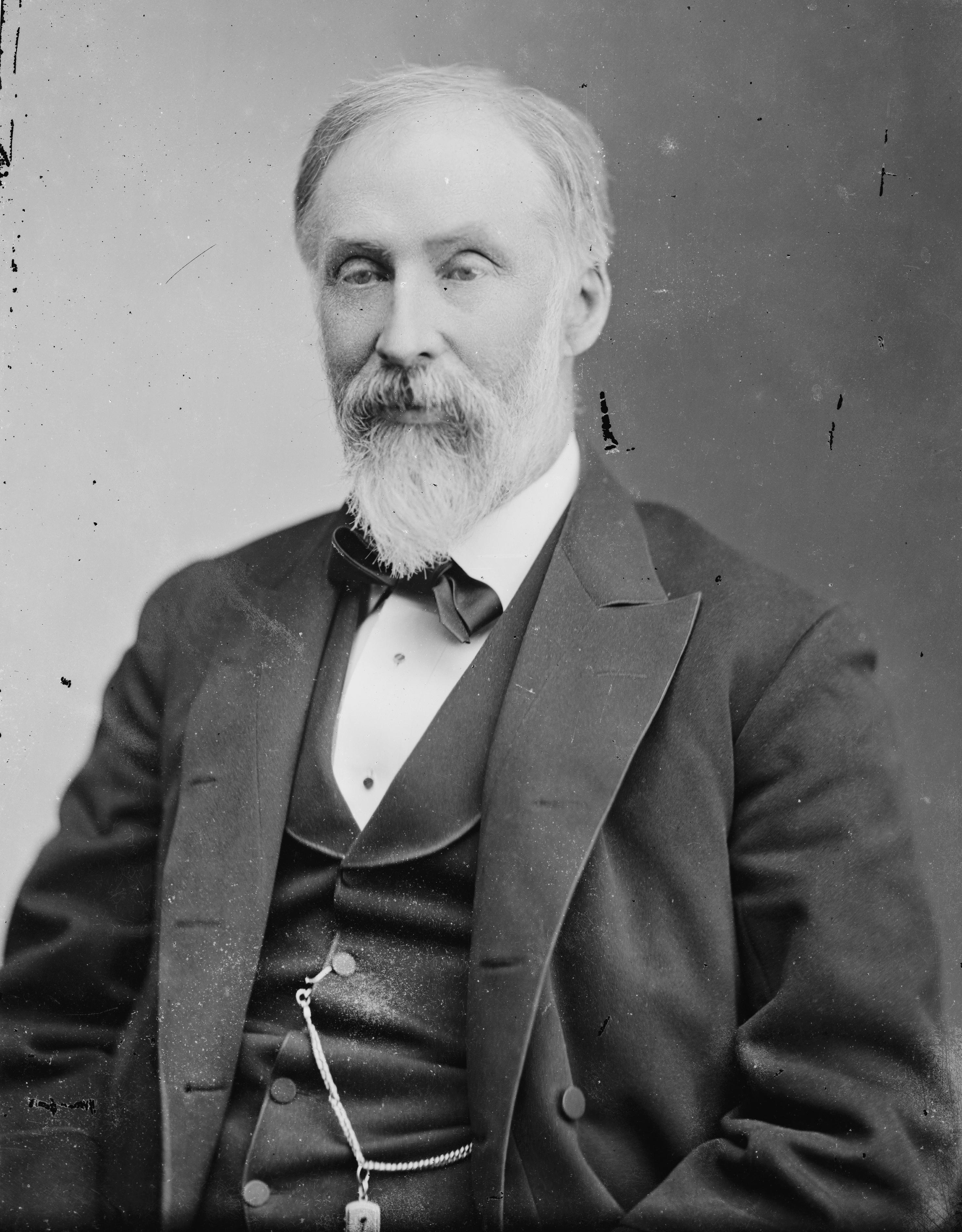
- Pierce, circa 1870–1880

Mayor of Boston
- In office 1878–1879
- Preceded by: Frederick O. Prince
- Succeeded by: Frederick O. Prince
- In office 1872–1873
- Preceded by: William Gaston
- Succeeded by: Samuel C. Cobb; Leonard R. Cutter (acting)

Member of the U.S. House of Representatives from Massachusetts's 3rd district
- In office December 1, 1873 – March 3, 1877
- Preceded by: William Whiting
- Succeeded by: Walbridge A. Field

Member of the Massachusetts House of Representatives
- In office 1860 – 1862, 1866

Personal details
- Born: August 23, 1825 Stoughton, Massachusetts, U.S.
- Died: December 17, 1896 (aged 71) Boston, Massachusetts, U.S.
- Resting place: Dorchester Burying Ground
- Party: Republican

Henry Lillie Pierce (August 23, 1825 – December 17, 1896) was a United States representative from Massachusetts. He was born in Stoughton. He attended the State normal school at Bridgewater, and was engaged in manufacturing. He served as mayor of Boston and as a Republican in the Forty-third and Forty-fourth Congresses of the United States. He declined to be a candidate for renomination, was elected again as mayor of Boston in 1877, and died in that city on December 17, 1896. His interment was in Dorchester South Burying Ground.

== Early life ==
Henry Lillie Pierce (1825–1896) was the son of Colonel Jesse Pierce (1788–1856) and Elizabeth Vose Lillie Pierce (1786–1871) of Stoughton, Massachusetts. His father was a staunch Methodist had been an educator at Milton Academy and later served in the Massachusetts House of Representatives. As a gentleman farmer, he maintained a large farm in Stoughton (formerly a part of Dorchester) until he moved, in 1849, to Washington Street in the Lower Mills of Dorchester with his wife and two sons. Edward Lillie Pierce was then attending Brown University, while Henry Lillie Pierce was at Milton Academy and was to later attend the Bridgewater Normal School. There he pursued classical studies.

== Employment with Walter Baker ==
In 1849, Henry L. Pierce was hired to work as a clerk for $3 a week at the Baker Chocolate Company. Walter Baker, the owner of the chocolate company and half-brother of Pierce's mother, hired him at a salary of three dollars per week. However, as their political views clashed and caused animosity (Pierce was a vociferous and deeply opinionated Free-Soiler), Pierce left after only a year of politically tinged employment to take up newspaper work in the Midwest. At the request of Sydney Williams, brother-in-law of Baker and managing director of the chocolate mill, Pierce returned to Boston after a year and was appointed manager of the Walter Baker Counting House at 32 South Market Street in Boston (now a part of the Quincy Market retail area). After the deaths of both Walter Baker (in 1852) and Sydney Williams (in 1854), Pierce was permitted to lease the chocolate business from the trustees of the Baker Estate.

The trustees of the Baker Estate, aware that Pierce had only been with the company for five years, leased the business to him for a two-year probationary period, "subject to a life interest payable annually to Mrs. Baker," widow of the owner and step-aunt to Pierce, until her death in 1891. He began manufacturing under the name and style of Walter Baker & Company. In 1856 the trustees extended the lease a further eight years, during which time Pierce began an expansion that would eventually absorb his competitors in the Lower Mills. The trustees continued the ten-year lease until 1884, when "all terms under the Walter Baker will having been satisfied, the entire property is conveyed by the Trustees to Henry L. Pierce." In 1860, Pierce bought the Preston Chocolate Mill from Henry Chapin, to whom it had been sold the previous year, and in 1881, Josiah Webb sold his chocolate mill to Pierce. In 1864, the trustees of the Baker Estate renewed the lease for a second decade. This decade was decisive for Pierce, as he began to enter his chocolate in competitive exhibitions both in this country and abroad. In 1867, Baker's Chocolate and Cocoa won an award in the Paris Exposition for the quality of the product. In 1873, the company won the highest awards at the Vienna Exposition, and in 1876, at the Philadelphia Centennial, Walter Baker chocolate and cocoa won the highest awards. With mill managers and mill employees, Pierce was able to expand the chocolate business and build new mills. In 1894, these were equipped with chocolate-making machines, most of which were imported from Germany, that saved power and were easy to attend.

Walter Baker Chocolate never suffered from any labor movements under Pierce's ownership, and he was regarded as a kind and well-paying employer.

== Politics ==
Pierce followed in his father's footsteps and was elected to the Massachusetts House of Representatives from 1860 to 1862, and again in 1866. He was a vociferous Radical Republican. After Dorchester was annexed to the city of Boston on January 4, 1870, Pierce became a member of the Boston Board of Aldermen. Pierce was elected as a Republican to the Forty-third Congress to fill the vacancy caused by the death of William Whiting. He was reelected to the Forty-fourth Congress and overall served from December 1, 1873, to March 3, 1877.

Pierce was elected as a 3rd Class Companion (i.e. honorary) by the Massachusetts Commandery of the Military Order of the Loyal Legion of the United States for his support of the Union during the American Civil War.

=== Mayoralty ===
Pierce was asked to run for mayor of Boston by several businessmen after the city had mismanaged a smallpox outbreak and due to a public urge for strong leadership in the aftermath of the Great Boston Fire of 1872.

Pierce was nominated and elected mayor of Boston in 1872. He took office in January 1873, and resigned the position on November 29, 1873, to serve in the United States House of Representatives for Massachusetts' 3rd congressional district. The remainder of his term (into January 1874) was served by Leonard R. Cutter.

As mayor, Pierce reorganized the Health, Police, and Fire Departments in the aftermath of the Great Fire of 1872 and established a smallpox clinic. He successfully had a commission revise the city charter and opened the Boston Public Library on Sundays

Pierce ran again for Mayor of Boston in 1877 in response to a petition urging him to do so. He again won, and served as mayor from January 1878 to January 1879.

It was during his terms as mayor that Pierce's business began an extensive marketing and public relations campaign to make Walter Baker & Company a household name or, better, the household choice for chocolate and cocoa. In 1883, the company formally adopted the trademark La Belle Chocolatiere as its logo. Used earlier in the company's history, this famous design was copied from the pastel portrait of The Chocolate Girl by Jean-Étienne Liotard, an 18th-century Swiss painter. The chocolate girl was to become as famous as the company she promoted. It was not until 1884 that the trustees of the Baker Estate allowed Pierce to purchase the company outright. Once that was done, it was incorporated as Walter Baker & Company, Ltd.

Pierce was honored by the City of Boston when the school committee voted in 1892 to name the new grammar school just south of Codman Square in his honor. The school was designed by the Boston city architect Harrison Henry Atwood (1863–1954) and was an enormous hammered granite building at the corner of Washington Street and Welles Avenue (now the site of the Codman Square Branch of the Boston Public Library). It was considered one of the most advanced schools in the Boston public school system, and after the Great Depression, its focus became that of a "baking school" which offered trade classes.

== Ownership of Walter Baker & Company ==
During Pierce's ownership of Baker Chocolate Company, from 1854 to 1896, he was to increase business greatly, so much so that he created an urban mill village with modern chocolate mills along the Neponset River. His budget for advertising and marketing was tremendous, but none was more important than the adoption of La Belle Chocolatiere as his trademark. He employed women to dress as the trademark come to life in silk gowns, with crisply starched white lawn aprons, caps and cuffs. They would act as demonstrators at exhibitions and fairs, where they offered samples of Baker's Chocolate to those in attendance. These demonstrators, with comely faces and ready smiles, were an important and appropriate way to advertise his product. An article in The New York Times on October 21, 1892, reports that these demonstrators were at an exhibition at the Madison Square Garden in New York City, where it was said that the "taste of the chocolate is its own sufficient advertisement, but the combination of chocolate and girl is particularly effective." The article went on to say that at this food show, "one of the most noticeable exhibits of this sort is made by Walter Baker & Co., who occupy a conspicuous place just opposite the main entrance to the amphitheatre. Under a silken canopy, disposed as was the canopy at old Ashby, wherein Lady Rowena watched the conquering arms of the young King Ivanhoe, a cluster of pleasing damsels dispenses the soothing 'tap' of Baker. All are dressed in the costume of 'La Belle Chocolatiere' of Liotard's painting in the Dresden Gallery, made familiar to everybody as the trademark of this old established firm. The soft draperies of the canopy are a pleasing frame for the quaint costumes and brilliant complexions of the chocolate girls, and even rival exhibitors praise the taste shown by the firm in displaying its wares so attractively."

These comely demonstrators, who elicited the praise of even the rival exhibitors at an exhibition, were only one aspect of Henry Lillie Pierce's astute ability to attract attention to his products. In her book Crowding Memories, Mrs. Thomas Bailey Aldrich, widow of the former editor of the Atlantic Monthly, wrote of Pierce as a close friend to her and her husband. She said that for "nearly twenty-five years…[he had] been one of the most loved of guests at our fireside." Pierce's "deep and unaffected friendship" for the Aldriches was sincere, and they, like many others, benefited from his estate, inheriting his farm at Ponkapoag in Canton, Massachusetts. Mrs. Aldrich summed up his character, saying that he was in all ways a strong man. "Strong in will even to obstinacy, strong in his sense of honor, strong in his love for his friends, strong in his sympathies, strong in his patriotism, strong in his likes and dislikes. To those who knew him best there was a certain charming simplicity in his character because it was the clear and direct product of his nature, unhelped by outside influences."

== Later life and death ==
Later in his life, his sight began to fail. His doctors prescribed that he should spend most of his time outside, so he bought a yacht and crossed the Atlantic thirty-five times, visiting most famous places in Europe at the time.

Pierce died from a cold that struck him with paralysis while on a trip to Chicago on December 17, 1896. His interment was in Dorchester South Burying Ground on Dorchester Avenue in Dorchester Lower Mills.

Upon his death, Henry Lillie Pierce remembered each of his employees with a gift of $100. His public bequests included one to Harvard that, at the time, was the largest such gift the college had ever received. Pierce also left equal sums to the Museum of Fine Arts, the Massachusetts Institute of Technology, the Massachusetts General Hospital and the Homeopathic Hospital, and it was said that "not in a long time has there been known such generous remembrances of public institutions and charities as in the provisions of his will."

In 1896, the City of Boston named the intersection of Dorchester Avenue and Washington and Adams Streets in Dorchester Lower Mills "Pierce Square" in memory of Henry Lillie Pierce. Today, few residents of the area know that this is the official name of the Lower Mills intersection, nor are they familiar with the myriad accomplishments of the man for whom it was named.

== See also ==
- Timeline of Boston, 1870s

Political offices
Preceded by William Gaston	Mayor of Boston, Massachusetts; January 6, 1873–November 29, 1873	Succeeded by Leonard R. Cutter
U.S. House of Representatives
Preceded by William Whiting	Member of the U.S. House of Representatives from Massachusetts's 3rd congressional district December 1, 1873 – March 3, 1877	Succeeded by Walbridge A. Field
Political offices
Preceded by Frederick O. Prince	Mayor of Boston, Massachusetts; January 7, 1878–January 6, 1879	Succeeded by Frederick O. Prince
