= 1872 Boston mayoral election =

Election in Massachusetts, United States

- December 10, 1872
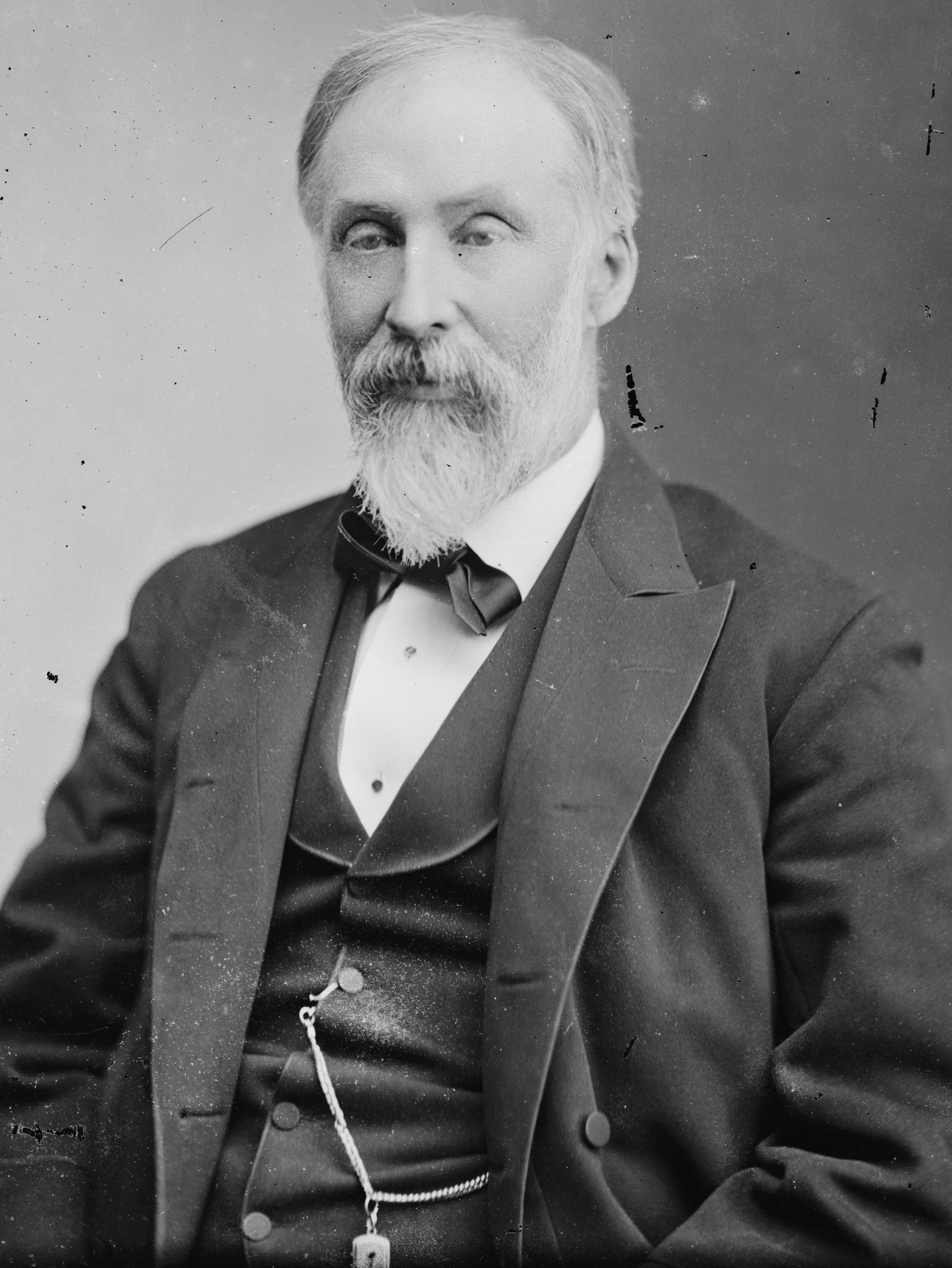

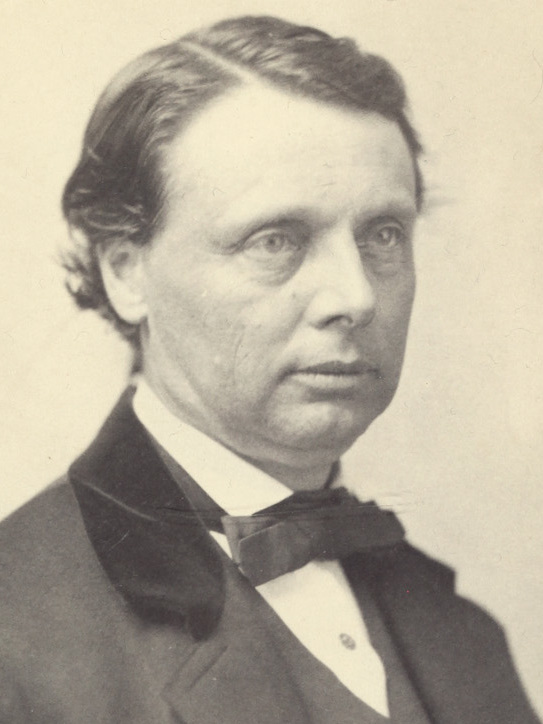
Candidate	Henry L. Pierce	William Gaston
Party	Republican	Democratic
Alliance	Citizens'; Labor Reform	Liberal Republican
Popular vote	8,877	8,798
Percentage	50.11%	49.66%
Mayor before election
William Gaston
Democrat
Elected mayor
Henry L. Pierce
Republican

The Boston mayoral election of 1872 saw the election of Republican nominee Henry L. Pierce, who narrowly unseated incumbent Democratic mayor William Gaston.

== Nominations ==
=== William Gaston by the Democratic Party and other parties ===
Incumbent Democratic mayor William Gaston was nominated on the ticket of the city's regular Democratic Party organization. The city's Liberal Republican ticket nominated Gaston as well.

=== Henry L. Pierce by the Republican Party and other parties ===
Republican former congressman Henry L. Pierce was nominated on the ticket of the city's regular Republican Party organization. He was additionally nominated on the tickets of the city's Citizens' Party (which ran as "The People's Ticket") and the Labor Reform Party ticket.

== Results ==
1872 Boston mayoral election
Party	Candidate	Votes	%
Republican	Henry L. Pierce	8,877	50.11
Democratic	William Gaston (incumbent)	8,798	49.66
Others	Scattering	41	0.23
Turnout		17,716	

== See also ==
- List of mayors of Boston, Massachusetts
