= 1873 Texas lieutenant gubernatorial election =

- December 2, 1873
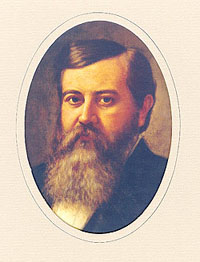

Nominee	Richard B. Hubbard	Robert H. Taylor
Party	Democratic	Republican
Popular vote	86,825	42,812
Percentage	66.96%	33.02%
Lieutenant Governor before election
Vacant
Elected Lieutenant Governor
Richard B. Hubbard
Democratic

The 1873 Texas lieutenant gubernatorial election was held on December 2, 1873, in order to elect the lieutenant governor of Texas. Democratic candidate and Richard B. Hubbard defeated Republican candidate Robert H. Taylor by a wide margin.

== General election ==
The election was the first following Texas' readmission to the Union following its administration under military Reconstruction.

=== Candidates ===
- Richard B. Hubbard, former state representative (Democrat)
- Robert H. Taylor, former state representative and state senator (Republican)

=== Results ===
Texas lieutenant gubernatorial election, 1873
Party	Candidate	Votes	%	±%
Democratic	Richard B. Hubbard	86,825	66.96	▲39.86
Republican	Robert H. Taylor	42,812	33.02	▼16.13
Total votes		129,637	100.00	
Democratic gain from Republican				

== Aftermath ==
The outcome of the election was controversial, and like many elections from the era it was characterized by fraud and voter intimidation on both sides. Within the month, the Texas Supreme Court ruled the election had been unconstitutionally conducted in the case Ex parte Rodriguez, an extraordinary habeas corpus writ holding that the election had been unconstitutional because the polls were only open for one day. The new Constitution of 1869 had provided in Article III, Section 6, that all elections would be held "at the county seats of the several counties until otherwise provided by law; and the polls shall be opened for four days." Since the decision hinged crucially on the interpretation of the semi-colon, Texan historians have referred to the Court during this period as the "Semicolon Court," following its use by Oran Milo Roberts in his history of the Reconstruction period in the state.

The Ex parte Rodriguez ruling was never enforced. On January 15, disregarding the court's ruling and on the belief that incumbent Republican Governor Edmund Davis had stationed militiamen on the first floor of the Texas State Capitol in an attempt to continue his hold on the office, a group of Democrats entered using keys through the second to have Democratic candidate Richard Coke sworn into office. Davis summoned state troops to his defense, but upon their arrival, they joined Coke. Coke was sworn in and Davis swore for a truce; after President Ulysses S. Grant declined to send federal troops to aid his hold on the Capitol, Davis left office peacefully on January 19, bringing an effective end to the Reconstruction era in Texas. As a result of the election, the Democratic Party would become the dominant political party in Texas for more than a century.

Hubbard was the first lieutenant governor to take the oath of office since 1866. (Note: James W. Flanagan had won the office in the 1869 election and presided over a provisional session of the legislature, but did not take the oath of office before being appointed to a United States Senate seat by the legislature.)
