= Charles Gordon Greene =

American journalist and politician

Member of the Massachusetts House of Representatives

Personal details
- Born: July 1, 1804 Boscawen, New Hampshire
- Died: September 27, 1886 (aged 82) Boston, Massachusetts
- Party: Democrat
- Spouse: Charlotte Hill
- Education: Bradford Academy
- Occupation: journalist

Charles Gordon Greene (July 1, 1804 – September 27, 1886) was an American journalist.

== Biography ==
Greene was born at Boscawen, New Hampshire. He was the brother of Nathaniel Greene, in whose care he was placed on the death of his father in 1812, and who sent him to the Bradford Academy. Subsequently, he entered his brother's office in Haverhill, Massachusetts, and, following his brother to Boston, he assisted in editing the Boston Statesman. He then had brief engagements managing and editing the Taunton Free Press (1825) and then publishing the Boston Spectator (1826). He married Charlotte Hill in Boston on October 24, 1827.

Greene settled in Philadelphia in 1827, and with James A. Jones started the National Palladium, in which the presidential candidacy of Andrew Jackson was vigorously advocated. In 1828 Greene was on the staff of the United States Telegraph in Washington, D.C., until after Jackson's election, when he returned to the Boston Statesman, where he succeeded his brother as proprietor. He founded The Boston Post in 1831 and conducted it until 1875. Greene served in the Massachusetts Legislature, and was naval officer of Boston from 1853 to 1861.

He died in Boston on September 27, 1886.

== See also ==
- Okay ("O.K." - a wordplay for "Oll Korrect") that has come to mean affirmation or acknowledgement.
- 1840 Boston mayoral election
- 1844–45 Boston mayoral election
