= 1857 Wisconsin lieutenant gubernatorial election =

- November 3, 1857
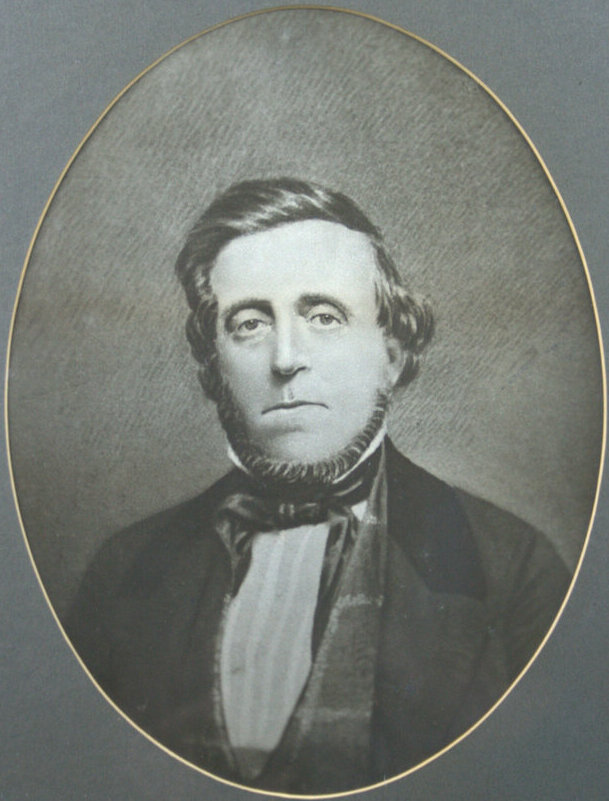

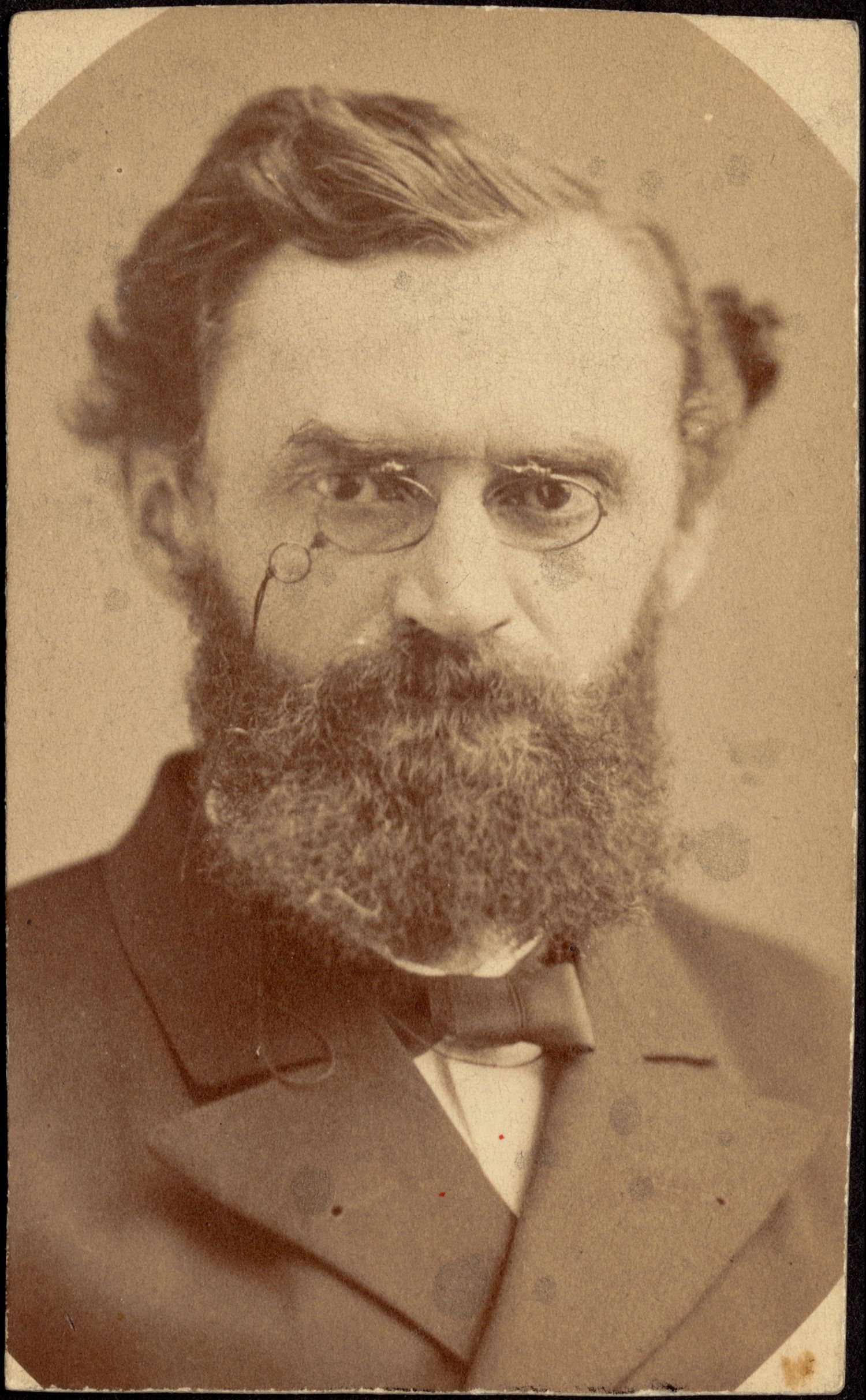
Nominee	Erasmus D. Campbell	Carl Schurz
Party	Democratic	Republican
Popular vote	45,053	44,844
Percentage	50.10%	49.86%
Lieutenant Governor before election
Arthur MacArthur Sr.
Democratic
Elected Lieutenant Governor
Erasmus D. Campbell
Democratic

The 1857 Wisconsin lieutenant gubernatorial election was held on November 3, 1857, in order to elect the lieutenant governor of Wisconsin. Democratic nominee and incumbent mayor of La Crosse Erasmus D. Campbell defeated Republican nominee Carl Schurz.

== Democratic state convention ==
The Democratic state convention was held in Madison on August 28, 1857, in order to nominate the state officers for the november election. Incumbent mayor of La Crosse Erasmus D. Campbell received 83 votes over former member of the Wisconsin Senate Henry M. Billings, who received 51 votes. Campbell was thus elected as the nominee for the general election.

=== Results ===
1857 Democratic lieutenant gubernatorial nomination
Party	Candidate	Votes	%
Democratic	Erasmus D. Campbell	83	61.94%
Democratic	Henry M. Billings	51	38.06%
Total votes		134	100.00%

== General election ==
On election day, November 3, 1857, Democratic nominee Erasmus D. Campbell won the election by a margin of 209 votes against his opponent Republican nominee Carl Schurz, thereby retaining Democratic control over the office of lieutenant governor. Campbell was sworn in as the 6th lieutenant governor of Wisconsin on January 4, 1858.

=== Results ===
Wisconsin lieutenant gubernatorial election, 1857
Party	Candidate	Votes	%
Democratic	Erasmus D. Campbell	45,053	50.10
Republican	Carl Schurz	44,844	49.86
	Scattering	38	0.04
Total votes		89,935	100.00
Democratic hold			
