= Leonard R. Cutter =

American politician

Leonard Richardson Cutter
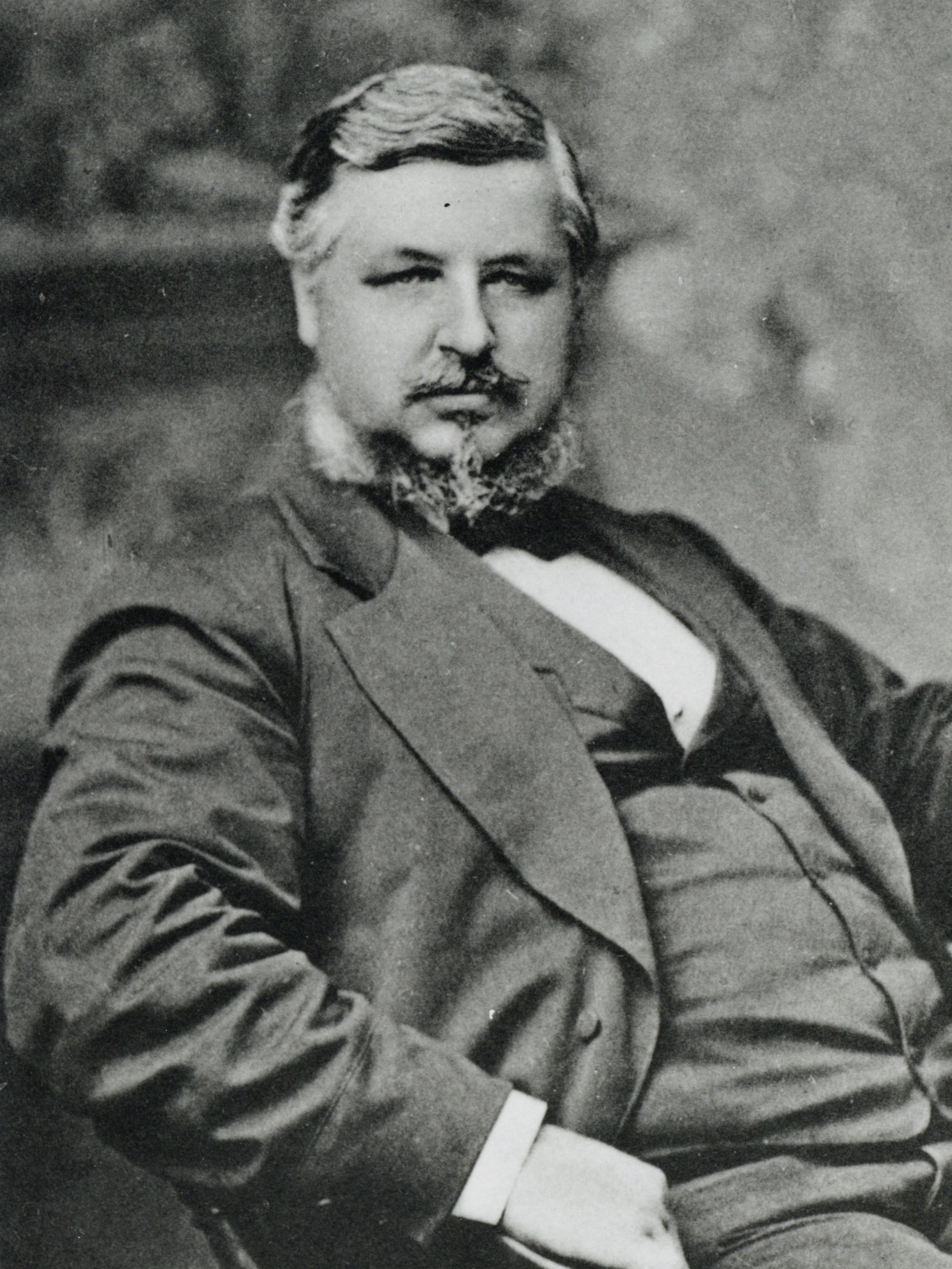

Acting Mayor of Boston, Massachusetts
- In office November 29, 1873 – January 5, 1874
- Preceded by: Henry L. Pierce
- Succeeded by: Samuel C. Cobb

Chairman of the Boston Board of Aldermen
- In office 1873
- Preceded by: Samuel Little
- Succeeded by: John Taylor Clark

Personal details
- Born: July 1, 1825 Jaffrey, New Hampshire, U.S.
- Died: July 13, 1894 (aged 69) Boston, Massachusetts, U.S.
- Party: Democratic
- Spouse: Mercy Taylor
- Children: Agnes Elizabeth Cutler, Emma Adelaide Cutler
- Education: Harvard
- Occupation: Grocer, Real Estate Broker

Leonard Richardson Cutter (July 1, 1825 – July 13, 1894) was the Chairman of the Board of Aldermen of Boston, Massachusetts in 1873, and served as the acting mayor of Boston from November 29, 1873, to January 5, 1874, after the resignation of Henry L. Pierce. His mayoralty of 37 days is the second shortest of any of Boston's mayors.

== Early life ==
Leonard Richardson Cutter was born on July 1, 1825, in Jaffrey, New Hampshire. He was a teacher for three years there before leaving for Boston at the age of 20. He initially lived in the West End neighborhood and worked as a grocer. Around a decade later, he became a successful real estate agent and landlord and moved to the Beacon Hill neighborhood.

== Political career ==
Cutter's political career began when he served for several years as a justice of the peace. From 1859 to 1861 he was a city assessor.

Cutter became a member of Boston's Board of Aldermen in 1870. He became its chairman in 1873.

=== Mayoralty ===
On November 29, 1873, Mayor Henry L. Pierce resigned to serve in the House of Representatives for Massachusetts' 3rd congressional district. Pursuant to Section 29 of the municipal charter, Cutter became acting mayor, having the full power of the mayor, with the exception of mayoral veto authority.

He held power as both the chairman of the Board of Aldermen for the remainder of the year, as well as mayor, an act that was approved by his colleagues.

He served out the remainder of Pierce's mayoral term. He was succeeded by Samuel B. Cobb on January 5, 1874, after only 37 days of being mayor.

=== Later career ===
After stepping down as mayor, Cutter served a fourth year as an alderman. He served until 1883 on Boston's water board, being its chairman for four years. He had eight overlapping years where he served as Boston's water commissioner.

== Death ==
Cutter died in his home in Boston's Back Bay neighborhood on July 13, 1894. He was 69 years old.

== See also ==
- Timeline of Boston, 1870s

Political offices
Preceded by Henry L. Pierce	Mayor of Boston, Massachusetts (acting); November 29, 1873 – January 5, 1874	Succeeded by Samuel C. Cobb
