= William Whiting (Massachusetts politician) =

American politician (1813–1873)

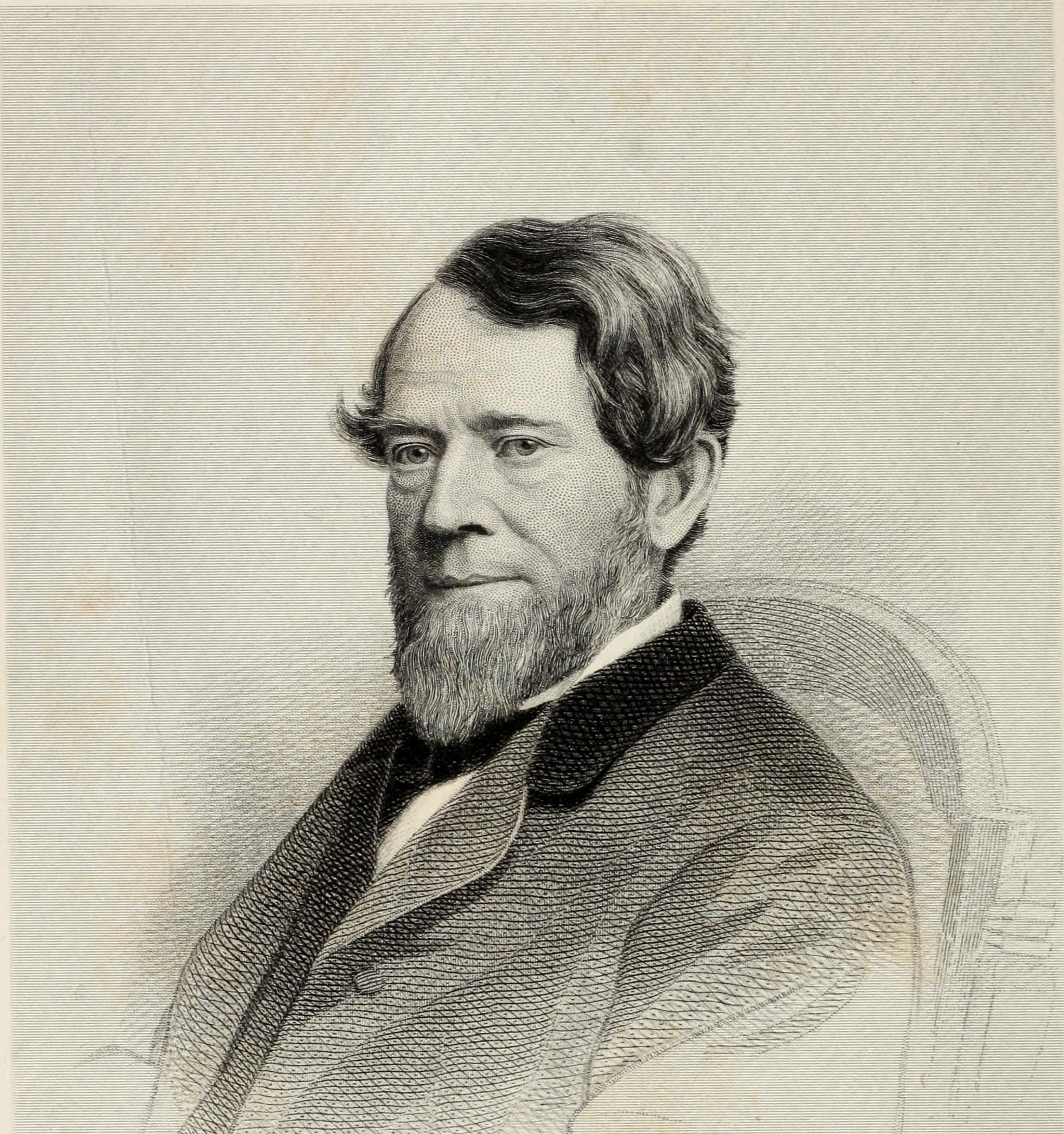

Member of the U.S. House of Representatives from Massachusetts's 3rd district
- In office March 4, 1873 – June 29, 1873
- Preceded by: Ginery Twichell
- Succeeded by: Henry L. Pierce

Personal details
- Born: March 3, 1813 Concord, Massachusetts, U.S.
- Died: June 29, 1873 (aged 60) Boston, Massachusetts, U.S.
- Party: Republican

William Whiting (March 3, 1813 – June 29, 1873) was a United States representative from Massachusetts. He was born in Concord on March 3, 1813. He attended Harvard University in 1833. He taught school in Plymouth and Concord. Whiting graduated from Harvard Law School in 1838. He was admitted to the bar the same year and commenced practice in Boston. He served as solicitor of the War Department 1862–1865. In 1868 he was a presidential elector, and in 1872 was elected as a Republican to the Forty-third Congress. He served from March 4, 1873, until his death in Boston on June 29 that same year. His interment was in Sleepy Hollow Cemetery in Concord.

Colby University gave him the degree of LL.D. in 1872. He left $5,000 to Harvard for a scholarship. Whiting was for five years president of the New England Historic Genealogical Society.

== Works ==
His principal work is The War Powers of the President and the Legislative Powers of Congress in Relation to Rebellion, Treason, and Slavery (Boston, 1862; 10th ed., with large additions, 1863; 43rd ed., 1871). In this he formulated views that he had urged at the opening of the American Civil War, namely, that the U. S. government had full belligerent rights against the inhabitants of seceded states, and without going beyond the Constitution could confiscate their property, emancipate their slaves, and treat them as public enemies. These opinions were at first received with caution by most public men, but they were finally sanctioned and adopted by the government. The book had a large sale in the United States and abroad.

Besides this, he published various pamphlets, chiefly legal arguments before the U. S. courts; a "Memoir of Rev. Joseph Harrington," prefixed to a volume of his sermons (Boston, 1854); and Memoirs of Rev. Samuel Whiting and of his Wife, Elizabeth St. John, with Reference to some of their English Ancestors and American Descendants (printed privately, Boston, 1871).

== See also ==
- List of members of the United States Congress who died in office (1790–1899)

U.S. House of Representatives
Preceded by Ginery Twichell	Member of the U.S. House of Representatives from Massachusetts's 3rd congressional district March 4, 1873 – June 29, 1873	Succeeded by Henry L. Pierce
