= Hérault (disambiguation) =

Hérault is a department in the southwest of France.

Hérault may also refer to:

- Hérault (river) which give its name to the department
- René Hérault (1691–1740), magistrate and Lieutenant General of Police of Paris from 1725 to 1739
- Marie-Jean Hérault de Séchelles (1759–1794), French politician during the time of the French Revolution.
