= Jean-Étienne Liotard =

Painter, art dealer, and Turkophile (1702–1789)

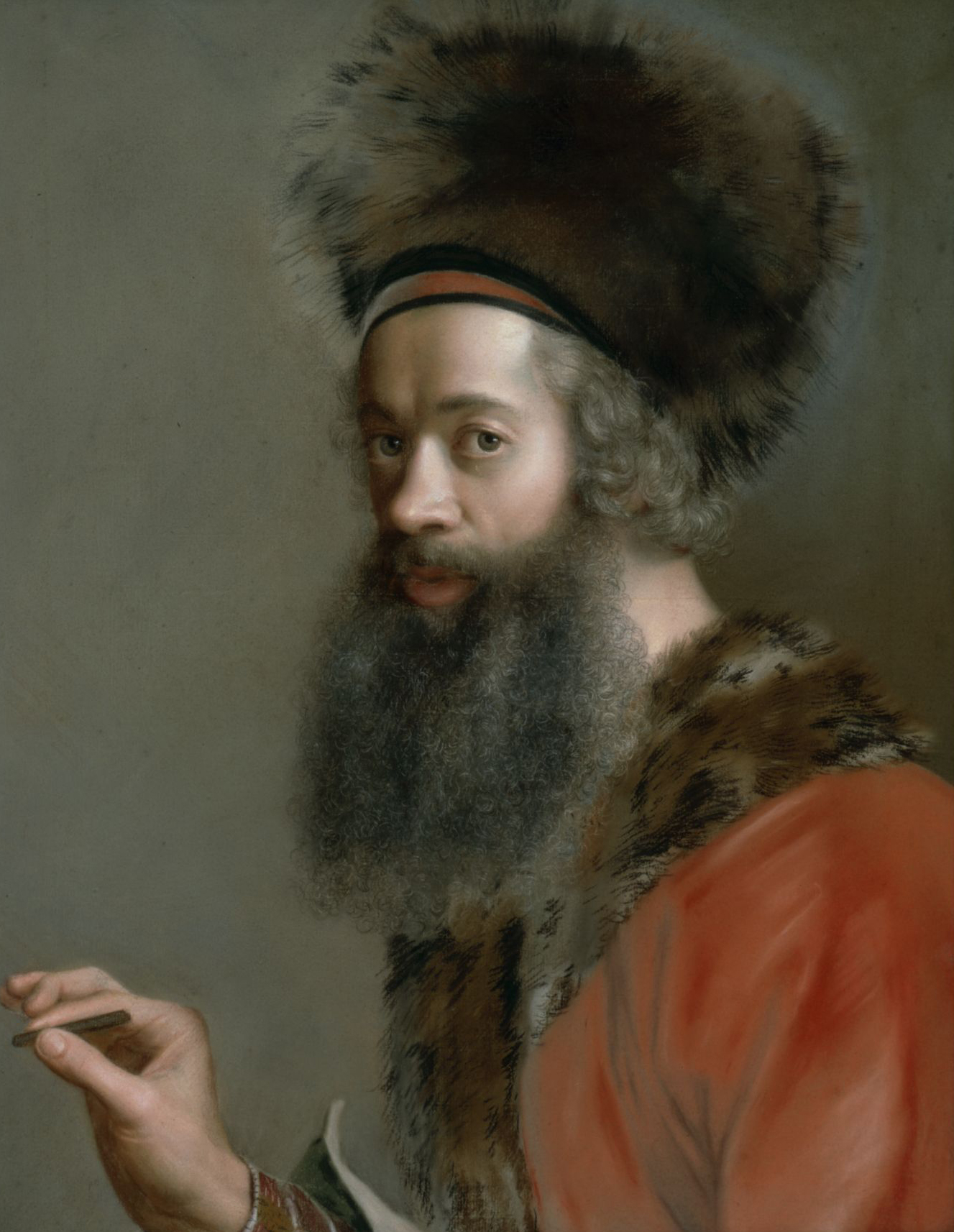
Self-portrait (1746) in pastel, his favourite medium. The full beard he wore after visiting Turkey was an eccentricity in 18th century Europe.

Jean-Étienne Liotard (French pronunciation: [ʒɑ̃ etjɛn ljɔtaʁ]; 22 December 1702 – 12 June 1789) was a Genevan painter, pastellist, printmaker, art theorist and art dealer. Born in the Republic of Geneva as the son of exiled French Huguenots, he spent most of his career working in cities such as Rome, Istanbul, Paris, Vienna, London, Amsterdam and other cities. He is best known for his detailed, strikingly naturalistic portraits in pastel and Orientalist scenes of life in Turkey. As an art theorist he wrote the Traité des Principes et règles de la Peinture (Treatise on the Principles and Rules of Painting) in which he argued that painting should to be a mirror of nature.

== Life ==
Liotard was born in Geneva as the son of Antoine, a merchant and citizen of Geneva, and Anne Sauvage. His parents were French Protestants who had fled to Geneva after 1685. He had a twin brother called Jean-Michel (1702–1796) who became a draughtsman and engraver. Jean-Étienne Liotard began his art studies in Geneva under miniature painter Daniel Gardelle in whose workshop he studied enamel and miniature painting. He produced several portraits showing his talent.

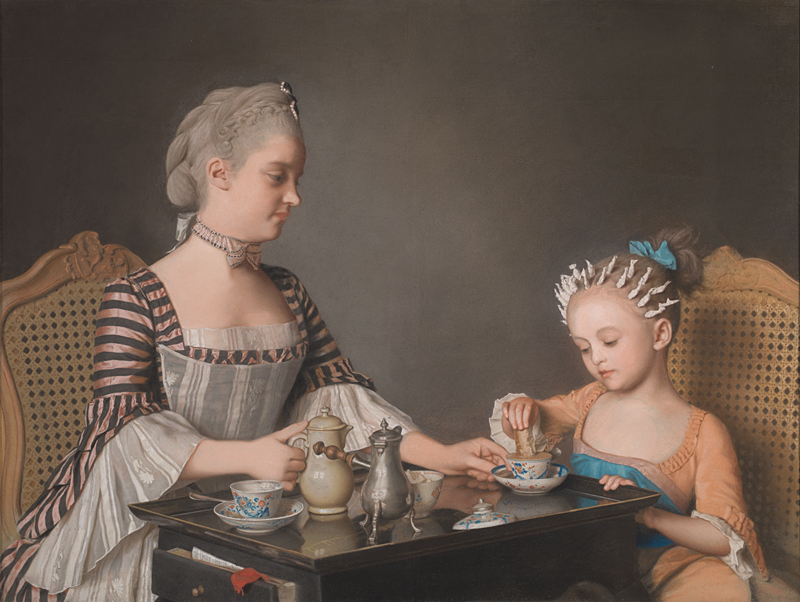
Breakfast of the Lavergne family, 1752, pastel on vellum, National Gallery, London

He studied with Gardelle for only about four months and left in 1725 for Paris where he joined the workshop of the miniaturist Jean-Baptiste Massé. He remained there for three years during which he made many copies as his relationship with Massé not that of an apprenticeship but rather of a job placement (allouage). Around 1728 he set up his own workshop. In 1732 he submitted a painting for the painting prize competition organised by the Académie royale de peinture et de sculpture ("Royal Academy of Painting and Sculpture") on the mandatory subject that year of The high priest Achimelech hands David the sword of Goliath. His submission did not win any price. Around this time he painted more enamels than pastels. He produced some portrait prints of Voltaire and Fontenelle which he advertised in local media. In 1735 he travelled with Louis Philogène Brûlart, the French ambassador to Naples and Rome. In Rome he painted the portraits of Pope Clement XII and several cardinals. He also 1737, he made lost pastels of the exiled James Francis Edward Stuart, the House of Stuart claimant to the thrones of England, Ireland and Scotland, and his sons. In 1738 he accompanied Lord Duncannon to Constantinople, where he worked for the next four years.

Liotard visited Istanbul and painted numerous pastels of Turkish domestic scenes. Using modern dress was considered unheroic and inelegant in history painting using Middle Eastern settings, with Europeans wearing local costume, as travellers were advised to do. He continued to wear Turkish dress a long time after returning to Europe. This adoption of oriental costume secured him the nickname of "the Turkish painter".

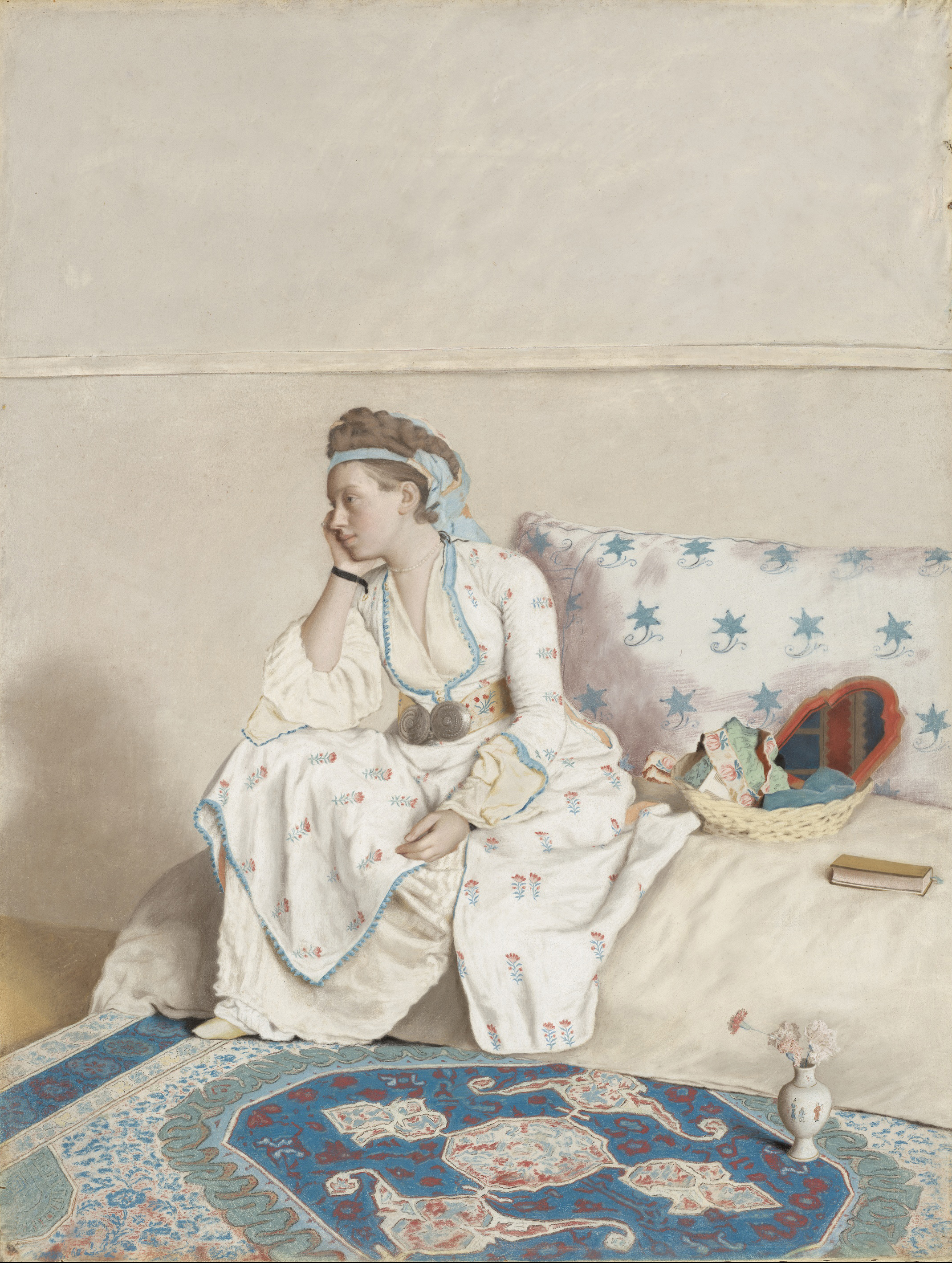
Portrait of Liotard's wife Marie Fargues in Turkish costume, c. 1757

Many travellers had themselves painted by Liotard in exotic Eastern dress on their return, as did many who had never left Europe, including Madame de Pompadour.

He went to Vienna in 1742 to paint the portraits of the Imperial family. In 1745 his genre portrait The Chocolate Girl was acquired by the Venice-based art dealer Francesco Algarotti for the Dresden pastel cabinet.

Still under distinguished patronage he returned to Paris. In 1753 he visited England, where he painted Princess Augusta of Saxe-Gotha, the Princess of Wales. He travelled to the Dutch Republic in 1756, where, in the following year, he married Marie Fargues. She also came from a Huguenot family, and wanted him to shave off his beard.

In 1762 he painted portraits in Vienna, including Marie Antoinette; in 1770 in Paris. Another visit to England followed in 1772, and in the next two years his name figures among the Royal Academy exhibitors. He was an expert collector of paintings by the old masters. Many of the masterpieces he had acquired were sold by him at high prices on his second visit to England. He returned to his native town in 1776. In 1781 Liotard published his Traité des principes et des règles de la peinture. In final part of his career he painted still lifes and landscapes. He died in Geneva in 1789.

== Works ==
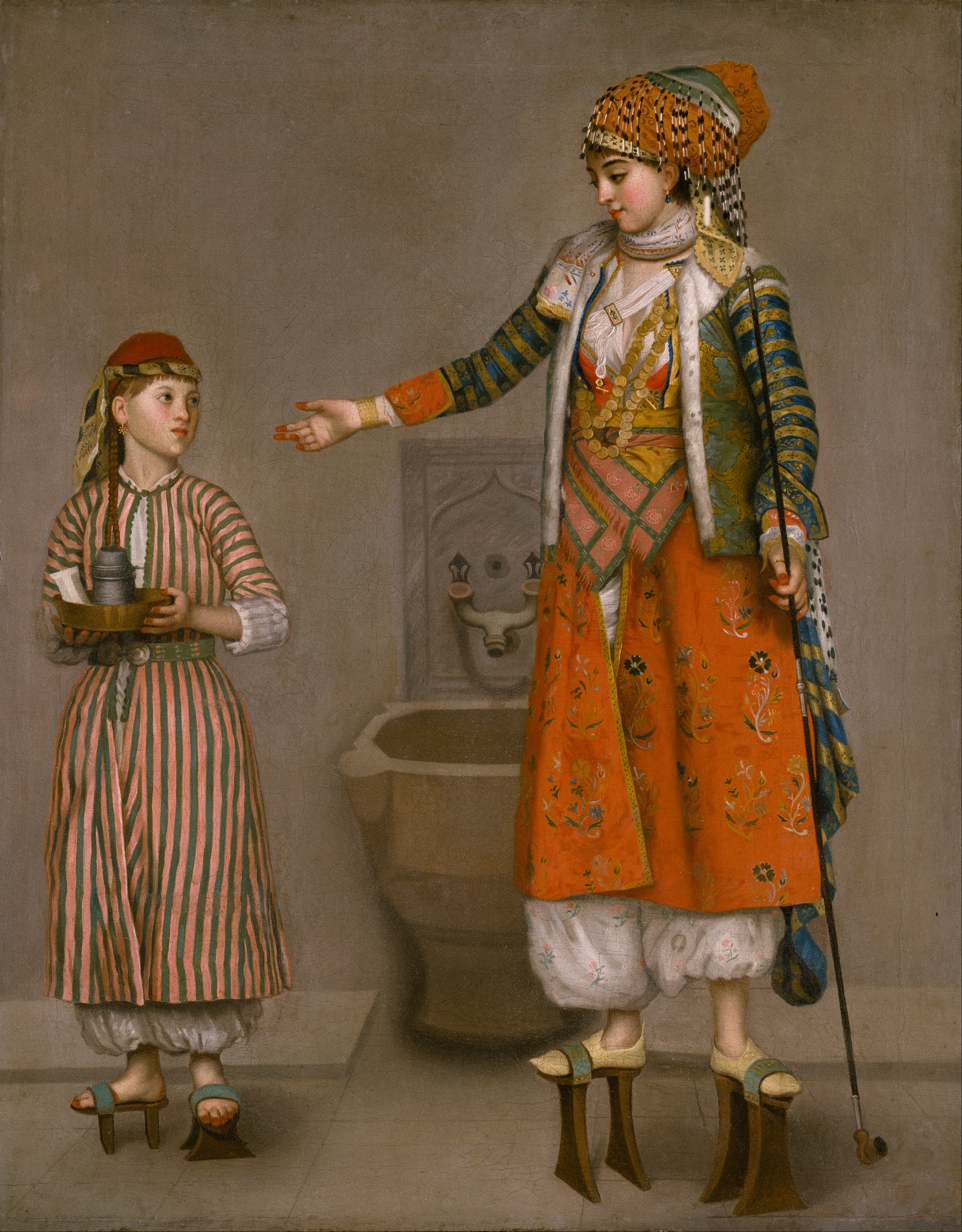
A Turkish Lady and her Servant, 1750, oil on canvas

Liotard was an artist of great versatility. His subjects stood out for their naturalistic appearance, in contrast to most portraiture of the era. Best known for his graceful and delicate pastel drawings, of which The Artist’s Niece, Marianne Lavergne, Known as ‘La Liseuse’ (Rijksmuseum), The Chocolate Girl, and the Beauty from Lyon (latter two at the Gemäldegalerie Alte Meister, Dresden) and Maria Frederike van Reede-Athlone at Seven (the J. Paul Getty Museum) are prime examples, he also achieved distinction for his enamels, copperplate engravings, and glass painting.

One outstanding feature of Liotard's paintings is the prevalence of smiling subjects. Generally, portrait subjects of the time adopted a more serious tone. This levity was a reflection of the Enlightenment-era philosophies that inspired Liotard. Also indicative of the era, Liotard created works celebrating science, like the painting of woman paying homage to the doctor that saved her.

== Pastel artist ==
=== Pastel works ===
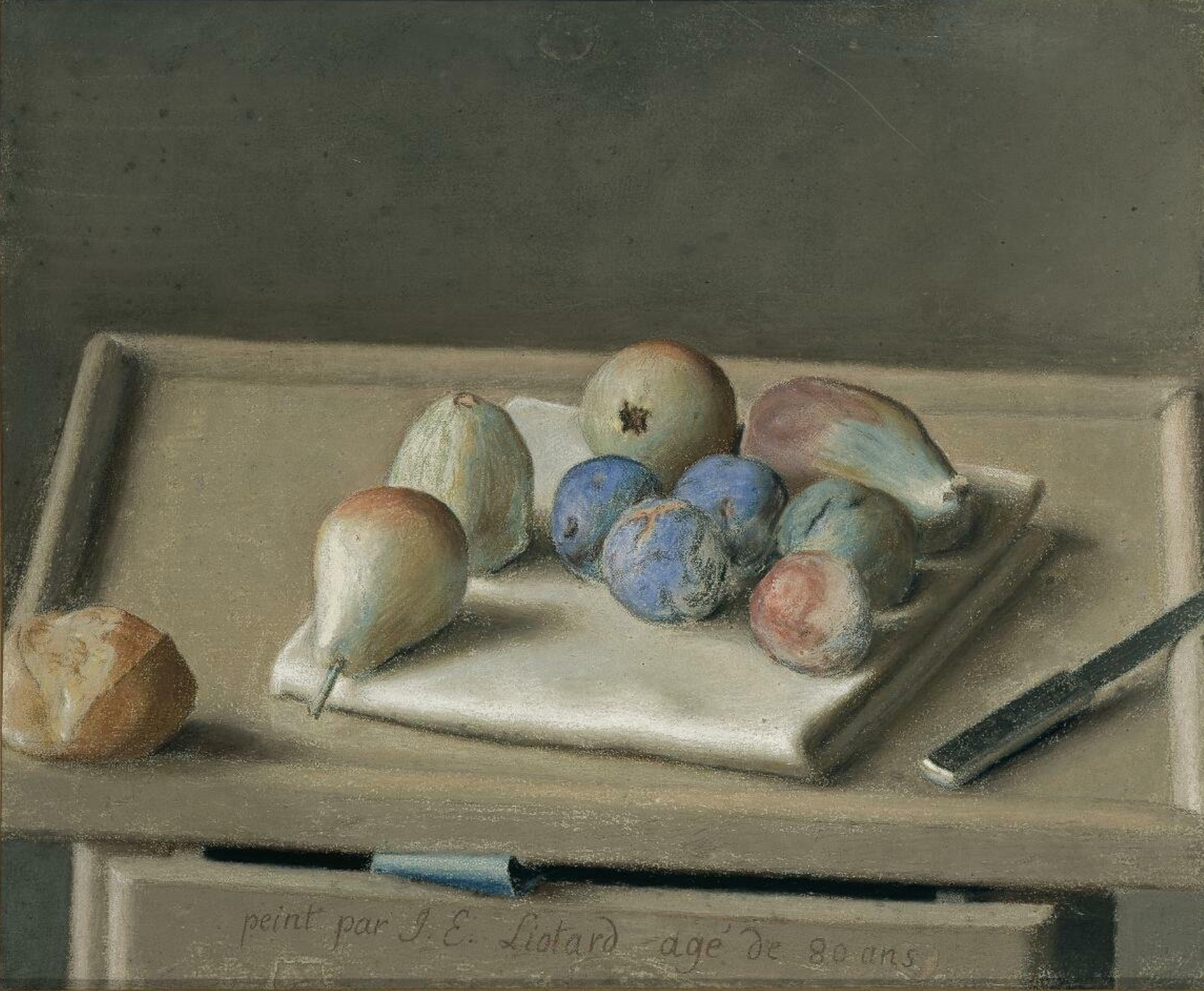
Still life of fruit on a napkin, with a bun and a knife, 1782, pastel

Liotard, also known as the ‘peintre de la verité’ (painter of the truth), chose the medium of pastel, in order to give his paintings a naturalistic effect. Liotard's Apollo and Daphne and The Three Graces might be his oldest pastel works that have been remained. While Liotard mainly worked with oil paint in Paris, one can say Liotard's career as a pastellist officially begun in Italy. Liotard had already become familiar with the medium of pastel during his younger years which he spent in his hometown Geneva, but it was not the medium he mainly worked in. The rejection by the Académie Royale de Peinture in Paris of his historical works in oil paint may have been a stimulus for him to go back to his beloved medium, in which he was notably more skilled.

=== Art theorist ===
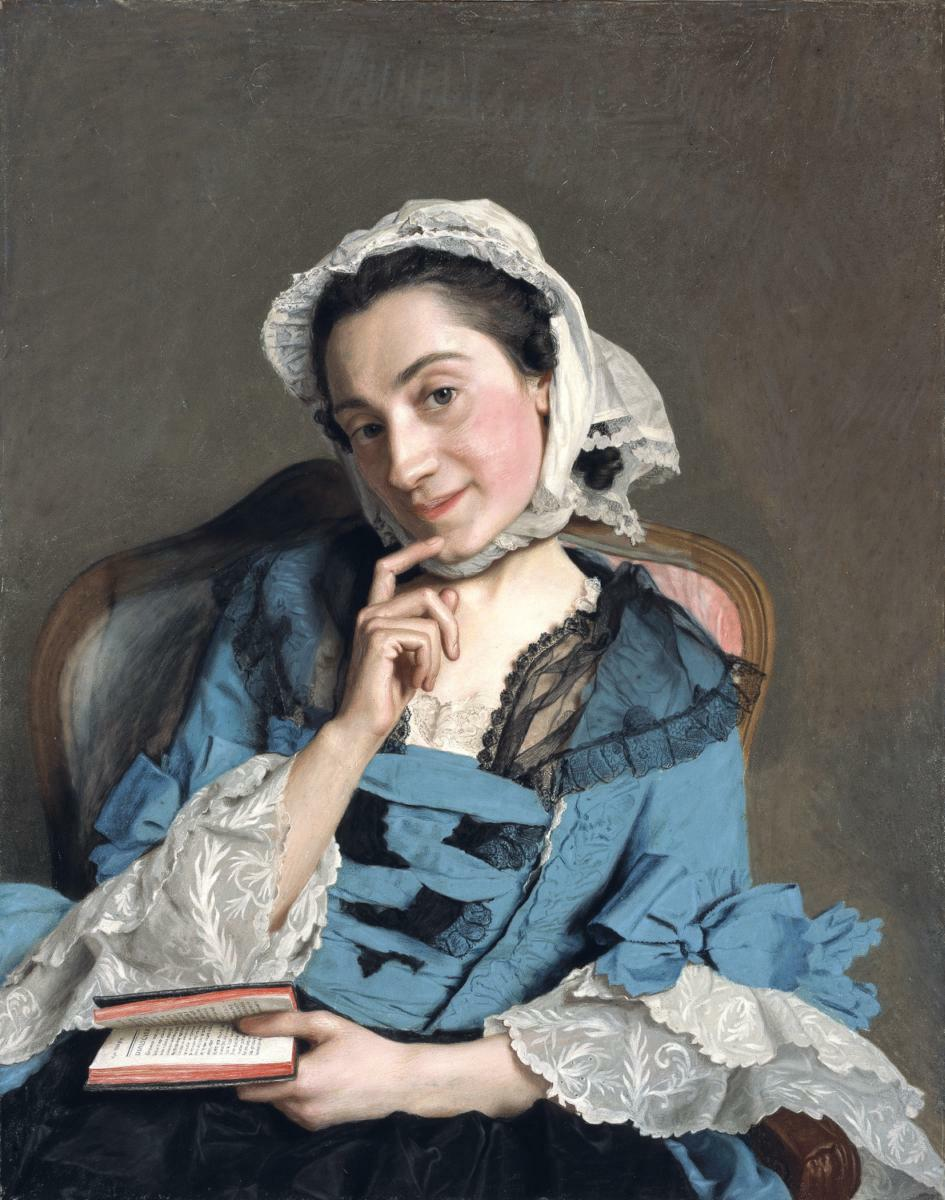
Portrait of Mrs. Denis-Joseph La Live d'Epinay, c. 1759

In the later part of his life he wrote the Traité des Principes et règles de la Peinture (Treatise on the Principles and Rules of Painting) (1681) in which he sets out his views on the art of painting. In his treatise Liotard mentions the importance of l’élimination des touches (elimination of the brushstrokes) in order to provide a realistic imitation of nature. He argued that this objective could be achieved more easily by the use of pastel instead of oil paint. It is thus unquestionable that Liotard chose the pastel medium because of its ability to imitate nature, which he found the most important aspect of painting. Not long before at a time when pastel as an artistic medium was at the peak of its popularity, Diderot had stated in his Dictionnaire Raisonné (1751) that pastel is the best medium for portraiture.

The proportions of pastel result in a particularly dry material that affords intense and vibrant colours, which Liotard valued working with. "For its beauty, vivacity, freshness and lightness of palette," Liotard wrote, "pastel painting is more beautiful than any other kind of painting." Liotard is known for pressing pastel quite forcefully onto the paper to create extra brilliance in order to exaggerate these qualities. This peculiar technique and desire for luminosity is what set him apart from other artists working with pastel and makes his works unique.

=== Support and fixatives for the pastel works ===
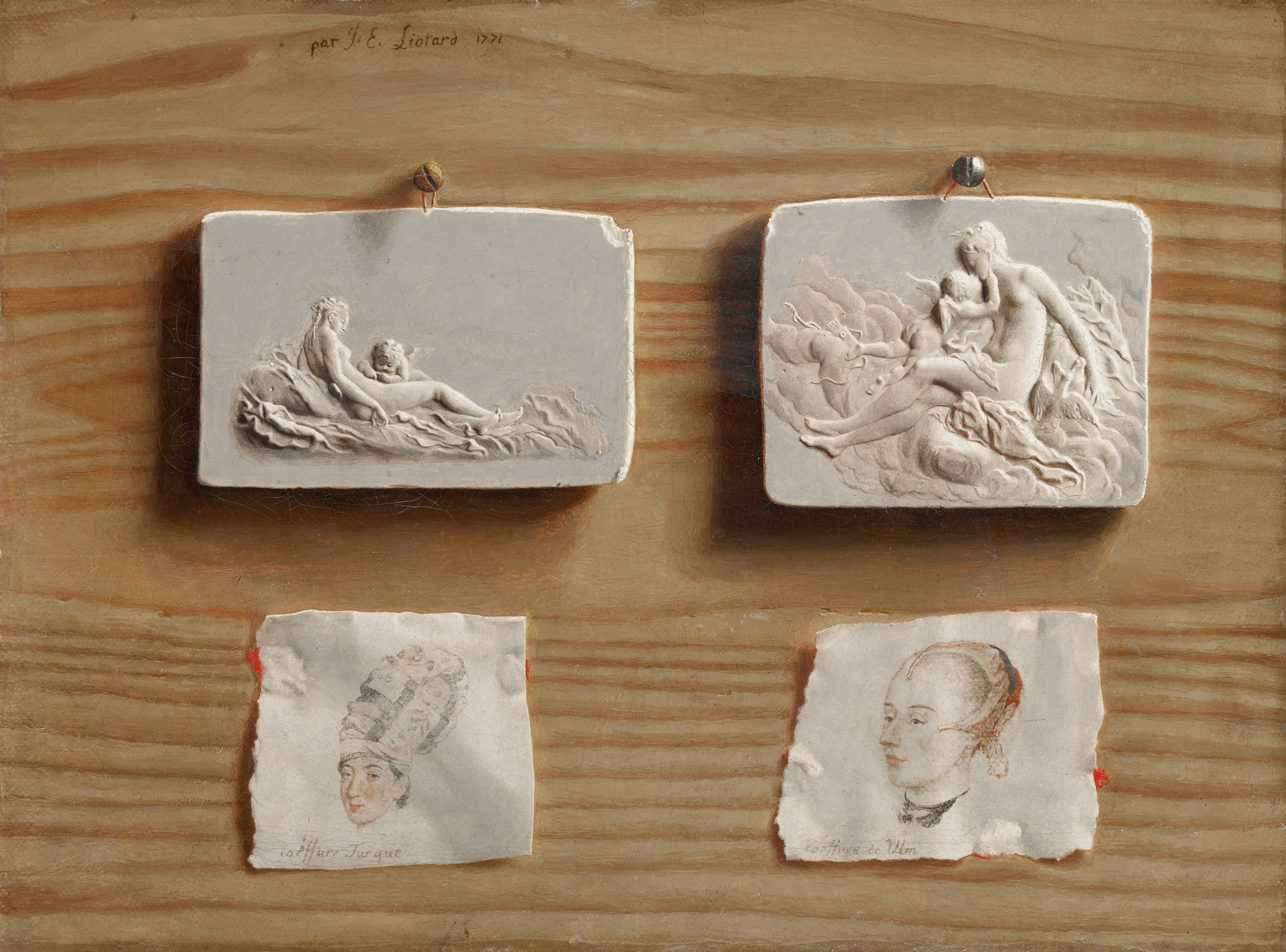
Trompe l'Oeil, 1771, oil on silk transferred to canvas

As a support for his pastel works, Liotard mostly used vellum, a surface made from the skin of calves, goats and lambs which optimally retains the brilliance of the pigment. He often prepared his support with fish glue and wine, mixed with fine pumice dust. In the eighteenth century pastel was often supported by coloured paper, especially blue thick paper was popular as it enhanced the brilliance of pastel. According to Gombaud and Sauvage, Liotard also often used blue paper when working on a paper support.

The vast majority of pastels that survive from the eighteenth century were not fixed. The powdery pigment is applied dry, which makes it quite brittle. This allows the pigment to easily detach from its surface, but also makes it more sensitive to moisture and stains. This factor complicates the conservation of pastel works.

== Collections ==
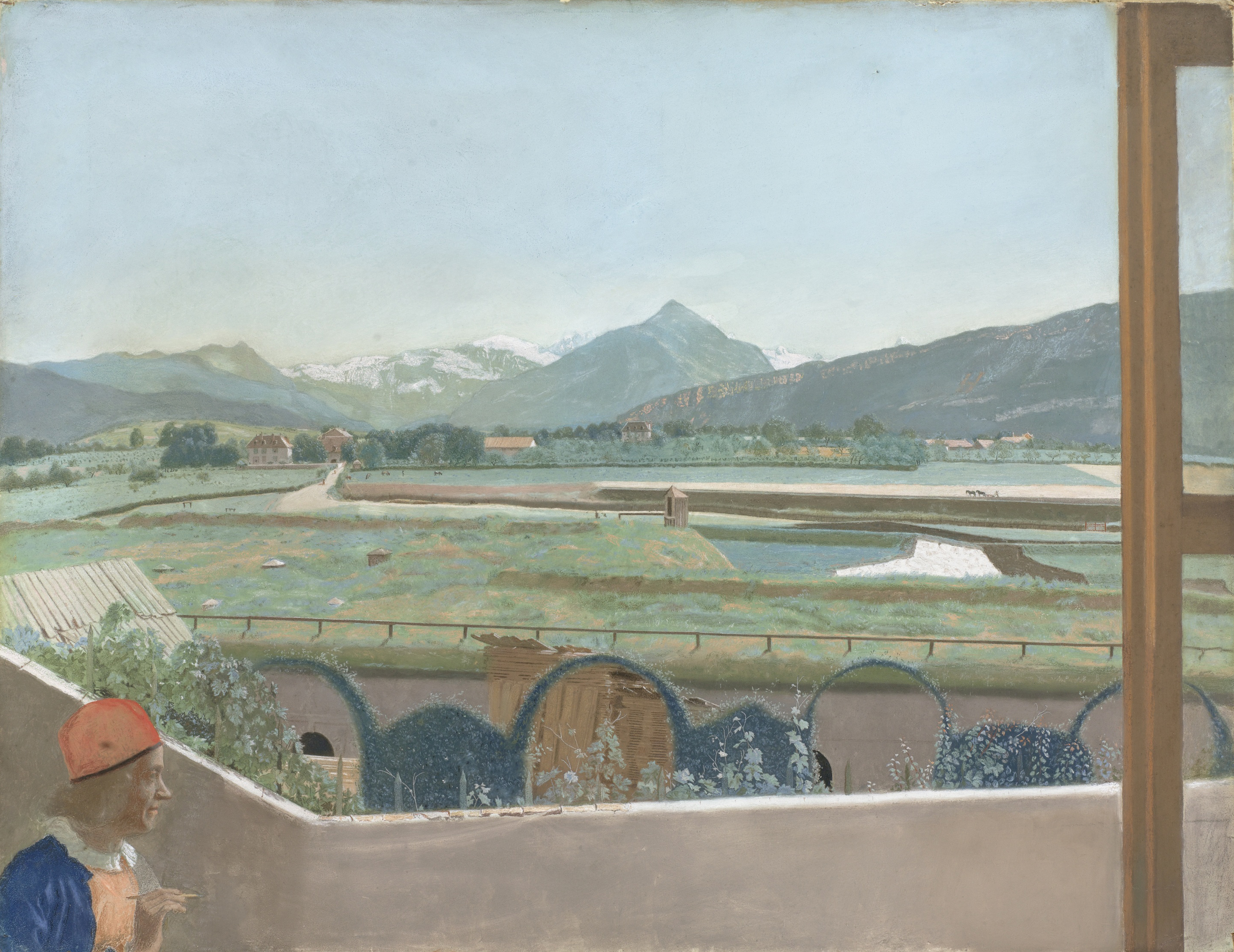
View of the Mont Blanc with a self-portrait, 1750, Rijksmuseum

The Rijksmuseum in Amsterdam inherited an important collection of his drawings and paintings due to his family connections with the Dutch Republic through his wife and son. The Museum of Fine Arts Bern and the Musée d'Art et d'Histoire in Geneva have important examples of his paintings and pastel drawings. A picture of a Turk seated is at the Victoria and Albert Museum, while the British Museum owns some of his drawings. The Louvre has, besides twenty-two drawings, a portrait of Lieutenant General Hérault as well as an oil painting of an English merchant and a friend dressed in costumes and entitled Monsieur Levett and Mademoiselle Helene Glavany in Turkish Costumes. A portrait of the artist is on view at the Sala di pittori, in the Uffizi Gallery, Florence.

== Selected works ==
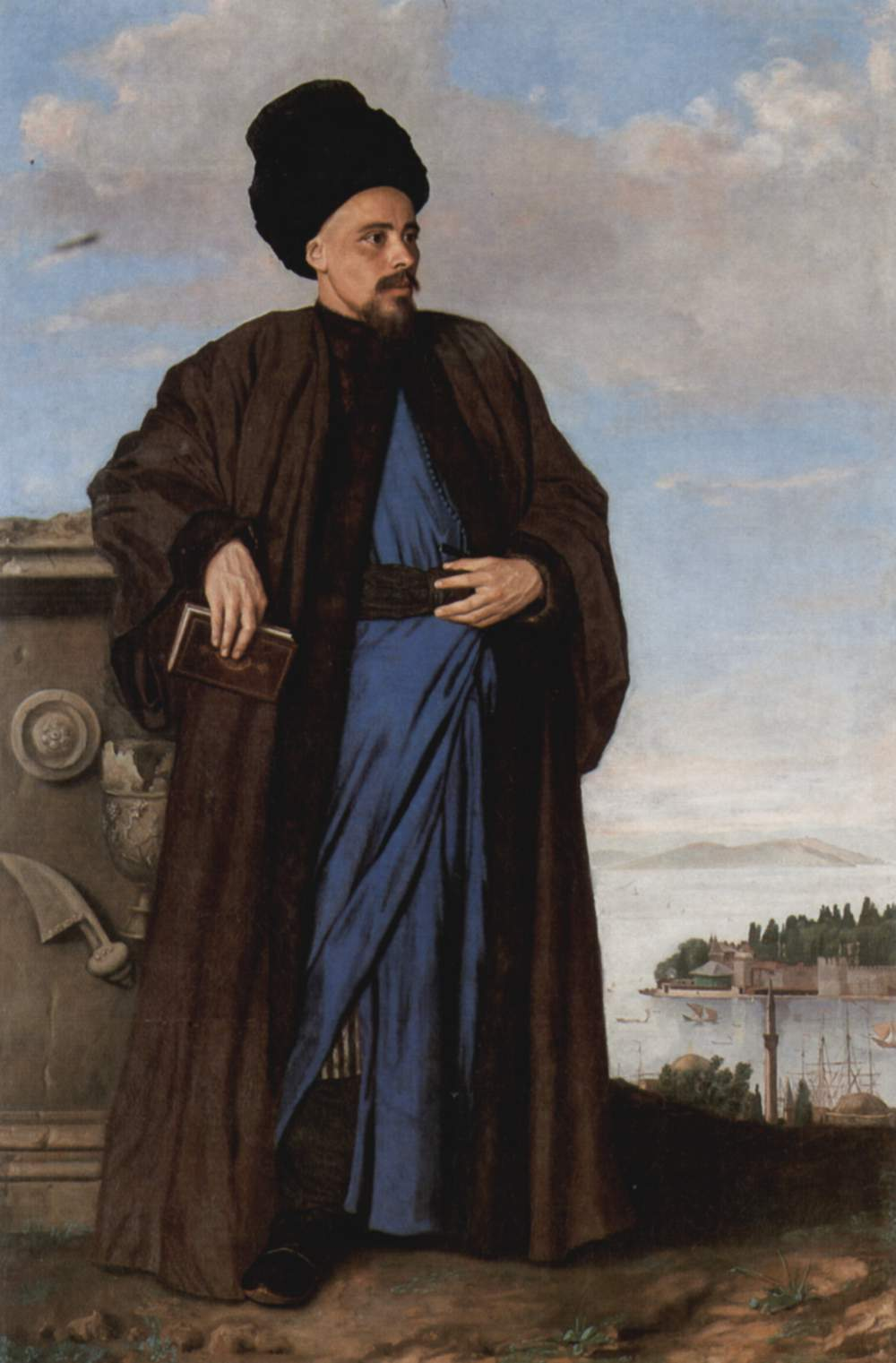
Richard Pococke, 1738–39, oil on canvas

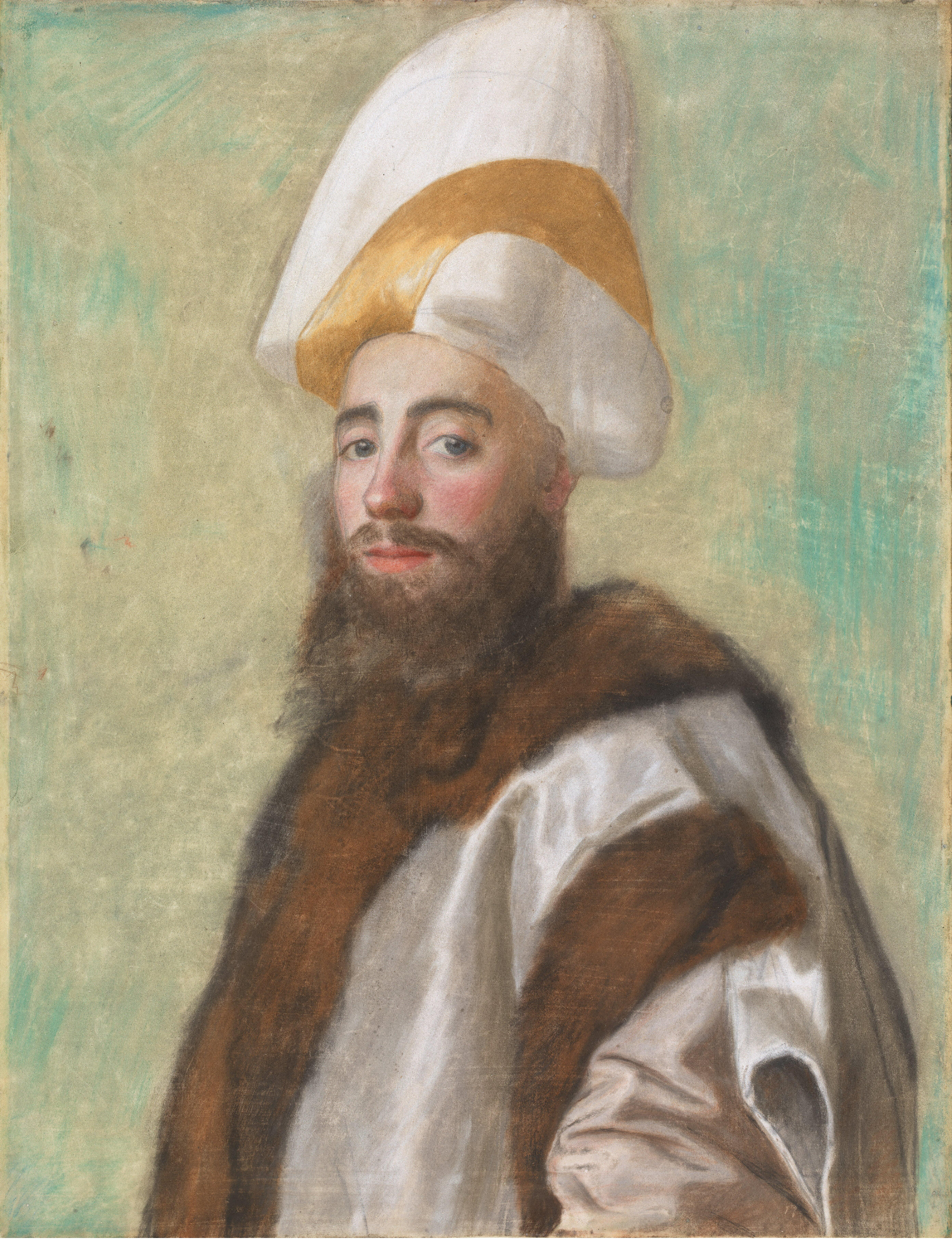
Portrait of a Turkish grand vizier, probably Hekimoğlu Ali Pasha, c. 1738–1743, pastel on paper

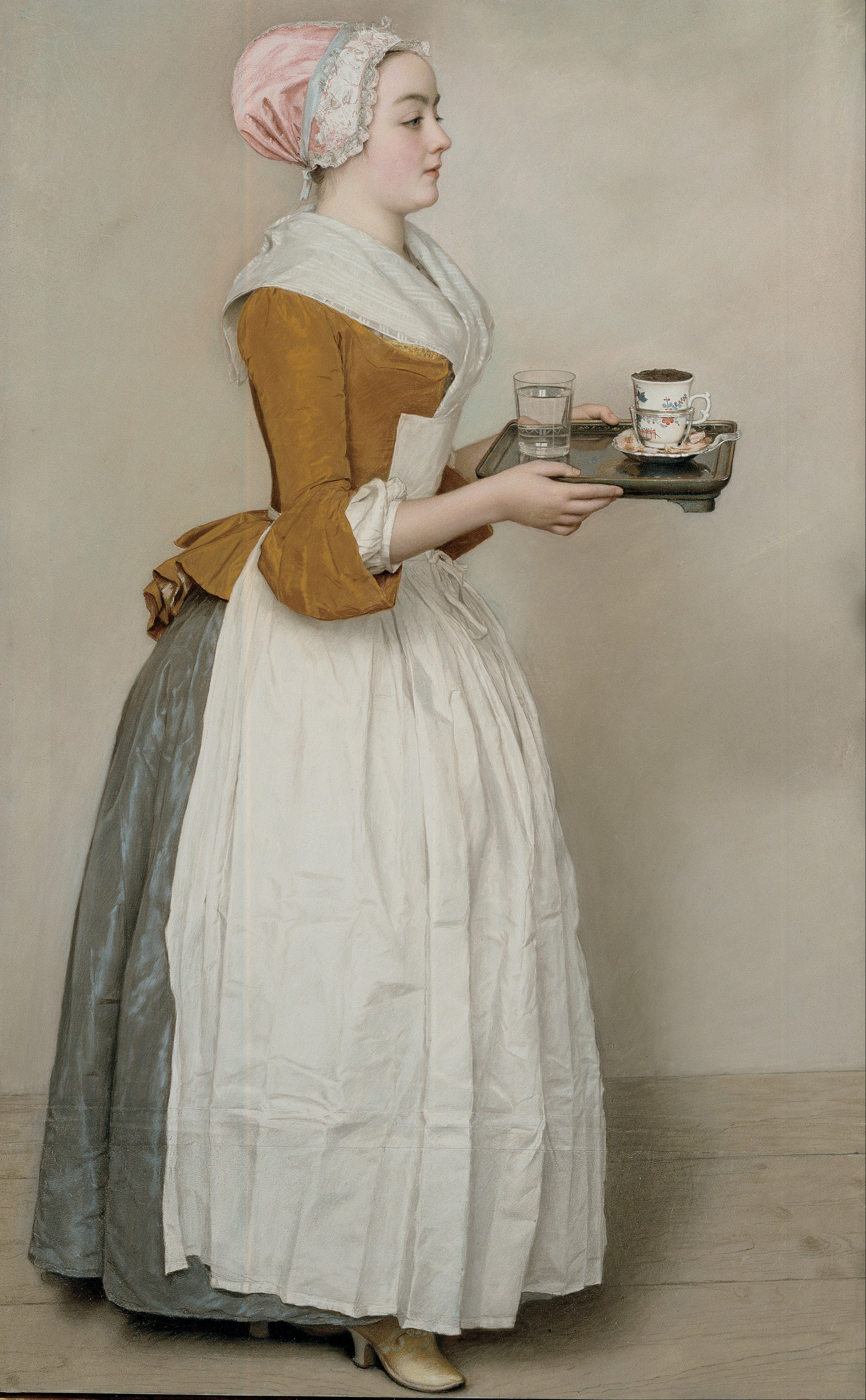
The Chocolate Girl, 1743–1744

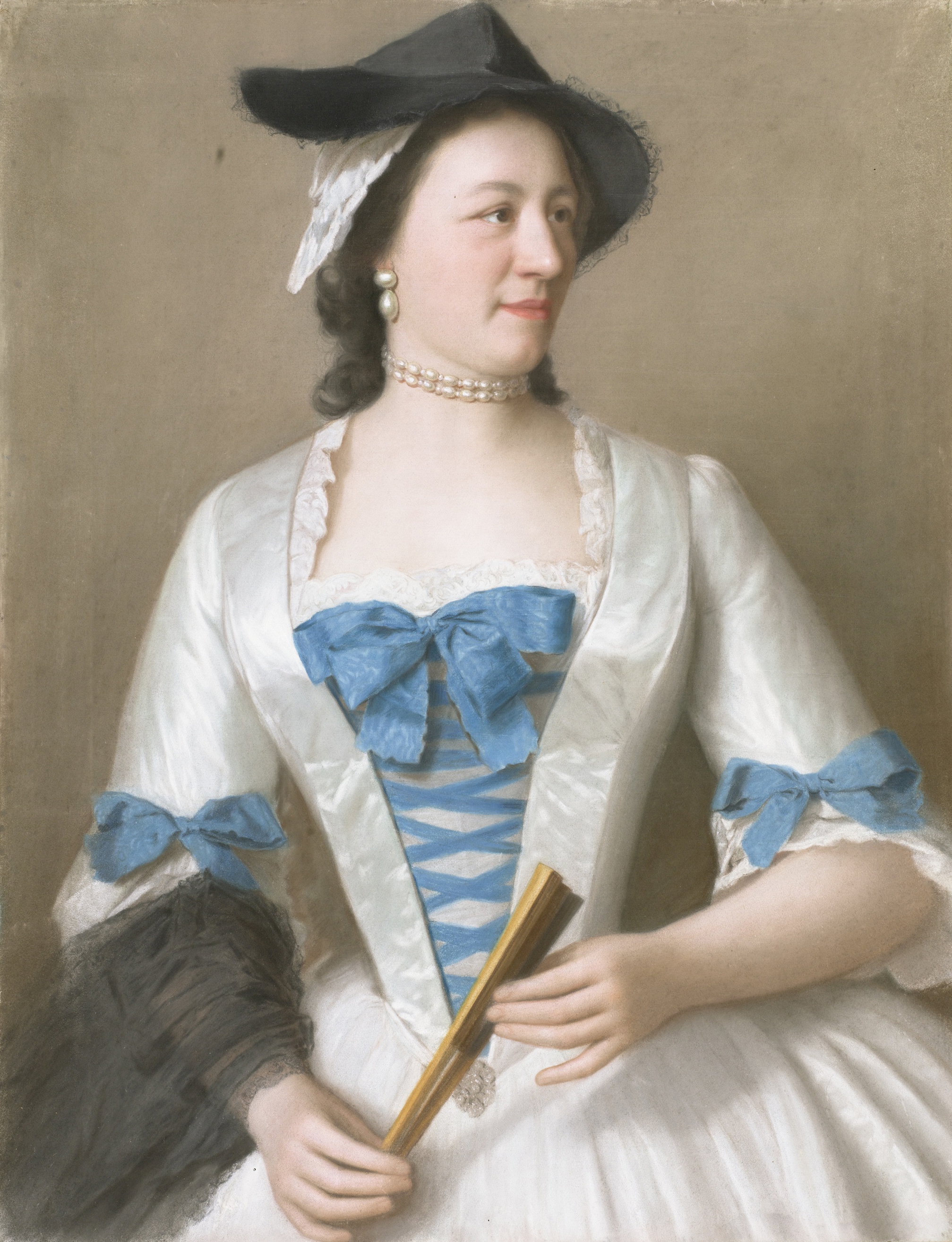
Jeanne-Elisabeth de Sellon, c. 1746, pastel on parchment

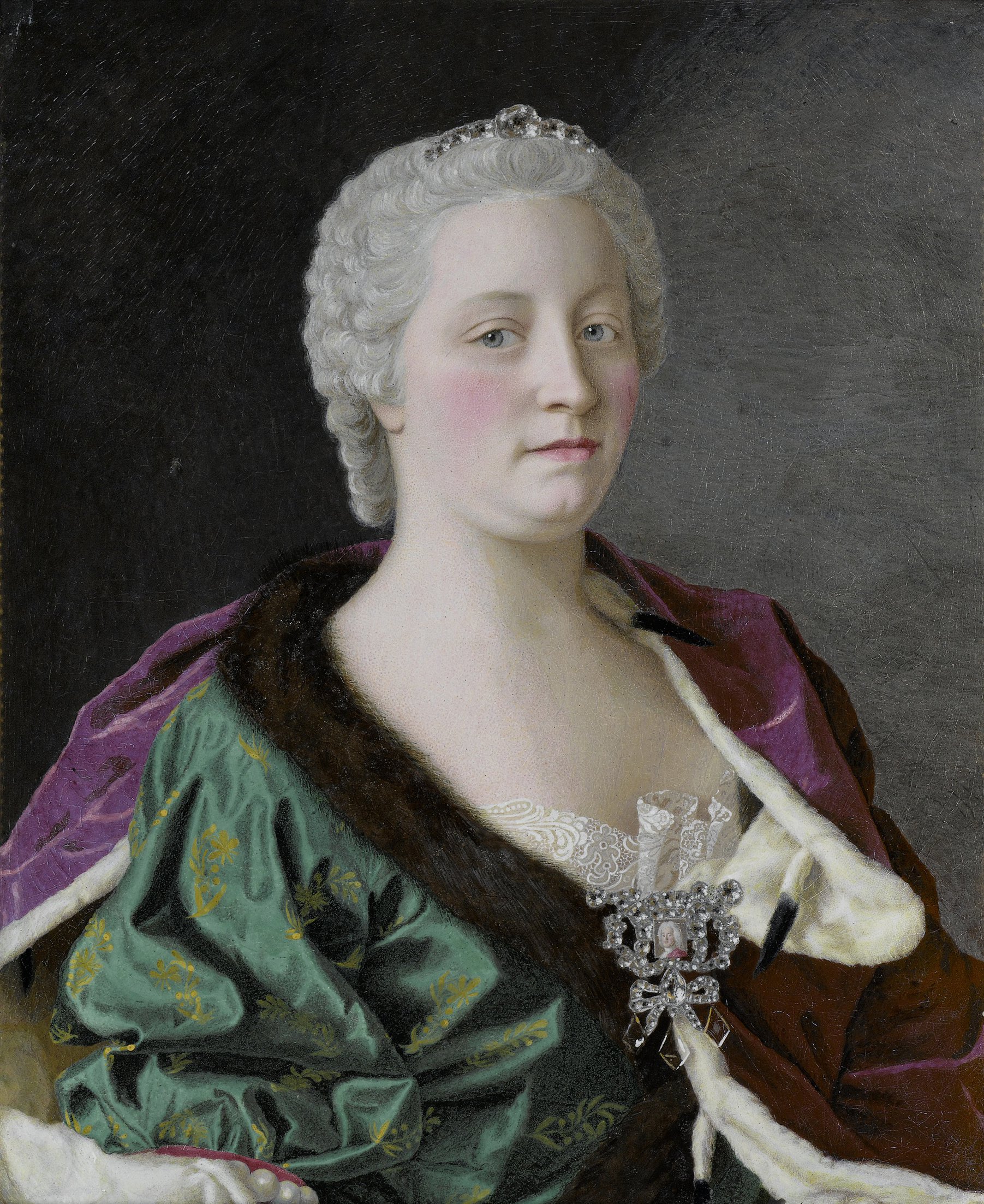
Empress Maria Theresia, 1747, enamel on copper

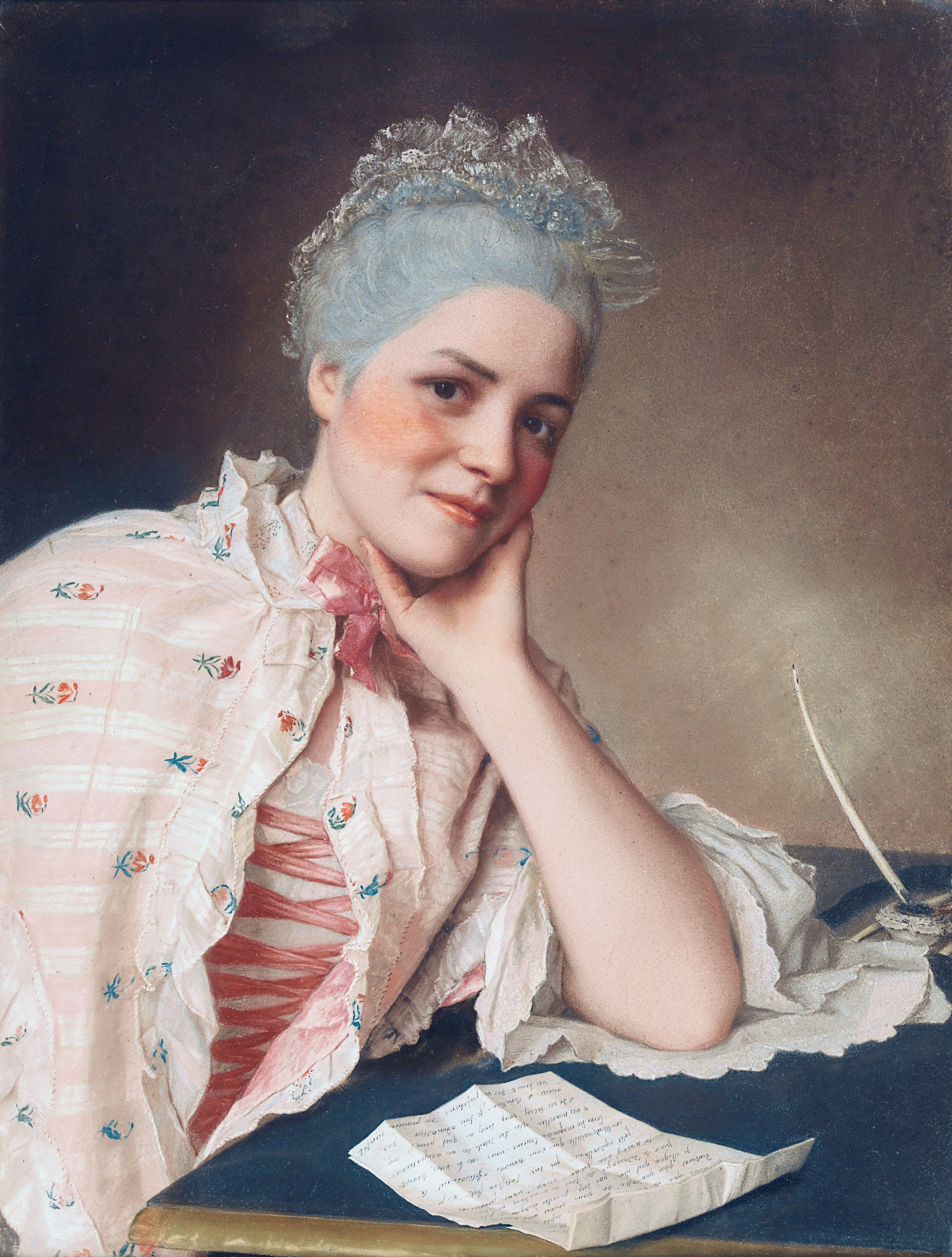
Portrait of Mademoiselle Jacquet, c. 1748–1752, pastel on paper

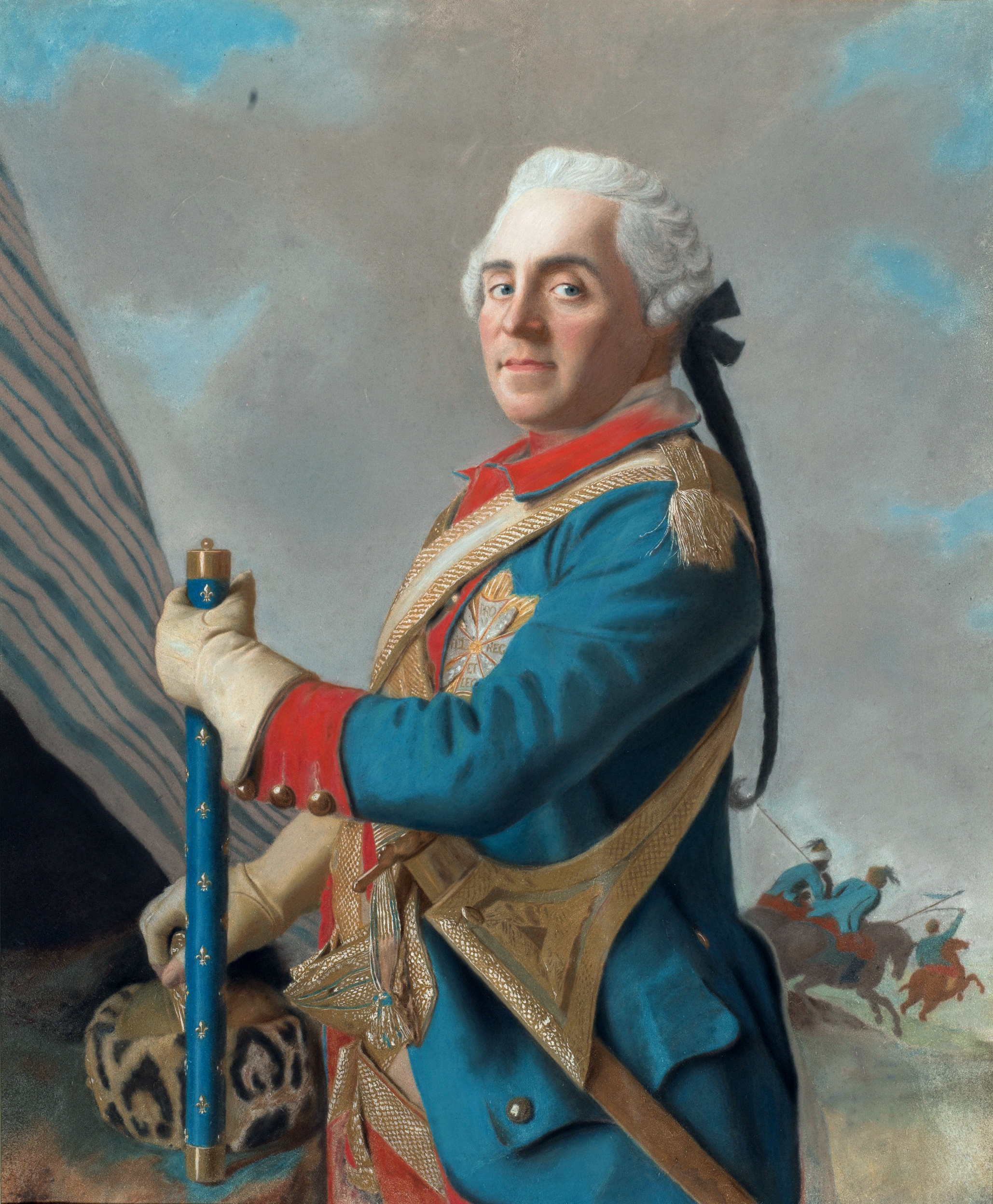
Portrait of Maurice de Saxe, 1748, pastel on parchment

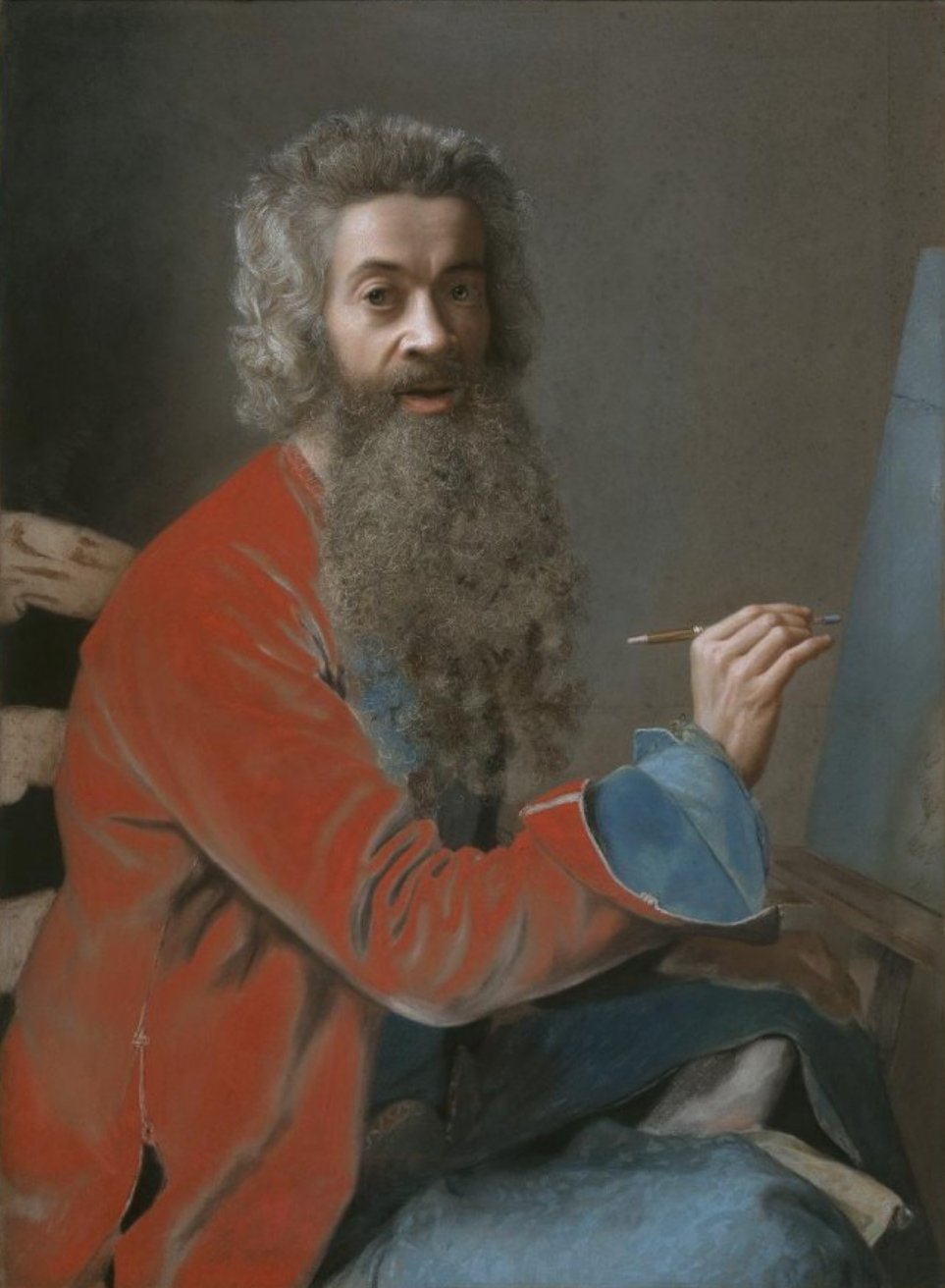
Self-portrait, c. 1749, pastel

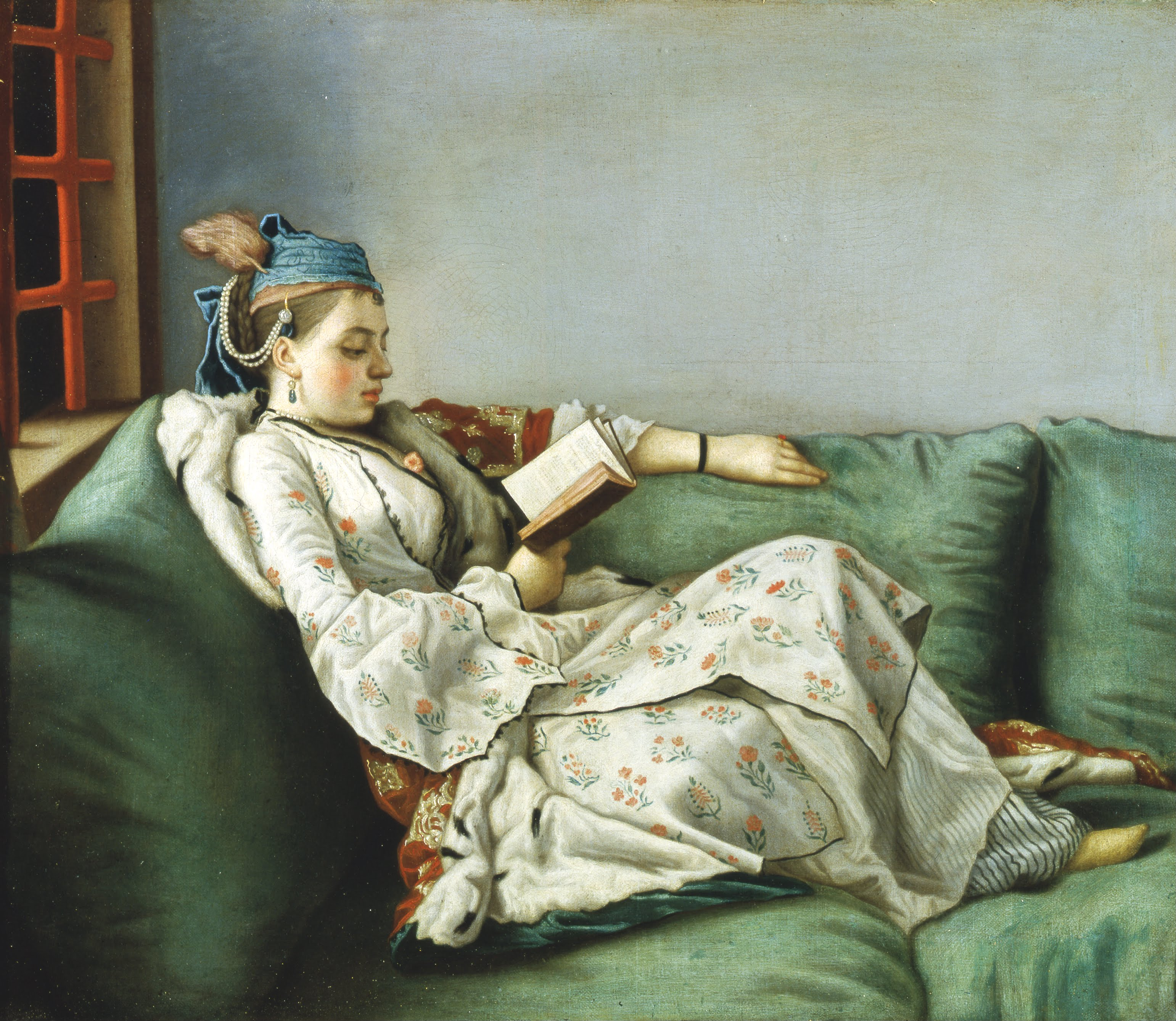
Marie Adélaïde of France in Turkish Dress, 1753, oil on canvas

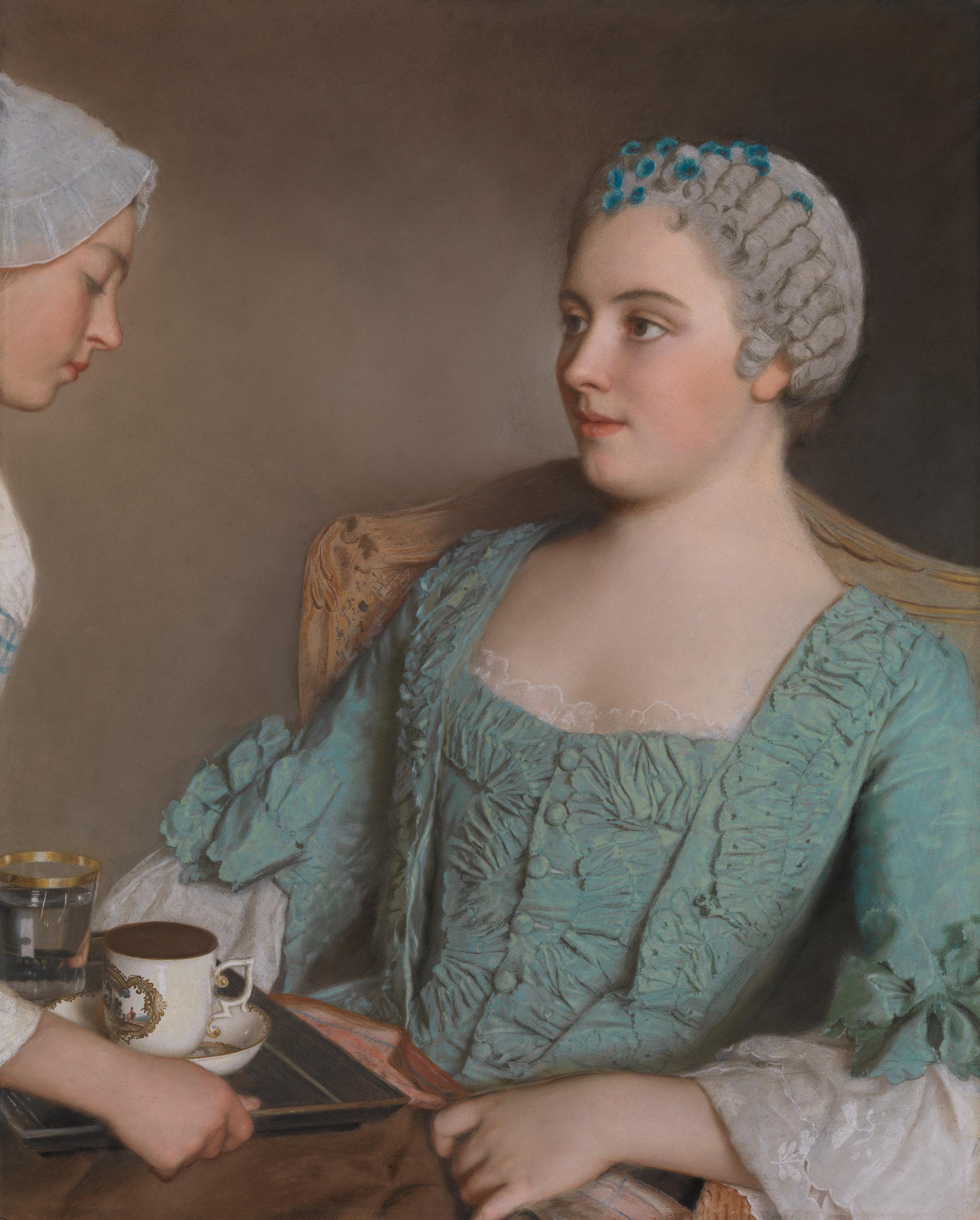
The breakfast, 1754, pastel on vellum

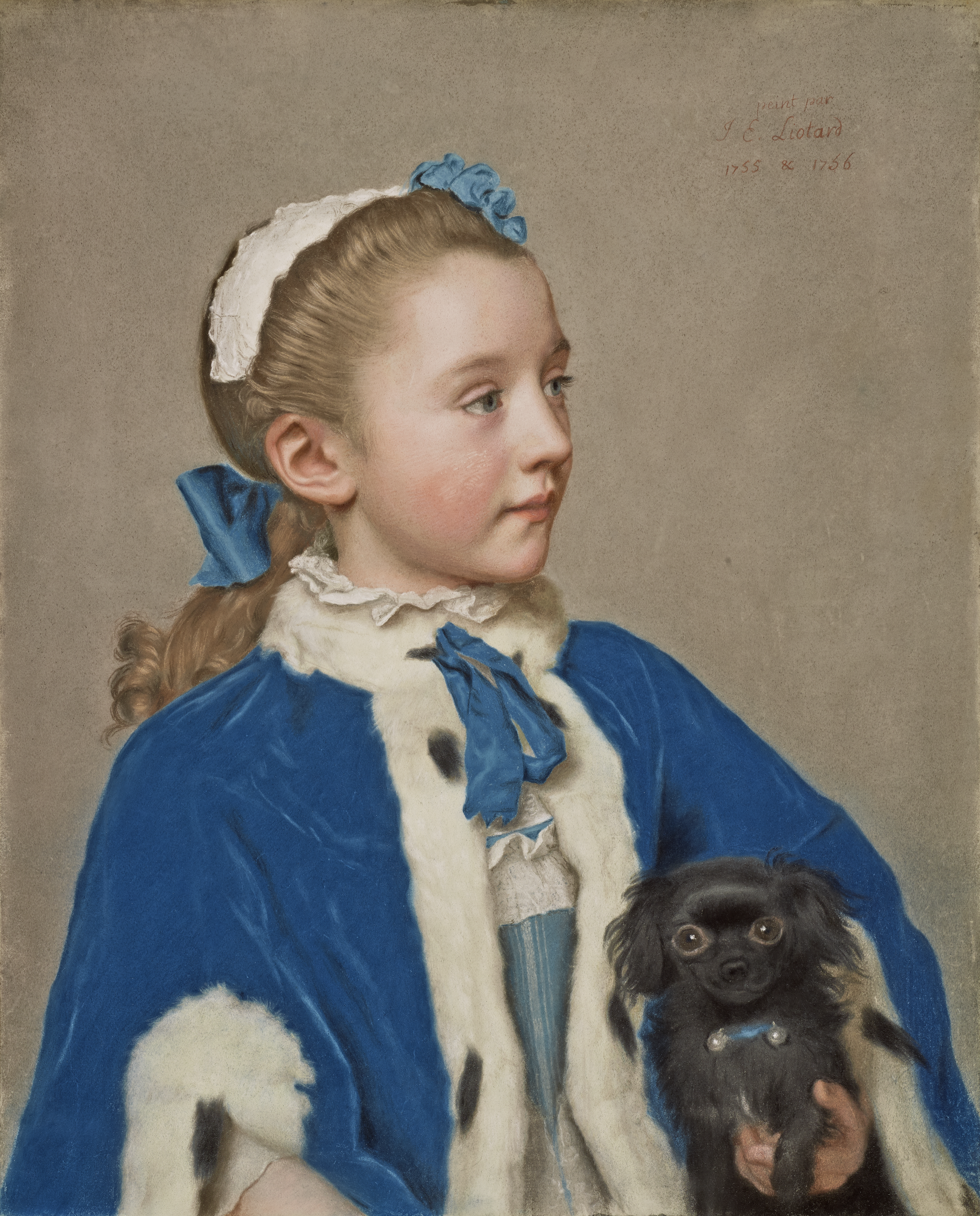
Maria Frederike van Reede-Athlone, 1755–56, pastel on vellum

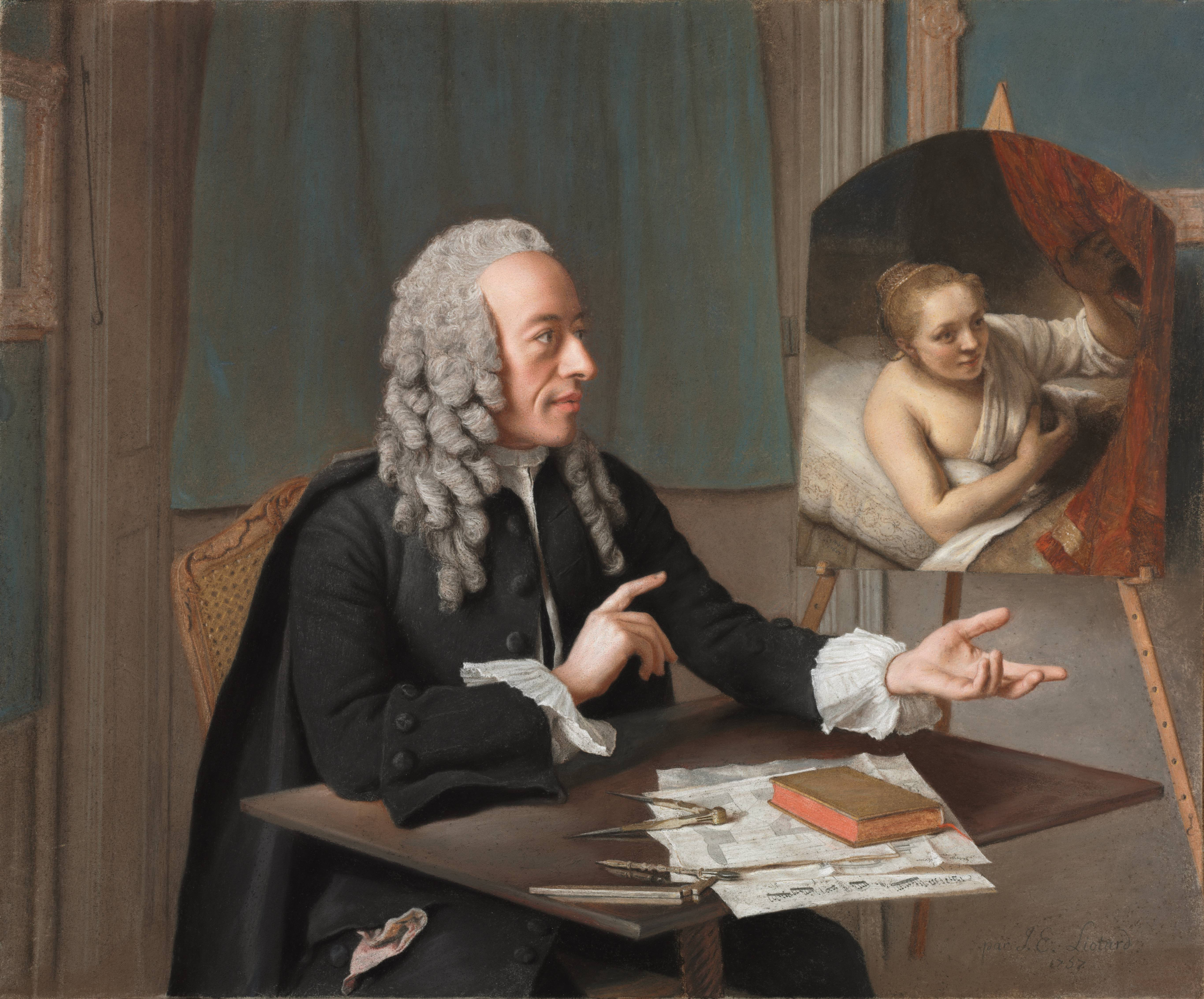
Portrait of dr François Tronchin, 1757, pastel on parchment. Tronchin is looking at Rembrandt's Woman in Bed

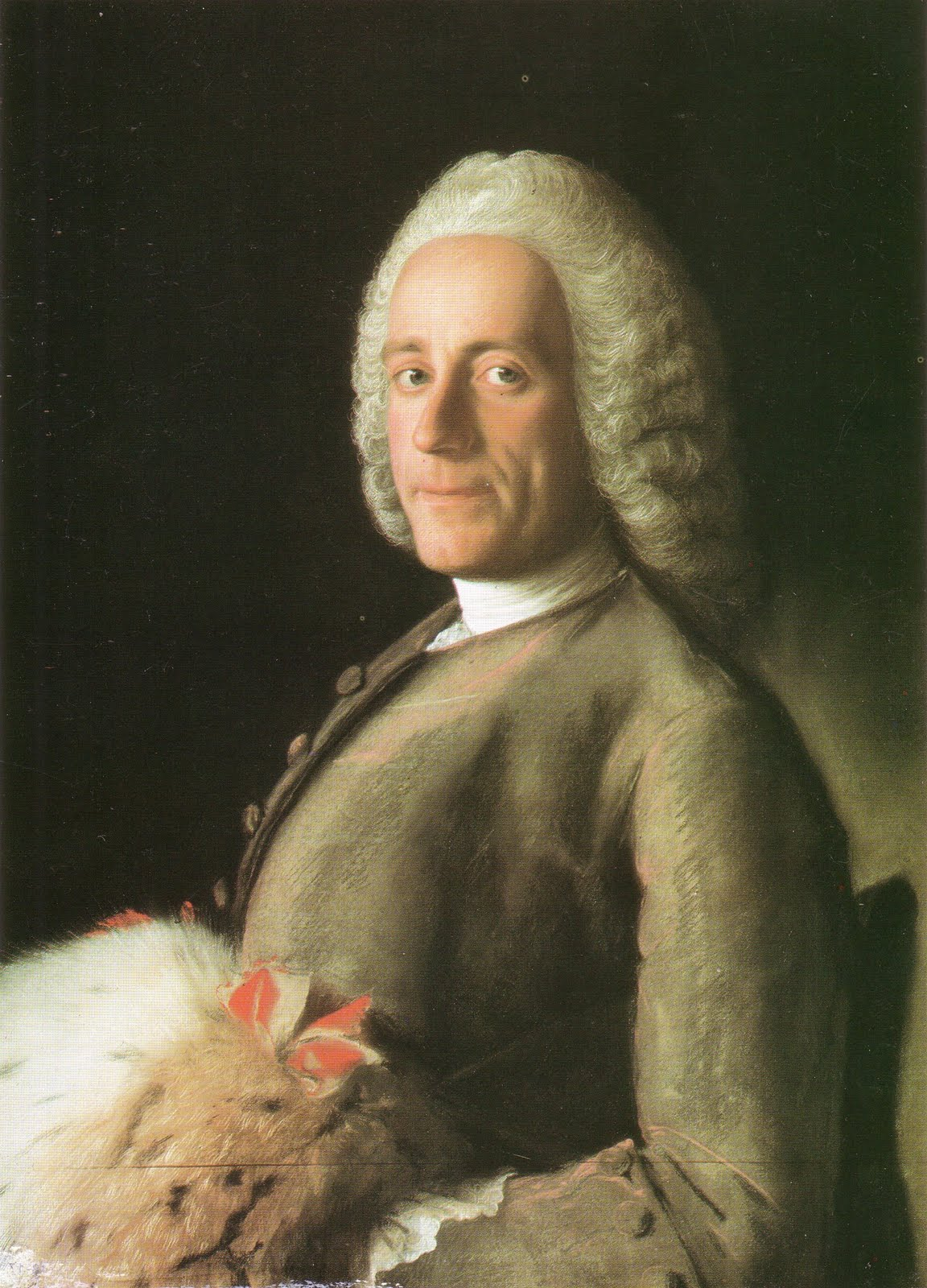
Ami-Jean de la Rive, c. 1758, pastel on paper

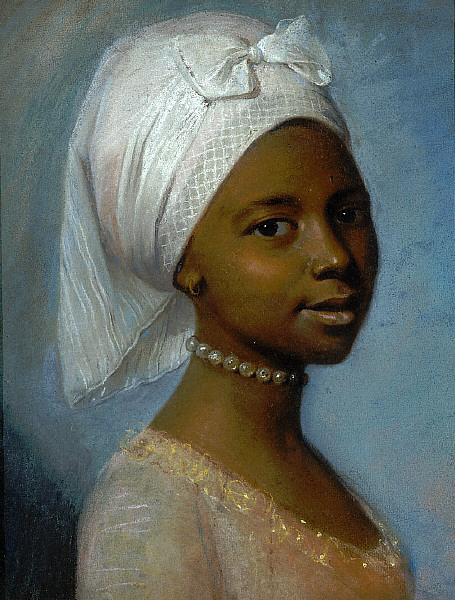
Portrait of a Young Woman, pastel

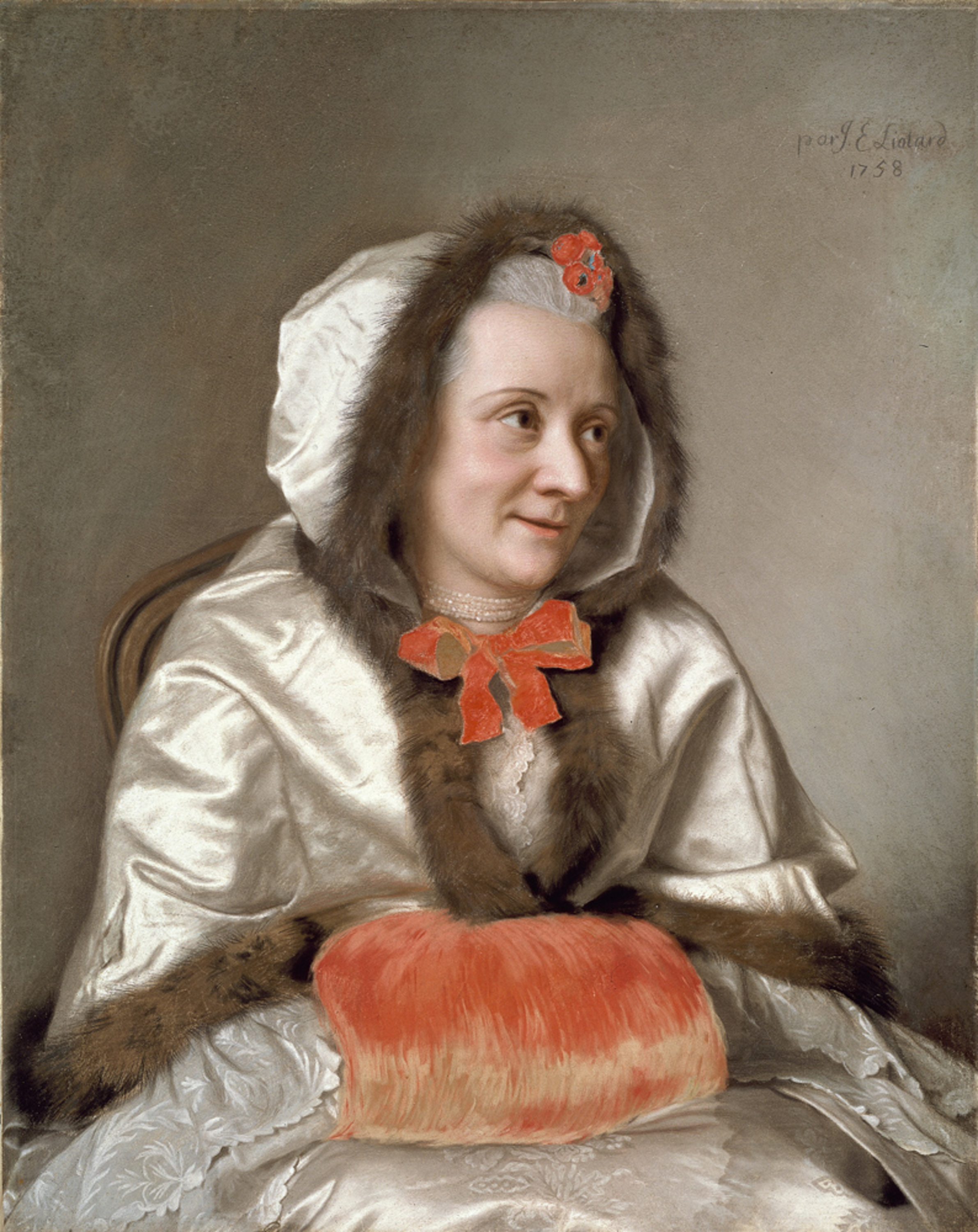
Portrait of Mrs. François Tronchin (née Anne-Marie Fromaget), 1758

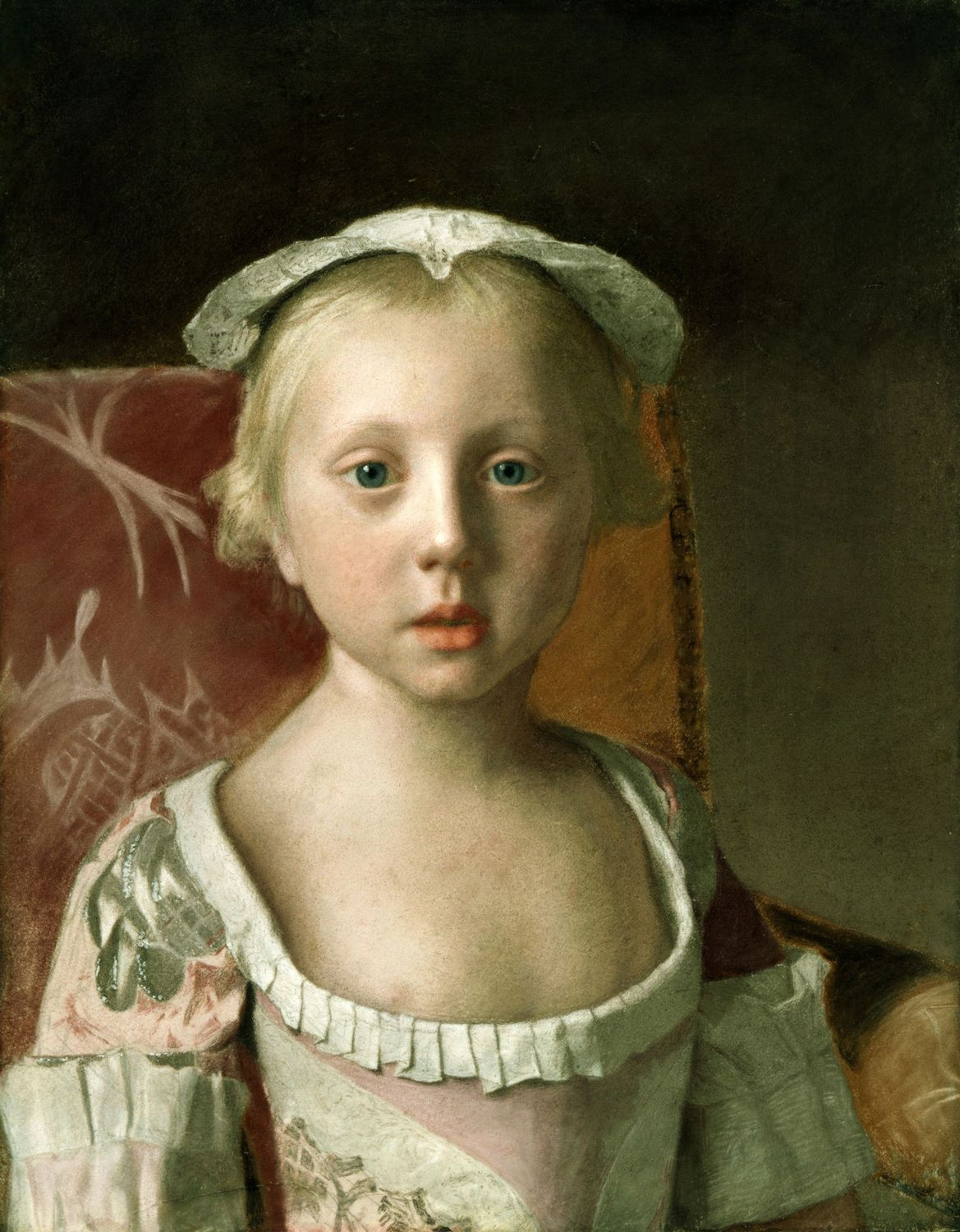
Portrait of Princess Louisa of Great Britain, 1754

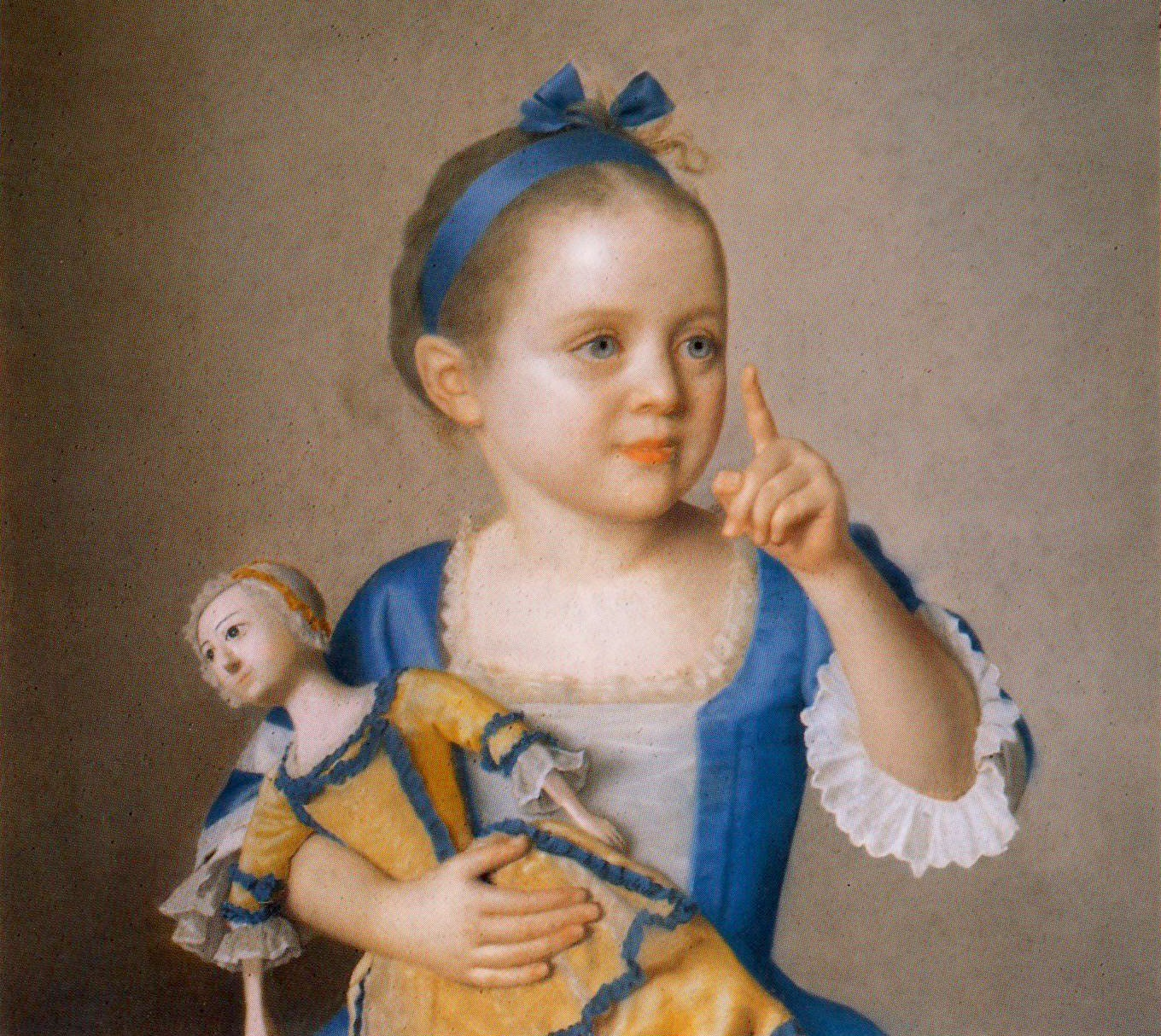
Marianne Liotard Holding a Doll, 1765

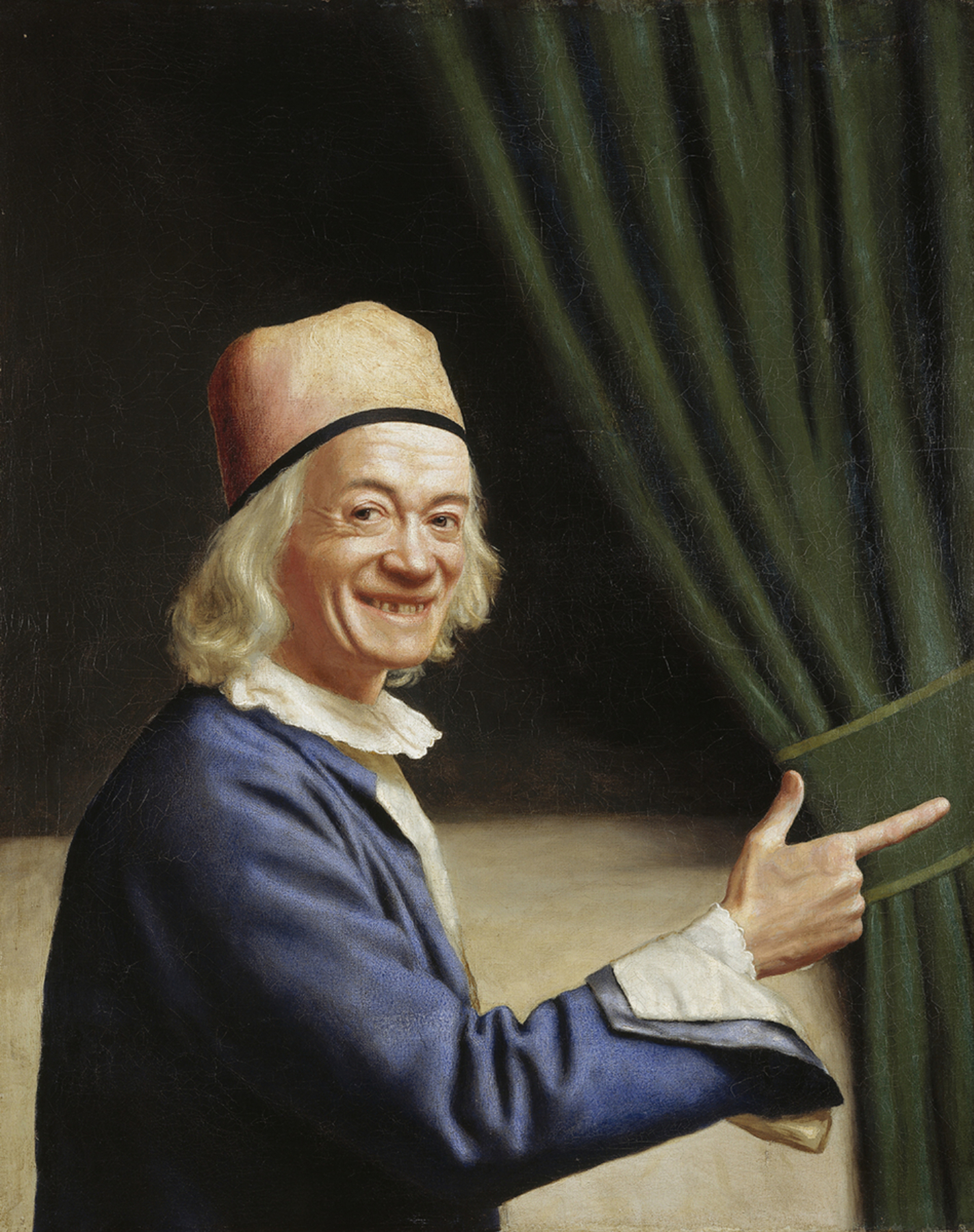
Self-portrait of Liotard laughing, c. 1770, oil on canvas

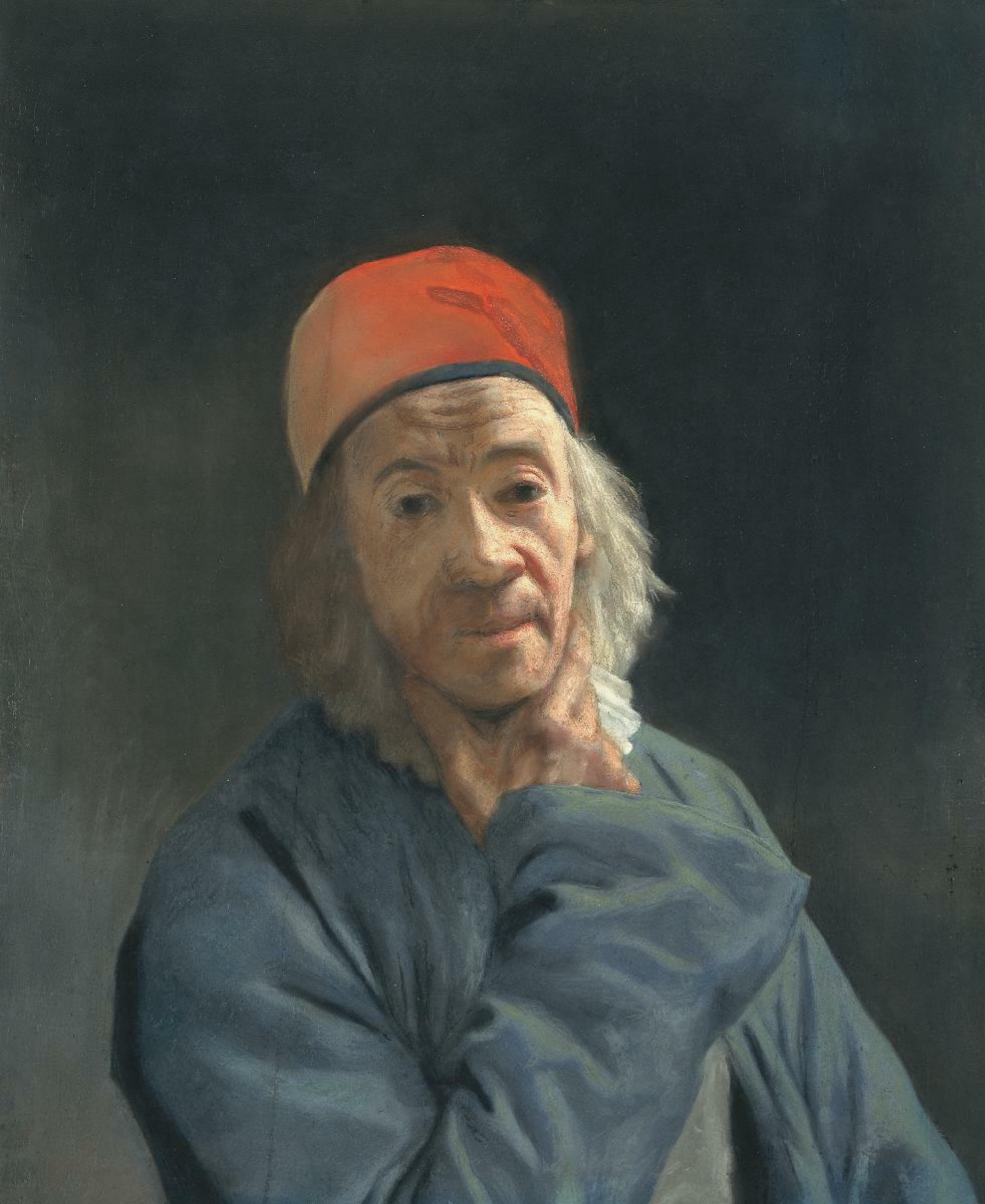
Self-portrait, known as "the hand on the chin", c. 1770

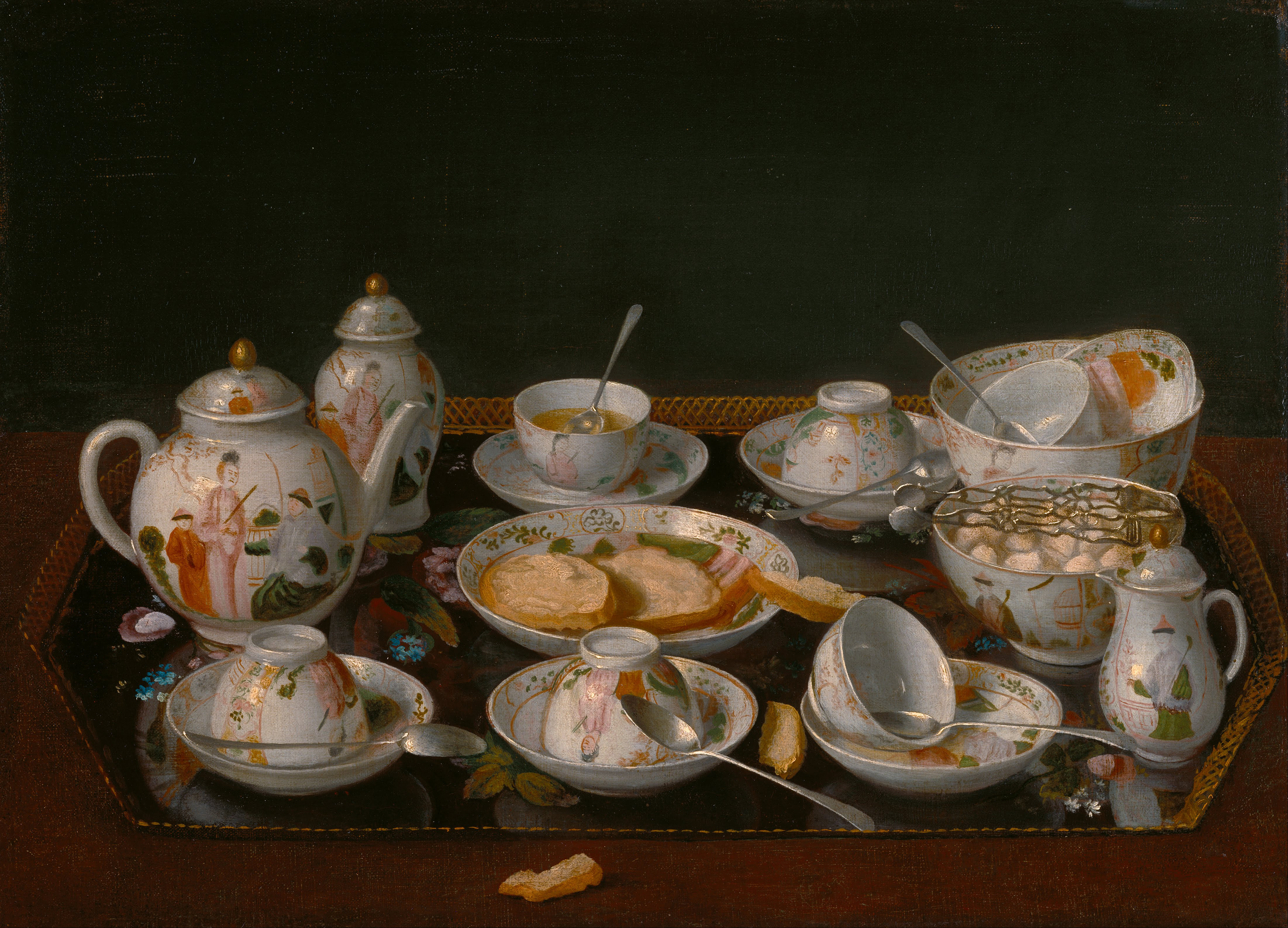
Still Life, Tea Set, c. 1781–83, oil on canvas
