= Jean Moreau de Séchelles =

French official and politician (1690–1761)

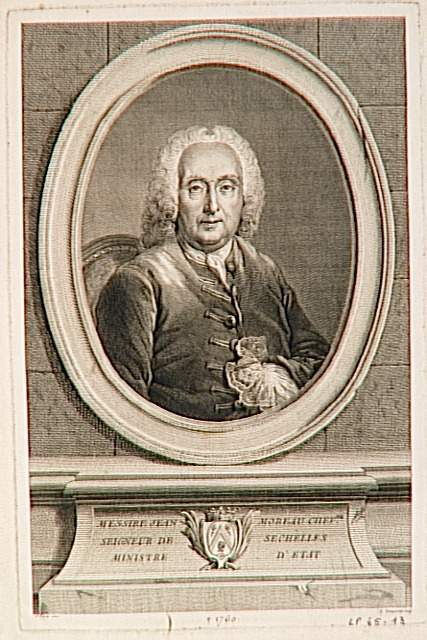
Jean Moreau, sieur de Séchelles

Jean Moreau de Séchelles (French: [mɔʁo də seʃɛl]; 10 May 1690 – 31 December 1760) was a French official and politician. The Seychelles Islands were named in his honor.

== Biography ==
Made a maître des requêtes on 13 October 1719, he was the intendant of Hainaut in Valenciennes from 1727 to 1743. He was the intendant of Lille from 1743 to 1754, while simultaneously the intendant of Flanders from May 1745 until 18 October 1748 during its French occupation.

He was named the controller-general of finances, replacing Jean-Baptiste de Machault d'Arnouville on 20 July 1754. He served this function until 24 April 1756. He pursued a daring economic policy, bordering liberalism, while trying to straighten out the royal finances. Having the king's confidence as the minister of state in 1755, he was consulted about the reversal of alliances from Prussia to Austria. After suffering a stroke in March 1756, his son-in-law François Marie Peyrenc de Moras was designated by Louis XV to replace him.

He was made an honorary member of the French Academy of Sciences on 14 July 1755, its vice-president in 1756, and its president in 1757.

In 1710, he bought the land of Cuvilly in Oise, which had belonged to the lords of Séchelles. There he constructed a modern château in place of the feudal castle. He was consequently called "Moreau de Séchelles."

The Seychelles islands, ceded to the French East India Company in 1756, were named in his honor.

His daughter Marie Hélène Moreau de Séchelles (1715-1798) married René Hérault, the lieutenant general of police of Paris. From this marriage came Jean-Baptiste Martin Hérault de Séchelles, childhood friend of Louis-Antoine de Bougainville and father of the politician Marie-Jean Hérault de Séchelles.
