= Nicolas Ravot d'Ombreval =

Nicolas Jean-Baptiste Ravot, seigneur d'Ombreval (28 September 1680 – 18 October 1729) was a French magistrate and administrator who served as Lieutenant General of Police of Paris from 1724 to 1725.

== Biography ==
Born in Paris, he was the son of Jean-Baptiste Ravot d'Ombreval, a member of the parlement of Paris, and of Geneviève Berthelot, from the wealthy and influential Berthelot family of financiers (see Jeanne Agnès Berthelot de Pléneuf, marquise de Prie, who was the niece of Geneviève Berthelot).

Nicolas Ravot d'Ombreval was Advocate General at the cour des aides of Paris, the appeal court for disputes arising out of the collection of taxes within the jurisdiction of the parlement of Paris, which covered half of France's territory. Nicolas Ravot d'Ombreval was also maître des requêtes. On 28 January 1724, he was appointed Lieutenant General of Police of Paris, i.e. head of the Paris Police.

While Lieutenant General of Police, he was responsible for the royal edict of 24 September 1724 which created the Paris Bourse. He also revived the old decrees of the provost of Paris (the medieval representative of the King in the city of Paris) against prostitution. He was the first one to regulate fiacre services (horse-drawn for-hire carriages known as hackney carriages in England) with his order of 24 May 1725.

He left the Lieutenancy General of Police of Paris on 28 August 1725 and was appointed intendant of the généralité of Tours, succeeding René Hérault, who succeeded him as Lieutenant General of Police of Paris. He was dismissed from his office of intendant on 11 August 1726.

Nicolas Ravot d'Ombreval was married to Thérèse Gabrielle Bréau (1678-1769). He died in 1729 at the age of 49 and was buried in the church of Dame-Marie-les-Bois, a village between Tours and Blois where he owned the seigneury and château of La Guérinière.
