= René Hérault =

French police chief (1691-1740)

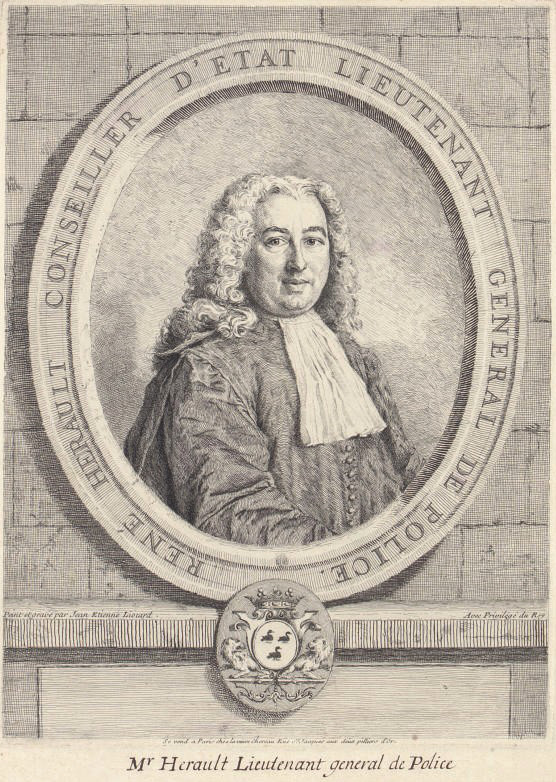
René Hérault, engraved portrait by Jean-Étienne Liotard

René Hérault, Seigneur de Fontaine-l'Abbé et de Vaucresson (23 April 1691 – 2 August 1740), simply known as René Hérault, and sometimes as René Hérault de Vaucresson, was a French magistrate and administrator who served as Lieutenant General of Police of Paris from 1725 to 1739.

== Origins and early career ==
Hérault was born in Rouen, Province of Normandy. He was the son of a tax collector, Louis Hérault (1645-1724), and his wife Jeanne Charlotte Guillard de la Vacherie.

René Hérault started his career in 1712, at the age of 21, as King's Advocate (a position similar to Advocate General) at the Châtelet of Paris, the city's civil and criminal court. On 3 February 1718 he became Chief Prosecutor (procureur général) at the Grand Conseil, a higher court of justice. He also became maître des requêtes, and on 23 March 1722 he was appointed intendant of the généralité of Tours. He showed his administrative ability during a famine in his généralité, and so on 28 August 1725 he was appointed Lieutenant General of Police of Paris, i.e. head of the Paris Police, succeeding Nicolas Ravot d'Ombreval, who succeeded him as intendant of the généralité of Tours.

== Lieutenant General of Police of Paris ==
As Lieutenant General of Police, René Hérault ordered that the sewage works and refuse dumps be relocated from the city of Paris into suburbs further afield. He also initiated the practice of sprinkling streets with water during summer heat waves to prevent fires.

In 1728, he ordered for the first time in History that street name signs be posted at the corner of streets. This was generalized by his decree of 30 July 1729, which demanded that all owners with houses at the beginning and end of the streets put stone tablets engraved with the street names on the exterior walls of their houses. The stone tablets were sealed within the facades. He also tried to introduce a numbering system for houses and buildings, but this failed due to opposition from the aristocracy whose members refused to have the front gate of their imposing mansions "disfigured" by number plaques.

During his time in office, he was quite tough on the Jansenists, for which he was attacked virulently by the Nouvelles ecclésiastiques, an underground newspaper which he could never close down. He notably put an end to the troubles caused by the convulsionaries of the Saint-Médard graveyard (a group of Jansenists claiming that miracles took place in this graveyard) in 1732.

He also fought against Freemasonry which had been newly introduced to France from England. He issued an order, that tavern-keepers and restaurant-keepers were not to give accommodation to Masonic lodges at all, under penalty of being closed down for six months and assessed a fine of 3,000 livres (approx. US$15,000 in 2006). In order to discredit Freemasonry, he obtained a copy of the secret Masonic ritual from a luxury prostitute, one of whose clients was an important Freemason, and he had it published in 1737 in salacious French newspapers. Laughter from the public upon hearing of the ridiculous secret rituals was a great embarrassment for French Freemasons and significantly hindered the penetration of Freemasonry in France for several years. René Hérault also established a large network of spies and informants in Paris and in the French provinces, and like many other Lieutenant Generals of Police of Paris in the 18th century, he was particularly disliked for his secret police.

== Death ==
On 30 December 1739, René Hérault left the Lieutenancy General of Police, where he was replaced by his son-in-law Claude-Henri Feydeau de Marville, and he was appointed intendant of the généralité of Paris and conseiller d'État. He died in office on 2 August 1740 in Paris, at the age of 49.

== Family ==
In 1719 René Hérault married Marguerite Durey de Vieuxcourt (1700-1729). In 1732 he married again to Hélène Moreau de Séchelles (1715-1798), the daughter of Jean Moreau de Séchelles (1690-1760), then intendant of the généralité of Valenciennes, who later became Controller-General of Finances (France's Finance Minister) and gave his name to the Seychelles archipelago.

René Hérault was the grandfather of French Revolution politician Marie-Jean Hérault de Séchelles, son of Colonel Jean-Baptiste Martin Hérault de Séchelles (1737-1759), himself son of René Hérault and his second wife Hélène Moreau de Séchelles. Most authors, however, consider that René Hérault was not the actual biological grandfather of Marie-Jean Hérault de Séchelles. The real biological grandfather was Louis Georges Érasme de Contades (1704-1793), Marshal of France, who had an affair with Hélène Moreau de Séchelles during her marriage to René Hérault, and who later took care of Marie-Jean Hérault de Séchelles after the early death of his father at the Battle of Minden in 1759 where Contades was commanding the French army.

René Hérault was also the grandfather of the famous Duchess of Polignac, friend and confidante of Queen Marie Antoinette. The Duchess of Polignac was the daughter of Jeanne Charlotte Hérault (1726-1753 or 1756), herself the daughter of René Hérault and his first wife.

Finally, the other daughter of René Hérault and his first wife, Louise Adélaïde Hérault (1722-1754), was married by her father in 1738 to Claude-Henri Feydeau de Marville, who succeeded René Hérault as Lieutenant General of Police of Paris in 1739.

== Bibliography ==
- Roger Dachez, Le lieutenant de police René Hérault et sa famille, in Renaissance Traditionnelle (Revue d’études maçonniques et symboliques), № 72, October 1987, pp. 264–268.
- Suzanne Pillorget, René Hérault de Fontaine, procureur général au Grand Conseil (1718-1722) et lieutenant général de police de Paris (1725-1739). Histoire d'une fortune., in Actes du 93è congrès national des Sociétés savantes (Tours, 1968), II, Paris 1971, pp. 287–311.
