= Marie-Jean Hérault de Séchelles =

French judge and politician (1759–1794)

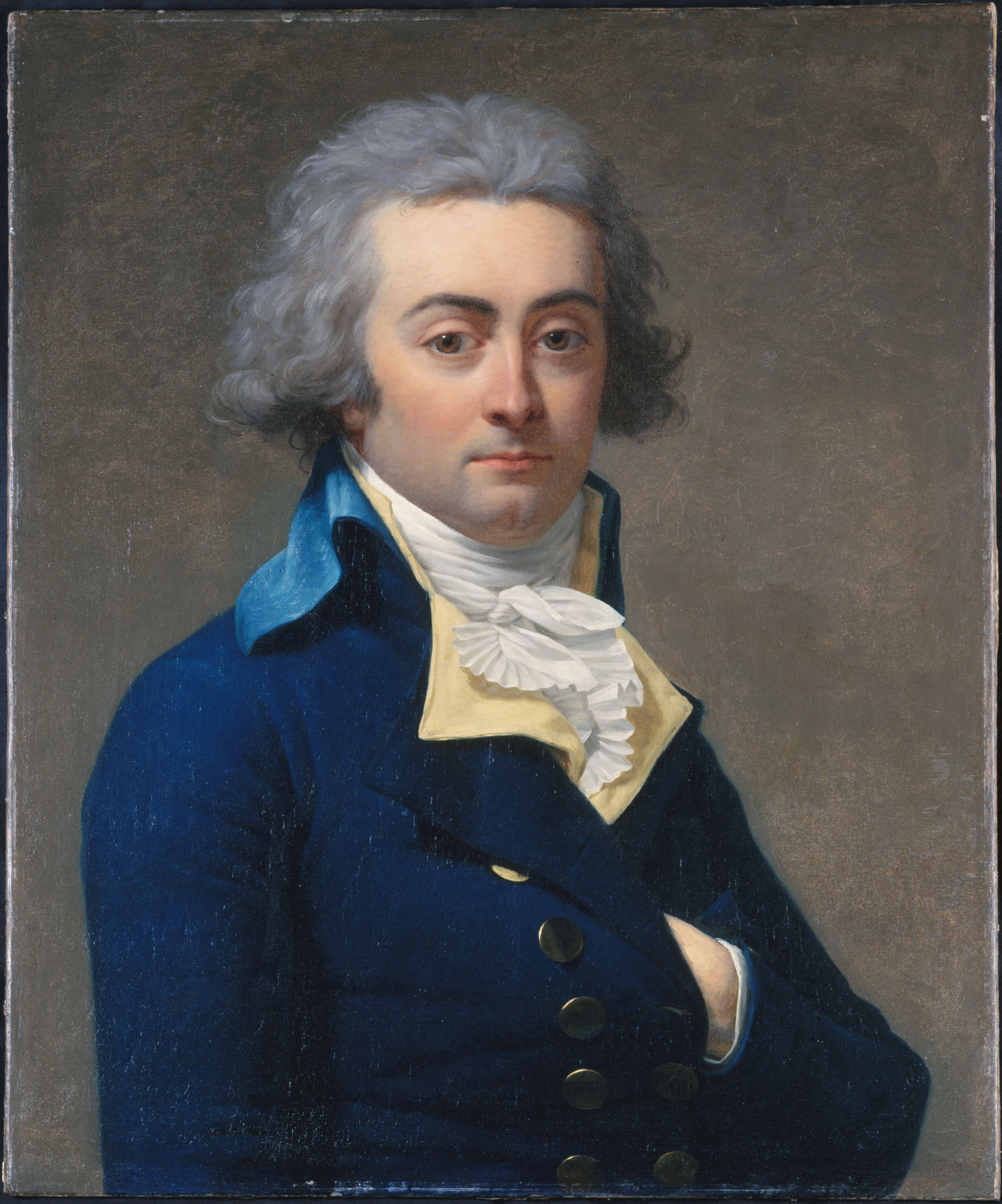
- Portrait by Jean-Louis Laneuville

4th & 24th President of the National Convention
- In office 8–22 August 1793
- Preceded by: Georges Danton
- Succeeded by: Maximilien Robespierre
- In office 1–15 November 1792
- Preceded by: Élie Guadet
- Succeeded by: Henri Grégoire

Personal details
- Born: 20 September 1759 Paris, Kingdom of France
- Died: 5 April 1794 (aged 34) Paris, French First Republic
- Cause of death: Execution by Guillotine
- Party: The Mountain

Marie-Jean Hérault de Séchelles (French pronunciation: [maʁi ʒɑ̃ eʁo də seʃɛl], 20 September 1759 – 5 April 1794) was a French judge, freemason and politician who took part in the French Revolution.

== Early life ==
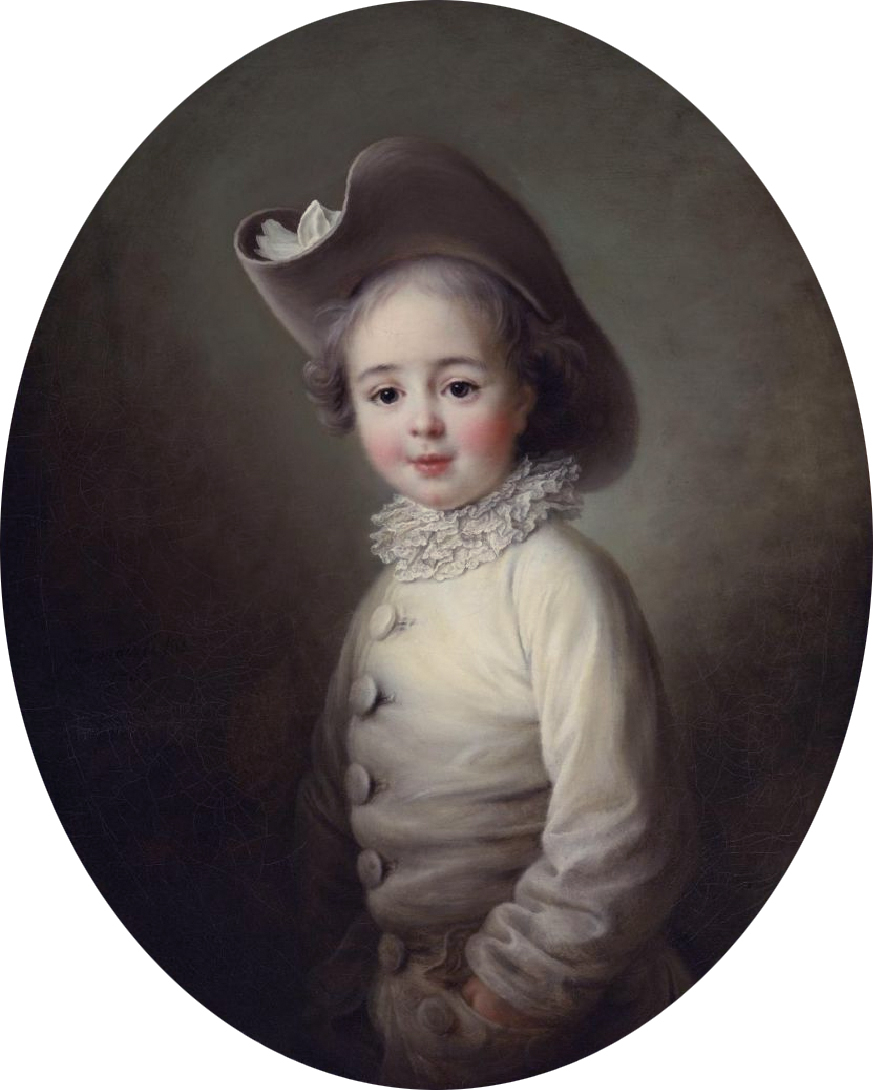
Marie-Jean Hérault de Séchelles at age 4 (François-Hubert Drouais)

Marie-Jean Hérault de Séchelles was born in Paris into a noble and well-known family. His grandfather was René Hérault, who had served as Lieutenant General of Police of Paris between 1725 and 1739. His great-grandfather was Jean Moreau de Séchelles (1690–1760), who had served as Controller-General of Finances between 1754 and 1756 and had given his name to the Seychelles archipelago. Jean Moreau de Séchelles's daughter, Hélène Moreau de Séchelles (1715–1798), was the second wife of René Hérault.

Most authors, however, consider that René Hérault was not the biological grandfather of Marie-Jean Hérault de Séchelles. His biological grandfather was most likely Louis Georges Érasme de Contades (1704–1795), Marshal of France, who had an affair with Hélène Moreau de Séchelles during her marriage to René Hérault. Hélène Moreau de Séchelles gave birth to a son in 1737, Jean-Baptiste Martin Hérault de Séchelles – the father of Marie-Jean, who died in 1759, at the Battle of Minden, where Contades was commanding the French army. Contades took care of Marie-Jean Hérault de Séchelles after the early death of his father. He had arranged to marry his illegitimate son Jean-Baptiste Martin Hérault de Séchelles to his wife's niece, so that he might present himself in society as the "uncle" of Marie-Jean.

Marie-Jean Hérault de Séchelles was also the first cousin of the famous Duchess of Polignac, the friend and confidant of Queen Marie Antoinette. The Duchess of Polignac, who would later be the object of deep revolutionary disapprobation, was the daughter of Jeanne Charlotte Hérault (1726–1753 or 1756), herself the daughter of René Hérault and his first wife. Finally, he was also the nephew of Claude-Henri Feydeau de Marville, Lieutenant General of Police of Paris between 1739 and 1747, who had married Marie-Jean's aunt – the second daughter of René Hérault and his first wife.

Hérault de Séchelles made his debut as a lawyer at the Châtelet of Paris, the city's civil and criminal court. At the age of twenty, he became King's Advocate (a position similar to Advocate General) at the Châtelet, in part due to the aid of the Duchess of Polignac. Associates of the Polignac family presented him to the queen, who pushed his appointment as Advocate General at the prestigious Parlement of Paris.

Active freemason, he was a member of Les Neuf Soeurs lodge since its creation in 1776.

His legal occupation did not prevent him from devoting himself to literature, and in 1785 he published an account of a visit he had made to the noted naturalist Georges-Louis Leclerc, the Comte de Buffon at Montbard: La visite à Buffon, ou Voyage à Montbard. He was also the author of a philosophical work published after his death, Théorie de l'ambition.

Despite his upbringing, Hérault became an early proponent of Revolutionary ideas, and took part in the storming of the Bastille in July 1789. In December 1790 he was appointed judge of the court of the 1st arrondissement in the département of Paris. From the end of January to April 1791, Hérault was absent on a mission in Alsace, where he had been sent to restore order following a period of civil unrest and to enforce the Civil Constitution of the Clergy. Here he received death-threats. On his return he was appointed Commissaire du Roi in the Cour de cassation.

== Legislative Assembly and initial missions ==
He was elected as a deputy for Paris to the Legislative Assembly, and in September 1792 was elected a deputy to the convention, where he gravitated towards the extreme left. He also served as a member of several committees; during his time as a member of the diplomatic committee, on 11 June 1793, he presented a memorable report demanding that the nation should be declared to be in danger.

During and after the 10 August 1792 insurrection, he worked alongside Georges Danton, one of the organizers and leading figures of this rising and, on 2 September, was appointed president of the Legislative Assembly.

In 1792, he was elected to the National Convention as deputy for the département of Seine-et-Oise, and was sent on a mission to organize the new département of Mont Blanc. He was thus absent during the trial of King Louis XVI, but he made it known that he approved of his execution.

== 1793–1794 ==
On his return to Paris, Hérault was several times president of the convention, notably on 2 June 1793, the occasion of the attack on the Girondins (when he unsuccessfully pleaded for the troops to retreat), and on 10 August 1793, on which was celebrated the passing of the Acte constitutionnel (called "of The Mountain"); Hérault de Sechelles served, alongside Louis de Saint-Just, as one of the writers and redactors of the 1793 Constitution, which was fated never to be put into effect.

Hérault was a member of the Reign of Terror's Committee of Public Safety, to which he was elected on 13 June 1793. He was chiefly concerned with diplomacy, and from October to December 1793 was employed on a diplomatic and military mission in Alsace. This mission made him an object of suspicion to the other members of the committee. Hérault, whose aristocratic background was also accounted a source of suspicion, was accused of collusion with foreign agents, amounting to treason by Bourdon de l'Oise on 16 December 1793. He responded by offering his resignation from the Committee of Public Safety, but this was refused. However the following Spring brought further accusations against him of collusion with counter-revolutionaries, and he was also embroiled in the scandal around the dissolution of the East India Company. He was tried before the Revolutionary Tribunal and condemned alongside Danton, François Joseph Westermann, Camille Desmoulins, and Pierre Philippeaux. They were guillotined on the same day: 5 April 1794 (16th Germinal in the year II).

== Fictionalized accounts ==
- Hérault appears in an important supporting role in A Far Better Rest, a reimagining of A Tale of Two Cities, by Susanne Alleyn.
- Hérault also appears as a supporting character in A Place of Greater Safety, a historical novel by Hilary Mantel which chronicles the French Revolution.

== Bibliography ==
- 1792 – Pétition à l'Assemblée Nationale, du 24 août 1792, l'an 4e de la liberté
- 1793 – Constitution républicaine, décrété par la Convention nationale de France, en 1793 et présentée à l'acceptation du peuple français
- 1890 – Voyage à Montbard
- 1907 – Oeuvres littéraires
